= List of chapters in Shiji =

The Shiji (Records of the Grand Historian), written by the Han dynasty historian Sima Qian, is about 526,000 Chinese characters long, making it four times longer than Thucydides' History of the Peloponnesian War, and longer than the Hebrew Bible. Sima Qian organized the chapters of the Shiji into five categories, each comprising a section of the book: Annals, Tables, Treatises, Hereditary Houses, and Ranked Biographies.

== Annals ==
Benji (本紀, annals), 12 volumes. Royal biographies in strict annalistic form that offer an overview of the most important events, especially from the time of the Zhou dynasty to that of the emperor of the Han dynasty.

Number	Title	Translation	Notes
1	五帝本紀	Annals of the Five Emperors	Traditional view of prehistoric China, beginning from the Yellow Emperor
2	夏本紀	Annals of Xia	Xia dynasty
3	殷本紀	Annals of Yin	Shang (Yin) dynasty
4	周本紀	Annals of Zhou	Zhou dynasty
5	秦本紀	Annals of Qin	State of Qin
6	秦始皇本紀	Annals of Qin Shi Huang	Qin dynasty
7	項羽本紀	Annals of Xiang Yu	
8	高祖本紀	Annals of Gaozu	Emperor Gaozu of Han, 206-195 BC
9	呂太后本紀	Annals of Empress Dowager Lü	Empress Lü Zhi (regent 195-180 BC)
10	孝文本紀	Annals of the Xiaowen Emperor	Emperor Wen of Han, 179-157 BC
11	孝景本紀	Annals of the Xiaojing Emperor	Emperor Jing of Han, 156-141 BC
12	孝武本紀	Annals of the Xiaowu Emperor	Emperor Wu of Han, 140-87 BC. Originally named Annals of His Majesty (今上本紀).

== Tables ==
Biao (表, tables), 10 tables: overview of the reigns of the successive lords of the feudal states from the time of the Zhou dynasty till that of the early Han. At the same time the most important events of their reigns are mentioned.

Number	Title	Translation	Notes
13	三代世表	Genealogical Table of the Three Ages	From the Yellow Emperor's time to the Xia, Shang, and Zhou dynasties
14	十二諸侯年表	Yearly Chronicle of the Feudal Lords	The lords who ruled the twelve feudal states in the Spring and Autumn period
15	六國年表	Yearly Chronicle of the Six States	The six feudal states in the Warring States period
16	秦楚之際月表	Monthly Table of (the Events) between Qin and Chu	The war between the feudal states of Qin and Chu
17	漢興以來諸侯王年表	Yearly Table of the Nobles of the Imperial Clan since the Han Dynasty's Founding	Nobles of the imperial family who held titles of nobility
18	高祖功臣侯者年表	Yearly Table of the Officials who became Marquises in the Time of Gaozu	Officials who received marquis titles in the time of Emperor Gaozu of Han
19	惠景閒侯者年表	Yearly Table of the Officials who became Marquises between the Reigns of Emperor Hui and Emperor Jing	Officials who received marquis titles from 194 to 141 BC
20	建元以來侯者年表	Yearly Table of the Officials who became Marquises since the Jianyuan Period	Jianyuan was the reign period of Emperor Wu of Han from 140 to 135 BC
21	建元已來王子侯者年表	Yearly Table of the Nobles' Sons who became Marquises since the Jianyuan period	
22	漢興以來將相名臣年表	Yearly Table of Statesmen, Generals and Officials since the Han Dynasty's Founding	

== Treatises ==
Shu (書, treatises), 8 volumes. Each treatise describes an area of state interest.

Number	Title	Translation	Notes
23	禮書	Rites	
24	樂書	Music	probably postdating Sima Qian, cf. Record of Music
25	律書	Bells	Harmony and measurements
26	曆書	Calendars	
27	天官書	Astronomy	
28	封禪書	Religious sacrificial ceremonies	Sacrifices to Heaven and Earth
29	河渠書	Rivers and canals	
30	平準書	Equalization	Names of officials who had to buy crops in a year of bountiful harvest and sell in a year of crop failure

== Genealogies ==
Shijia (世家, genealogies), 30 volumes. Descriptions in chronicle form of the events of the states from the time of the Zhou dynasty until the early Han dynasty and of eminent people.

Number	Title	Translation	Notes
31	吳太伯世家	House of Wu Taibo	State of Wu
32	齊太公世家	House of Duke Tai of Qi	State of Qi under the House of Jiang
33	魯周公世家	House of Lu Zhougong	State of Lu
34	燕召公世家	House of Yan Shaogong	State of Yan
35	管蔡世家	Houses of Guan and Cai	States of Cai and Cao
36	陳杞世家	Houses of Chen and Qi	
37	衛康叔世家	House of Wei Kang Shu	State of Wey
38	宋微子世家	House of Song Wei Zi	State of Song
39	晉世家	House of Jin	
40	楚世家	House of Chu	
41	越王句踐世家	House of King Goujian of Yue	State of Yue
42	鄭世家	House of Zheng	
43	趙世家	House of Zhao	
44	魏世家	House of Wei	
45	韓世家	House of Han	
46	田敬仲完世家	House of Tian Jingzhong (Tian Wan)	State of Qi under the House of Tian
47	孔子世家	House of Confucius	
48	陳涉世家	House of Chen She	
49	外戚世家	Houses of the External Relatives	The empresses and their families
50	楚元王世家	House of Prince Yuan of Chu	
51	荊燕世家	Houses of Jing and Yan	
52	齊悼惠王世家	House of Prince Daohui of Qi	Liu Fei
53	蕭相國世家	House of Chancellor Xiao	Xiao He
54	曹相國世家	House of Chancellor Cao	Cao Shen
55	留侯世家	House of Marquis of Liu	Zhang Liang
56	陳丞相世家	House of Chancellor Chen	Chen Ping
57	絳侯周勃世家	House of Zhou Bo, Marquis of Jiang	
58	梁孝王世家	House of Prince Xiao of Liang	
59	五宗世家	House of the Five Clans	The sons of Emperor Jing of Han
60	三王世家	House of the Three Kings	The rulers of Qi, Yan and Guangling

== Biographies ==
Liezhuan (列傳, exemplary lives, often called biographies), 70 volumes. Biographies of important people. The biographies are limited to the description of the events that show the exemplary character of the subject, but in the Shiji is often supplemented with legends. One biography can treat two or more people if they are considered to belong to the same type. The last biographies describe the relations between the Chinese and the neighboring peoples.

Number	Title	Translation	Notes
61	伯夷列傳	Biography of Boyi	The brothers Boyi (伯夷) and Shu Qi (叔齊)
62	管晏列傳	Biographies of Guan and Yan	Guan Zhong and Yan Ying (晏嬰)
63	老子韓非列傳	Biographies of Laozi and Han Fei	Includes the biographies of Zhuangzi and Shen Buhai
64	司馬穰苴列傳	Biography of Sima Rangju	
65	孫子吳起列傳	Biographies of Sun Tzu and Wu Qi	
66	伍子胥列傳	Biography of Wu Zixu	
67	仲尼弟子列傳	Biographies of the disciples of Zhongni	Zhongni 仲尼 was the courtesy name of Confucius. Biographies of Yan Yuan (Yan Hui) 顏淵, Min Ziqian 閔子騫, Ran Boniu 冄伯牛, Zhong Gong 仲弓, Ran You 冄有, Ji Lu 季路, Zai Wo (Ziwo) 宰我, Zi Gong 子貢, Ziyou 子有, Zixia 子夏, Zizhang 子張, Zeng Shen 曾參, Gao Chai 高柴, Zirong 子容, Ziyu 子羽, Ziyou 子游, and several more. At the end are 42 disciples' names with no other information.
68	商君列傳	Biography of Lord Shang	Shang Yang
69	蘇秦列傳	Biography of Su Qin	
70	張儀列傳	Biography of Zhang Yi	
71	樗里子甘茂列傳	Biographies of Shu Lizi and Gan Mao	Includes the biography of Gan Luo (甘羅)
72	穰侯列傳	Biography of the Marquis of Rang	Wei Ran (魏冉)
73	白起王翦列傳	Biographies of Bai Qi and Wang Jian	
74	孟子荀卿列傳	Biographies of Mengzi and Xun Qing	Mencius and Xunzi
75	孟嘗君列傳	Biography of Lord Mengchang	one of the Four Lords of the Warring States
76	平原君虞卿列傳	Biographies of Lord Pingyuan and Yu Qing	Lord Pingyuan was one of the Four Lords of the Warring States
77	魏公子列傳	Biography of the prince of Wei	Lord Xinling, one of the Four Lords of the Warring States
78	春申君列傳	Biography of Lord Chunshen	one of the Four Lords of the Warring States
79	范睢蔡澤列傳	Biographies of Fan Sui and Cai Ze	
80	樂毅列傳	Biography of Yue Yi	
81	廉頗藺相如列傳	Biographies of Lian Po and Lin Xiangru	Biographies of Lian Po and Lin Xiangru is a Song dynasty calligraphic work by Huang Tingjian.
82	田單列傳	Biography of Tian Dan	
83	魯仲連鄒陽列傳	Biographies of Lu Zhonglian and Zou Yang	
84	屈原賈生列傳	Biographies of Qu Yuan and Master Jia	Master Jia refers to Jia Yi
85	呂不韋生列傳	Biography of Master Lü Buwei	
86	刺客列傳	Biographies of Assassins	Cao Mo (曹沫), Zhuan Zhu, Yu Rang (豫讓), Nie Zheng (聶政) and Jing Ke
87	李斯列傳	Biography of Li Si	
88	蒙恬列傳	Biography of Meng Tian	
89	張耳陳餘列傳	Biographies of Zhang Er and Chen Yu	
90	魏豹彭越列傳	Biographies of Wei Bao and Peng Yue	
91	黥布列傳	Biography of Qing Bu	Ying Bu
92	淮陰侯列傳	Biography of the Marquis of Huaiyin	Han Xin [general]
93	韓信盧綰列傳	Biographies of Han Xin [King of Han] and Lu Wan	Includes the biography of Chen Xi
94	田儋列傳	Biography of Tian Dan	
95	樊酈滕灌列傳	Biographies of Fan, Li, Teng and Guan	Fan Kuai, Li Shang, Xiahou Ying, Guan Ying (灌嬰)
96	張丞相列傳	Biography of Chancellor Zhang	Zhang Cang (張蒼)
97	酈生陸賈列傳	Biographies of Li Yiji and Lu Gu	Includes the biography of Zhu Jian (朱建)
98	傅靳蒯成列傳	Biographies of Fu, Jin, and the Marquis of Kuaicheng	Fu Kuan (傅寬), Jin Xi (靳歙) and Zhou Xue (周譄)
99	劉敬叔孫通列傳	Biographies of Liu Jing and Shusun Tong	
100	季布欒布列傳	Biographies of Ji Bu and Luan Bu	
101	袁盎晁錯列傳	Biographies of Yuan Ang and Chao Cuo	
102	張釋之馮唐列傳	Biographies of Zhang Shizhi and Feng Tang	
103	萬石張叔列傳	Biographies of Wan Shi and Zhang Shu	
104	田叔列傳	Biography of Tian Shu	
105	扁鵲倉公列傳	Biographies of Bian Que and the Duke of Cang	Duke of Cang refers to Tai Cang (太倉)
106	吳王濞列傳	Biography of Pi, Prince of Wu	Liu Pi
107	魏其武安侯列	Biographies of the Marquis of Weiqi and the Marquis of Wu'an	Dou Ying (竇嬰) and Tian Fen (田蚡)
108	韓長孺列傳	Biography of Han Changru	
109	李將軍列傳	Biography of General Li	Li Guang
110	匈奴列傳	Treatise on the Xiongnu	
111	衛將軍驃騎列傳	Biographies of General Wei and General Piaoji	Wei Qing and Huo Qubing
112	平津侯主父列傳	Biographies of the Marquis of Pingjin and Zhufu	Gongsun Hong (公孫弘) and Zhufu Yan (主父偃)
113	南越列傳	Treatise on the Nanyue	
114	東越列傳	Treatise on the Eastern Yue	
115	朝鮮列傳	Treatise on Joseon	Korea
116	西南夷列傳	Treatise on the Southwestern Yi people	
117	司馬相如列傳	Biography of Sima Xiangru	
118	淮南衡山列傳	Biographies of Huainan and Hengshan	The kings of Huainan and Hengshan
119	循吏列傳	Biographies of Upright Officials	Sunshu Ao, Zichan, Gong Yixiu (公儀休), Shi She (石奢) and Li Li (李離)
120	汲鄭列傳	Biographies of Ji and Zheng	Ji An (汲黯) and Zheng Dangshi (鄭當時)
121	儒林列傳	Biographies of Confucian Scholars	Gongsun Hong (公孫弘), Shen Gong (申公), Yuan Gu (轅固), Han Ying (韓嬰), Fu Sheng, Dong Zhongshu and Hu Wu (胡毋)
122	酷吏列傳	Biographies of Cruel Officials	Hou Feng (侯封), Zhi Du (郅都), Ning Cheng, Zhou Yangyou (周陽由), Zhao Yu (趙禹), Zhang Tang, Yi Zong (義縱), Wang Wenshu (王溫舒), Yin Qi (尹齊), Yang Pu (楊僕), Jian Xuan (減宣), and Du Zhou (杜周)
123	大宛列傳	Treatise on the Dayuan	(Ferghana)
124	游俠列傳	Biographies of Knight-errants	Lu Zhujia (魯朱家) and Guo Jie (郭解)
125	佞幸列傳	Biographies of Male Favorites	Male favorites of the Han emperors, among others Ji (籍), Hong (閎), Deng Tong (鄧通), Zhao Tong (趙同), Beigong Bozi (北宮伯子), Zhou Wenren (周文仁), Han Yan (韓嫣), and Li Yannian (李延年)
126	滑稽列傳	Biographies of Jesters	Chunyu Kun, You Meng (優孟), You Zhan (優旃) and Dongfang Shuo
127	日者列傳	Biographies of Soothsayers	Sima Jizhu (司馬季主), a soothsayer, in conversation with Song Zhong (宋忠) and Jia Yi (賈誼) in Chang'an
128	龜策列傳	Biographies of Diviners	Includes a text by Chu Shaosun (褚少孫) on sacred turtles used in divining, astrology, the magician Wan Bi (萬畢), the scholar Wei Ping (衛平), Duke Yuan of Song (宋元公)
129	貨殖列傳	Biographies of Usurers	Short biographies of people who enriched themselves (merchants): Fan Li (范蠡) (commerce), Ji Ran (計然) (economist), Duanmu Ci (端木賜) (commerce), Bai Gui (白圭) (agriculture, silk), Yi Dun (猗頓) (salt), Guo Zong (郭縱) (iron), Luo of Wuzhi (烏氏倮) (livestock at the frontier), Cheng Zheng (程鄭) (metal trade), Dao Xian (刀閒) (slaves), Shi Shi (師史) (peddler), Qiao Yao (橋姚) (livestock at the frontier), Wu Yan (無鹽) (money-lender), Qin Yang (秦揚) (agriculture), Tian Shu (田叔) (tomb-robbing), Huan Fa (桓發) (gambling), Yong Lecheng (雍樂成) (peddler), Yong Bo (雍伯) (selling animal fat), Zhang Li (張里) (horse veterinarian), and of the origins of the wealth of many other rich families; also includes description of the geography of Handan, Luoyang and several regions; and a description of the economy under the Han dynasty.

== Afterword ==
The last important section features an afterword that includes an autobiography by Sima Qian. He explains in it why and under what circumstances he wrote the Shiji.

Number	Title	Translation	Notes
130	太史公自序	Autobiographical Afterword of the Grand Historian	
