= List of Confucianists =

This is a partial list of people who follow Confucianism, selected for their influence on that belief, or for their fame in other areas.

== Early Confucians ==
- Confucius – founder
  - Disciples of Confucius
    - Ten Wise Ones
      - Yan Hui
      - Min Sun
      - Ran Geng
      - Ran Yong
      - Duanmu Ci
      - Zai Yu
      - Ran Qiu
      - Zhong You
      - Yan Yan
      - Bu Shang
- Zisi
- Mencius
- Xun Zi

== Neo-Confucians ==
- Zhang Zai
- Zhou Dunyi

=== Cheng–Zhu school ===
- Cheng Hao and Cheng Yi
- Zhu Xi

=== Lu–Wang school ===
- Lu Jiuyuan
- Wang Yangming

=== Yongjia School ===
- Ye Shi

== Japanese Confucianism ==
Family name comes first in Japanese language.

- Fujiwara Seika
- Hayashi Razan
- Ogyū Sorai
- Toju Nakae

Modern

- Kaji Nobuyuki (b. 1936)
- Kure Tomofusa (b.1946) also known as Go, Chi'ei
- Tsuchida Kenjiro (b. 1949)
- Uno Sei'ichi (1910–2008)
- Yasuoka Masahiro (安岡正篤) (1898–1983)

== Korean Confucianism ==
- Yi Hwang
- Yi I

== Vietnamese Confucianism ==
- Chu Văn An
- Nguyễn Trãi
- Lê Văn Thịnh
- Bùi Quốc Khái
- Trần Thái Tông
- Trương Hán Siêu
- Chu Văn An
- Lê Quát
- Nguyễn Trãi
- Ngô Sĩ Liên
- Lê Thánh Tông
- Nguyễn Bỉnh Khiêm
- Lê Quý Đôn
- Nguyễn Khuyến
- Phan Đình Phùng
- Minh Mạng
- Tự Đức

== New Confucians ==
- Tu Wei-Ming – advocate of "New Confucianism"
- Xiong Shili – founding figure in "New Confucianism"
- Ma Yifu – founding figure in "New Confucianism"

== Western Confucians or scholars of Confucianism ==
- Philip J. Ivanhoe
- Robert Cummings Neville
- Eric L. Hutton

== Other ==
- Wang Fuzhi
- Huang Zongxi
- Gu Xiancheng

== See also ==
- Disciples of Confucius
- List of people by belief
- List of Confucian states and dynasties
