= Ran (surname) =

冉
- Pronunciation: Rǎn (Mandarin)
- Language: Chinese, Hebrew

Origin
- Language: Old Chinese

Other names
- Variant form: Jan3
- Derivative: Jan

Rǎn is the Mandarin pinyin romanization of the Chinese surname written 冉 in Chinese character. It is romanized Jan in Wade–Giles. Ran is listed 301st in the Song dynasty classic text Hundred Family Surnames. As of 2008, it is the 178th most common surname in China, shared by 670,000 people.

== Notable people ==
- Ran Geng or Boniu (544 BC – ?), disciple of Confucius, one of the Twelve Philosophers
- Nanyang Huizhong (675–775), born Ran Huyin, Tang dynasty Zen Buddhist monk
- Ran Jizai (冉季載), tenth son of King Wen of Zhou, enfeoffed at the state of Ran
- Ran Min (died 352), Emperor of Ran Wei, during the Sixteen Kingdoms period
- Ran Qiu or Ran You (522 BC – ?), disciple of Confucius, one of the Twelve Philosophers
- Ran Wanxiang (冉万祥; born 1963), Vice Governor of Gansu province
- Ran Yong or Zhonggong (522 BC – ?), disciple of Confucius, one of the Twelve Philosophers
- Ran Yunfei (born 1965), writer and activist
- Ran Zhan (冉瞻; died 328 AD), general of Later Zhao
- Ran Zhi (died 354), crown prince of Ran Wei

== See also ==
- Eyal Ran (born 1972), Israeli tennis player and Captain of the Israel Davis Cup team
