= Tantai Mieming =

Disciple of Confucius (born 512 BC)

Tantai Mieming or Dantai Mieming (Chinese: 澹臺滅明; Wade–Giles: Tan-t'ai Mieh-ming; born 512 BC), also known by his courtesy name Ziyu (Chinese: 子羽; Wade–Giles: Tzu-yü), was a major disciple of Confucius. He was known for being very ugly, but was morally upright. He started his own school in the Yangtze River region, and became a major transmitter of Confucian thoughts. Confucius initially misjudged him because of his bad looks, but later expressed his regret.

== Life ==
According to the Records of the Grand Historian, Tantai Mieming (Ziyu) was born in 512 BC, 39 years younger than Confucius, but the Kongzi Jiayu says he was 49 years younger. He was born in Wucheng (Wu City) in the State of Lu, Confucius' native state.

Tantai was known for being exceedingly ugly, and Confucius considered him untalented because of his bad looks, but he proved to be a morally upright person. After graduating from the school of Confucius, he moved south to the Yangtze River region and started his own school with 300 students. He became an important transmitter of Confucian thoughts, and was famous among the rulers of states.

When Confucius learned of Ziyu's success, he remorsefully said: "I used to judge a person by his speech and erred in Zai Yu; I used to judge a person by his appearance and erred in Ziyu."

== Honours and memorials ==
In Confucian temples, Tantai Mieming's spirit tablet is placed in the outer court, beyond those of the Four Assessors and Twelve Wise Ones.

During the Tang dynasty, Emperor Xuanzong posthumously awarded Tantai Mieming the nobility title of Count of Jiang (江伯). During the Song dynasty, he was further awarded the title of Marquis of Jinxiang (金鄉侯).

According to the Tang dynasty historian Sima Zhen in his Shiji Suoyin, the Tantai (Dantai) Lake (31°15′30.2″N 120°38′57″E) southeast of Suzhou is named after Tantai Mieming.

There is a Tantai Mieming tomb (澹台滅明墓) in Nanchang, Jiangxi province, on the campus of Nanchang No. 2 High School. It has a tombstone erected during the Song dynasty, and was refurbished during the Ming and Qing dynasties.

== Bibliography ==
- Han, Zhaoqi (2010). "Biographies of the Disciples of Confucius". Shiji (史记) (in Chinese). Beijing: Zhonghua Book Company. ISBN 978-7-101-07272-3.
- Huang, Chichung, ed. (1997). The Analects of Confucius. Oxford University Press. ISBN 978-0-19-506157-4.
- Legge, James (2009). The Confucian Analects, the Great Learning & the Doctrine of the Mean. Cosimo. ISBN 978-1-60520-644-8.
