= Youzi =

Youzi may refer to:

- Pomelo, a large citrus fruit native to Asia, known as Youzi (柚子) in Chinese
- You Ruo, a disciple of Confucius also known by the name Youzi (有子)
