= Zhuansun Shi =

5th-century BC disciple of Confucius

- Traditional Chinese: 顓孫師
- Simplified Chinese: 颛孙师
Transcriptions
Standard Mandarin
- Hanyu Pinyin: Zhuānsūn Shī
- Wade–Giles: Chuan-sun Shih

Other names

Zizhang (Courtesy name)
- Traditional Chinese: 子張
- Simplified Chinese: 子张
Transcriptions
Standard Mandarin
- Hanyu Pinyin: Zǐzhāng
- Wade–Giles: Tzu-chang

Zhuansun Shi (born 503 BC), commonly known by his courtesy name Zizhang, was a prominent disciple of Confucius, who accompanied Confucius in his travels abroad, and later started his own sect of Confucianism.

== Life ==
Zhuansun Shi (Zizhang) was born in 503 BC, 48 years after Confucius. According to the Shiben (Book of Lineages), his grandfather was a prince of the State of Chen, who served in the government of Lu, Confucius' native state. Although Sima Qian's Records of the Grand Historian identifies Zizhang as belonging to the State of Chen, he was likely born and raised in Lu.

Zizhang was well versed in ritual practices, but was said to be lacking in his pursuit of humanity. Duanmu Ci (Zigong), another prominent disciple of Confucius, said of Zizhang: "Not to boast of his admirable merit; not to signify joy on account of noble station; neither insolent nor indolent; showing no pride to the dependent: these are the characteristics of Zhuansun Shi."

Zhuansun Shi later started his own school, and his disciples formed a branch of Confucianism known as the "Zizhang Sect", which was mentioned by philosophers Xunzi and Han Feizi, centuries after Zizhang's lifetime.

The Analects contains three chapters of Zhuansun Shi's sayings. When he was gravely ill, he said to his son Shenxiang (申祥): "We speak of his end in the case of a superior man, and of his death in the case of a mean man. May I think that it is going to be the former with me today?"

== Legacy ==
In Confucian temples, Zhuansun Shi's spirit tablet is placed the fifth on the west, among the Twelve Wise Ones.

During the Tang dynasty, Emperor Xuanzong posthumously awarded Zhuansun Shi the nobility title of Count of Chen (陳伯). During the Song dynasty, he was further awarded the titles of Marquis of Wanqiu (宛丘侯), Marquis of Yingchuan (穎川侯), and Duke of Chen (陳公).

Zhuansun Shi's offspring held the title of Wujing Boshi (五經博士; Wǔjīng Bóshì).
