= Bing (measuring unit) =

Unit of volume used in ancient China

A Bing (秉) was a measuring unit used in ancient China for volume.

One bing was equal to 16 hu (斛), which themselves were equal to 10 dou (斗). A dou is near equivalent to 10 litres in modern units. Therefore, a bing would have been near equivalent to 1600 litres.

== Usage ==
The bing unit was used in ancient times to measure volumes of grain.

It is mentioned in book six of the Analects when Ran Qiu requests Confucius, while he is presumably serving in the government of the State of Lu to give a dole of grain to Zihua's mother. Confucius offers to give only a fu (釜) and a yu (庾), together equaling about 88 litres of grain. Ran Qiu, who seems to feel this is too little, then provides her with 5 bing (8000 litres). Confucius then gives an indirect criticism saying that Zihua was a wealthy man and that it was not virtuous to give charity to the wealthy: "I have heard that a superior man helps the distressed, but does not add to the wealth of the rich."
