= Fan Xu =

Fan Xu may refer to:

- Fan Xu, a disciple of Confucius
- Xu Fan, a Chinese actress
