= Nangong Kuo (disciple of Confucius) =

5th century BC disciple of Confucius

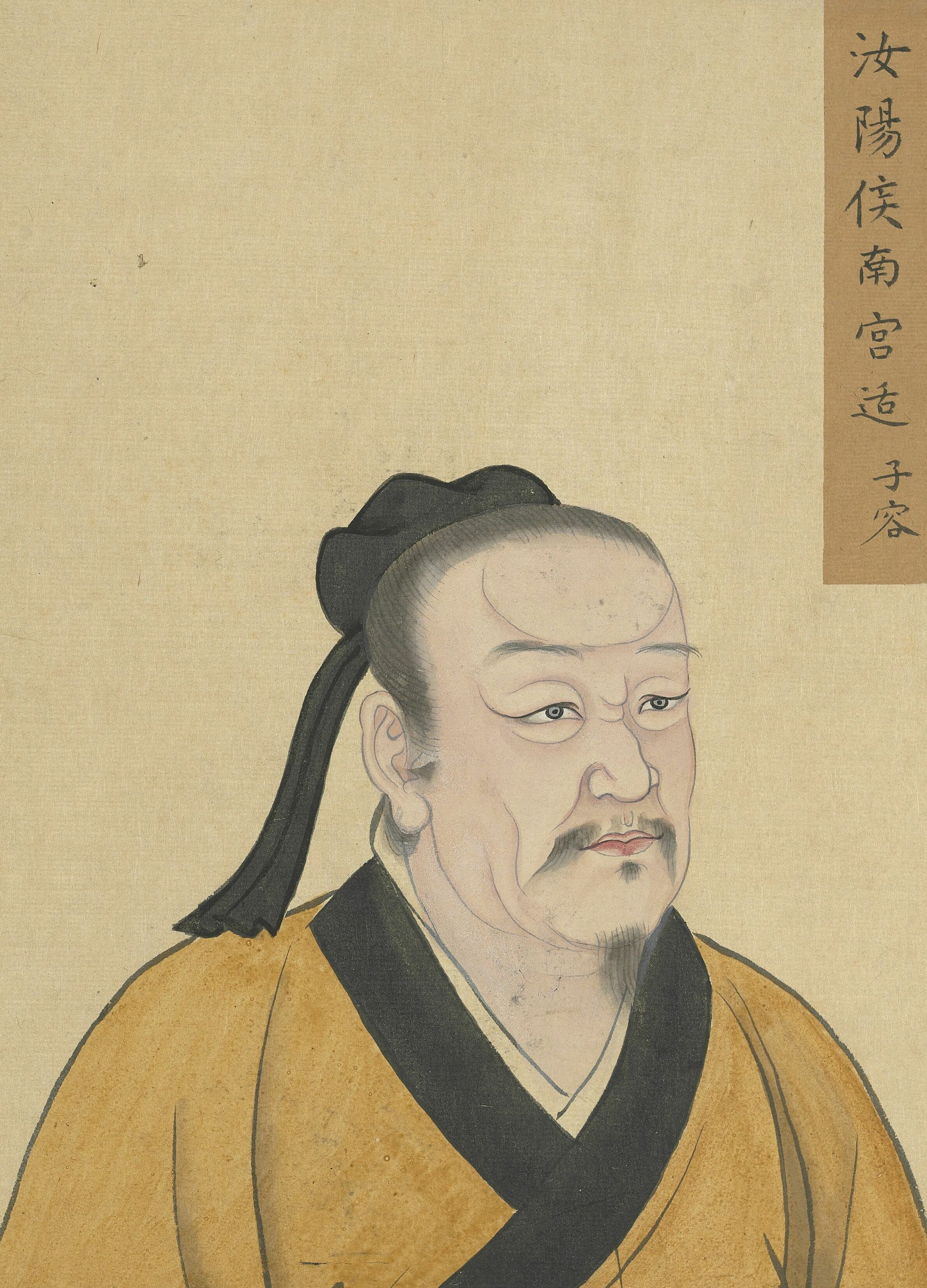
- Yuan dynasty portrait.
- Traditional Chinese: 南宮括
- Simplified Chinese: 南宫括
Transcriptions
Standard Mandarin
- Hanyu Pinyin: Nángōng Kuò
- Wade–Giles: Nan-kung K'uo

Courtesy Name
- Chinese: 子容
Transcriptions
Standard Mandarin
- Hanyu Pinyin: Zǐróng
- Wade–Giles: Tzu-jung
Middle Chinese
- Middle Chinese: Tsi Yowng
Old Chinese
- Baxter–Sagart (2014): Tsəʔ Goŋ

Nan Rong
- Chinese: 南容
Transcriptions
Standard Mandarin
- Hanyu Pinyin: Nán Róng
- Wade–Giles: Nan Jung
Middle Chinese
- Middle Chinese: Nom Yowng
Old Chinese
- Baxter–Sagart (2014): Nˁəm Goŋ

Nangong Tao
- Traditional Chinese: 南宮韜
- Simplified Chinese: 南宫韬
Transcriptions
Standard Mandarin
- Hanyu Pinyin: Nángōng Tāo
- Wade–Giles: Nan-kung T'ao

Posthumous Titles

Count of Tan
- Chinese: 郯伯
Transcriptions
Standard Mandarin
- Hanyu Pinyin: Tánbó
- Wade–Giles: T'an-po

Marquis of Gongqiu
- Traditional Chinese: 龔丘侯
- Simplified Chinese: 龚丘侯
Transcriptions
Standard Mandarin
- Hanyu Pinyin: Gōngqiū Hóu
- Wade–Giles: Kung-ch'iu Hou

Marquis of Ruyang
- Traditional Chinese: 汝陽侯
- Simplified Chinese: 汝阳侯
Transcriptions
Standard Mandarin
- Hanyu Pinyin: Rǔyáng Hóu
- Wade–Giles: Ju-yang Hou

Nangong Kuo (fl. 5th century BC), commonly known as Nan Rong and also known by his courtesy name Zirong and as Nangong Tao, was a major disciple of Confucius. Commending Nangong Kuo as a gentleman of virtue, Confucius gave the student his niece in marriage.

== Life ==
Nangong Kuo was a native of the state of Lu. His dates of birth and death are not known.

The Analects (14.5) records Nangong Kuo's observation that Hou Yi and Ao (奡), powerful military leaders, both ended up being killed; while Yu the Great and Hou Ji, men who took care of the land, ended up with "possession of the world." Confucius commended Nangong as a junzi, a gentleman of virtue. He gave his niece, the daughter of his elder brother Mengpi, to Nangong in marriage. (Note: Yang Bojun postulates that Mengpi was likely dead at the time, which explains why Confucius chose the husband for his niece.)

When Nangong Kuo was serving Duke Ai of Lu, a fire broke out at the palace. While others attempted to secure the contents of the treasury, Nangong focussed on saving the palace library. He was then credited with the preservation of the state's copy of the Rites of Zhou, among other ancient texts.

== Nangong Jingshu ==
Some scholars identify Nangong Kuo with Nangong Jingshu (南宮敬叔), the younger son of Meng Xizi, head of the powerful Mengsun clan of Lu, but this identification is disputed by others. Meng Xizi was an admirer of Confucius and, on his deathbed, he urged his two sons, Meng Yizi and Nangong Jingshu, to study with the Master, which they did. Nangong Jingshu was largely responsible for Confucius' journey to the court of the Zhou king to study the rites and songs there.

== Posthumous titles ==
During the Tang dynasty, Emperor Xuanzong posthumously awarded Nangong Kuo the title of Count of Tan. During the Song dynasty, he was further awarded the titles of Marquis of Gongqiu and Marquis of Ruyang.
