= Jinan Baihua Park =

Park in Jinan, China

Baihua Park
- 百花公园
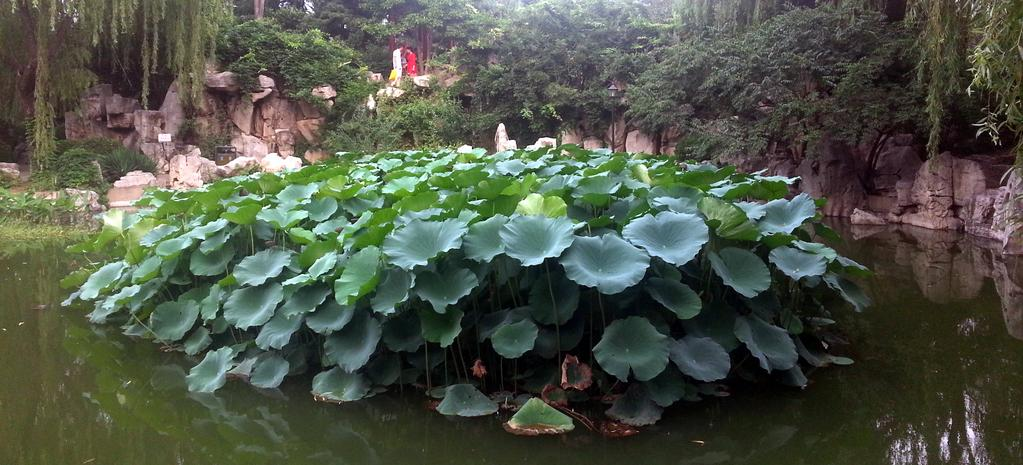
- Lotus growth in a pond in the Baihua Park
- Interactive map of Baihua Park
- Location: Jinan, Shandong, China
- Coordinates: 36°40′33.67″N 117°4′10″E
- Area: 180,000 m^{2} (1,900,000 sq ft)
- Operator: City of Jinan
- Open: all year, 5:00 - 22:00h

The Baihua Park (Chinese: 济南市百花公园; pinyin: Jǐnán Shì Bǎihuā Gōngyuán; lit. 'Hundred Flower Park') is a public park in the City of Jinan, Shandong Province, China. The park covers an area of approximately 180,000 square meters, of which about 82% are covered with plantings. The main divisions of the park are: hundred flower spring viewing area (百花泉景区), landscape garden (山水园), peony garden (牡丹园), peony mountain (牡丹山), and aloe garden (芦花区). After a renovation that started in March 2010, the park was reopened on October 1, 2010. The Baihua park is located immediately next to the Tomb of Min Ziqian and it was formerly known as "Catkins Park" in a reference to the story about Min Ziqian's exemplary filial piety.

== See also ==
- Tomb of Min Ziqian
- List of sites in Jinan
