= Tomb of Min Ziqian =

Coordinates: 36°40′33.67″N 117°3′38.05″E

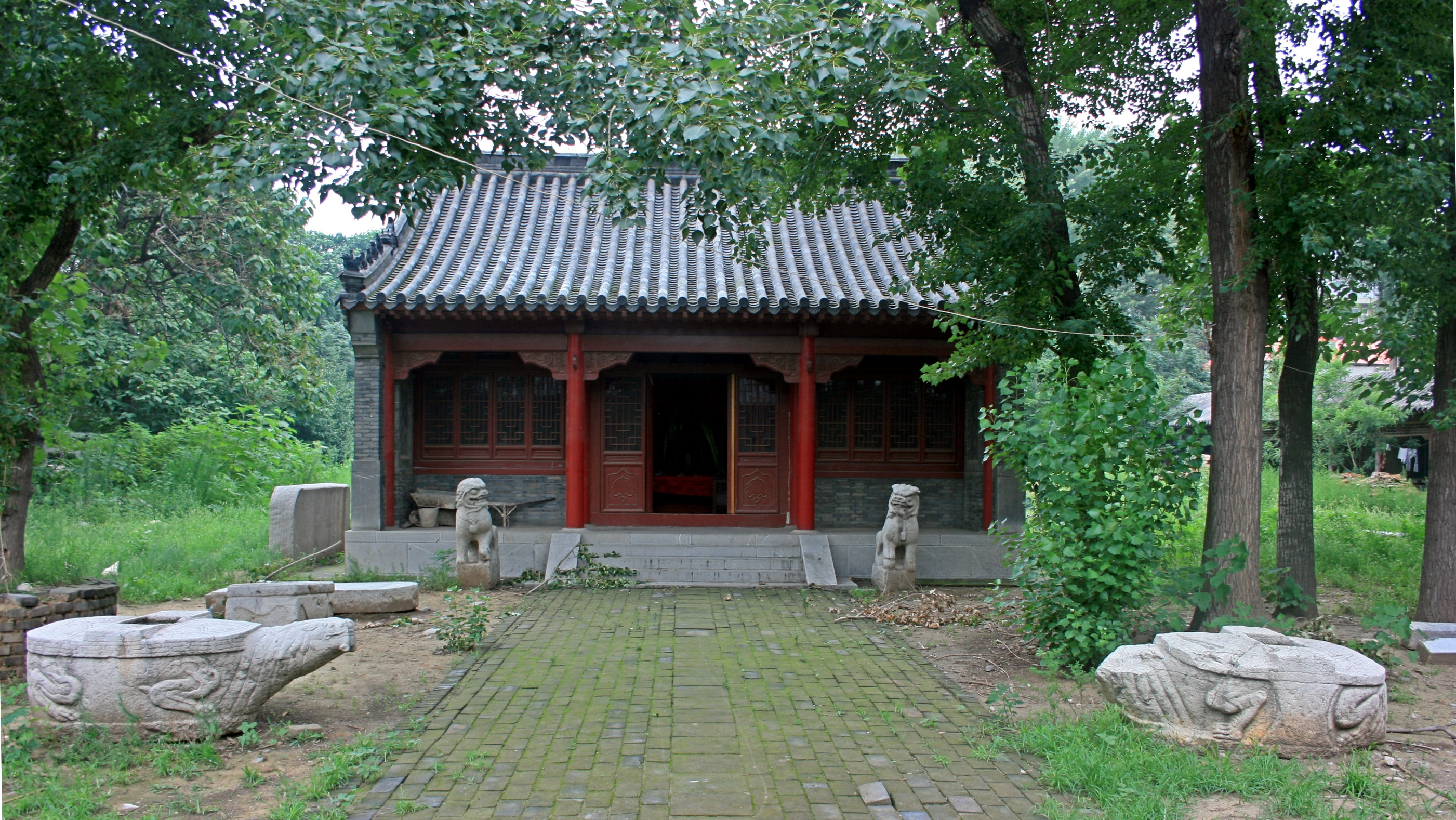
Hall on the site of the tomb, with two bixi turtles (deprived of their stelae)

The Tomb of Min Ziqian (Chinese: 闵子骞墓; pinyin: Mǐn Zǐqiān Mù) is a memorial to Min Sun (courtesy name Ziqian, 536 BCE-?), a disciple of Confucius and the fourth of the 24 Confucian paragons of filial piety. The memorial is located in Jinan, the capital of Shandong Province, China.

While the memorial is designed as a classical Confucian tomb with an ancestral temple, a spirit way, and a burial mound, the actual burial place of Min Sun is not known. Only some of Min Sun's clothes may have been buried at the Jinan site. Other places in Jiangsu, Henan, and Anhui also have tombs erected to commemorate Min Sun.

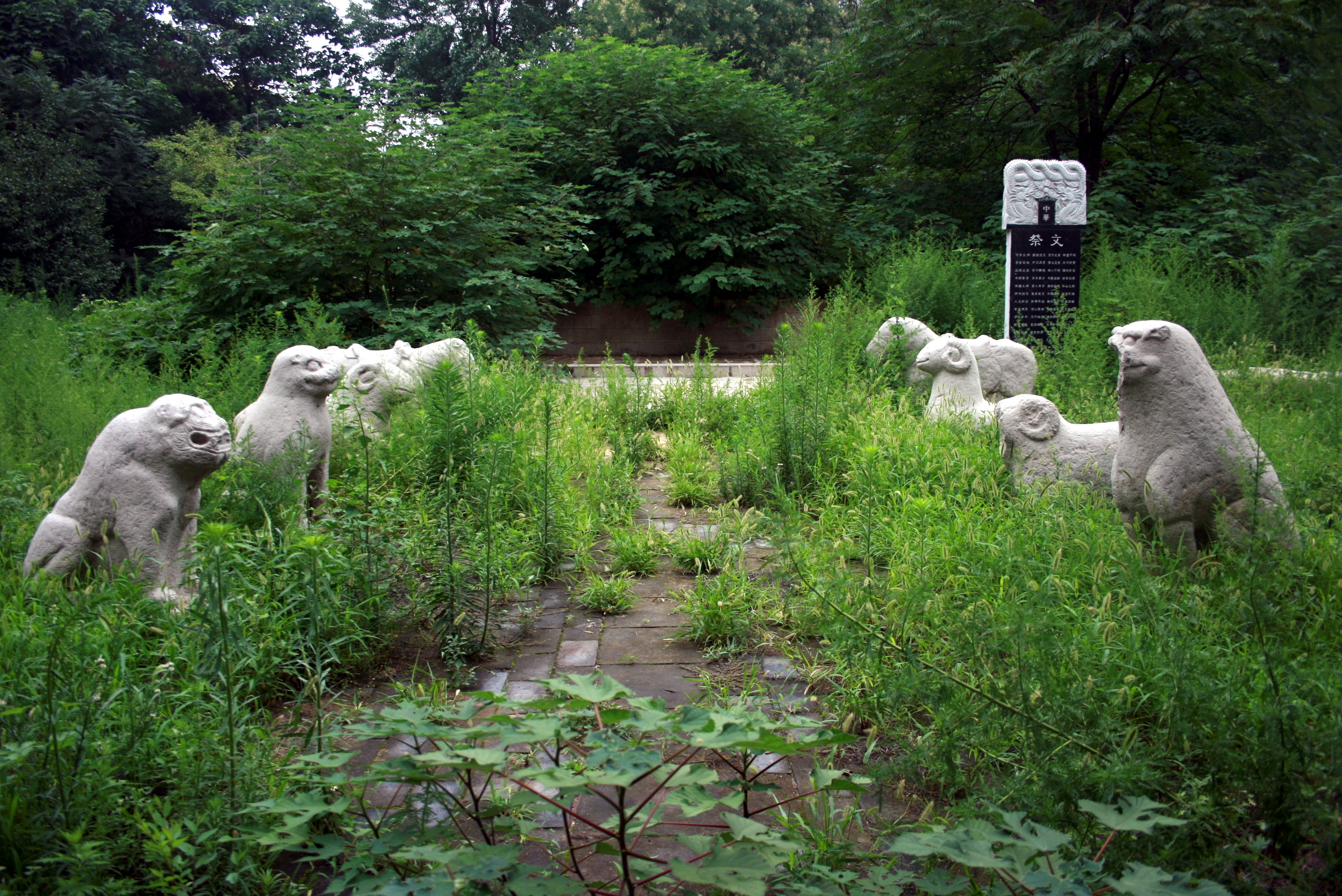
Spirit Way leading to the burial mound

The first records of the construction of an ancestral hall dedicated to Min Ziqian on the site in Jinan date to the year 1074 in the period of the Northern Song dynasty. Renovations were undertaken during the Yuan, Ming and Qing dynasties. Prior to the Cultural Revolution, the area covered by the memorial spanned about 300 meters in the north–south direction and 200 meters along the east–west axis. The burial mount had a diameter of 78 meters and a height of 10 meters. The site also featured more than 30 old trees and more than 10 historical stone sculptures. The memorial sustained significant damage during the Cultural Revolution, when the ancestral hall was torn down, masonry was destroyed, and trees were cut down. In September 1979, the memorial was identified as the first of Jinan's key historical sites deserving protection. At present, the site covers an area of only 60 (north–south) by 30 meters (east–west). A project to restore the tomb began in 1999, but ran out of funds.

== Location ==
The tomb is located to the east of Min Ziqian Road, adjacent to the Baihua Park, formerly known as "Catkins Park" in reference to the story about Min Ziqian's extraordinary filial piety.

== See also ==
- List of sites in Jinan
