= Yan Yan (philosopher) =

Disciple of Confucius

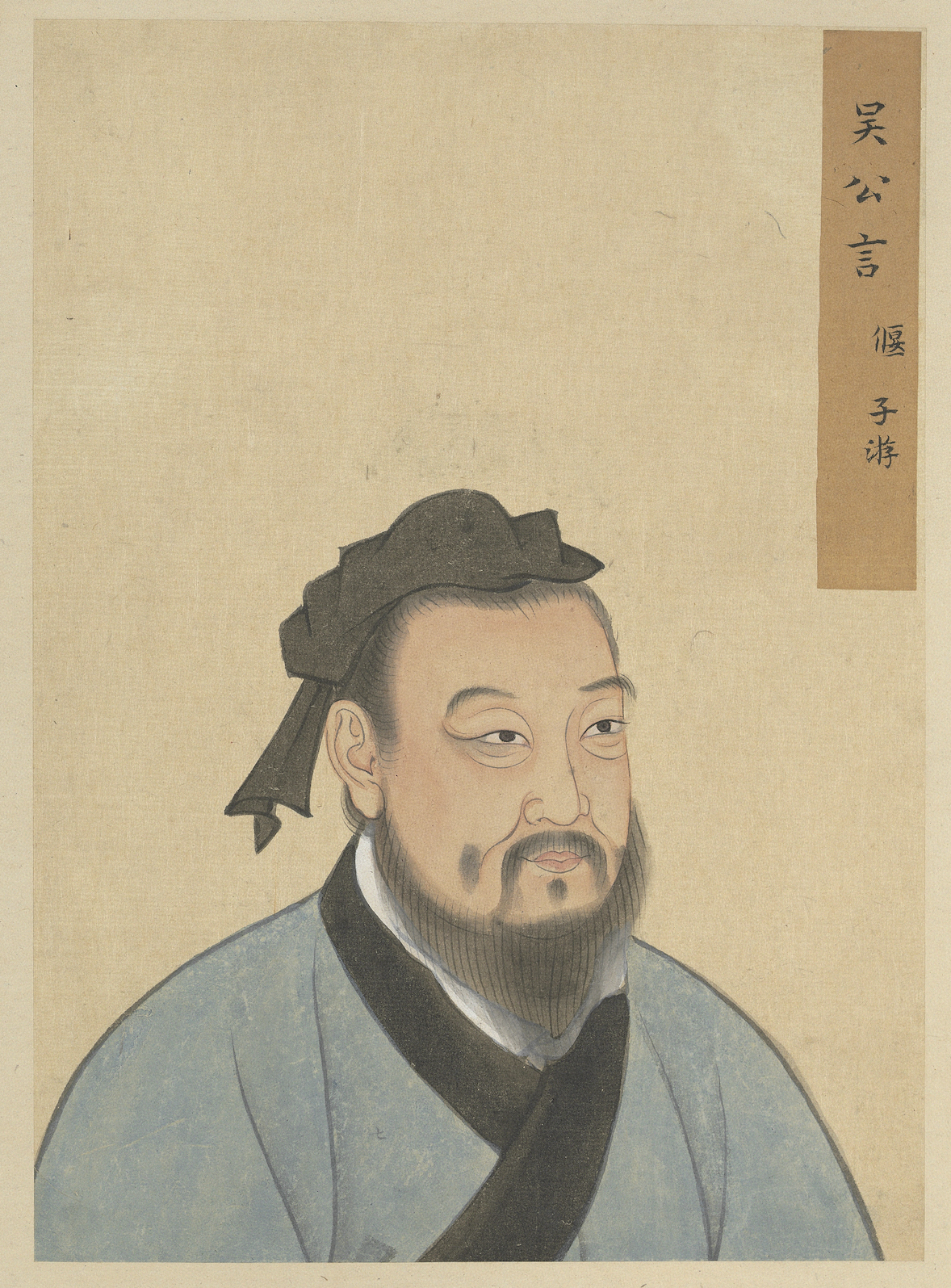
- Yan Yan in Half-Portraits of the Great Sage and Virtuous Men of Old (至聖先賢半身像), housed in the National Palace Museum
- Chinese: 言偃
Transcriptions
Standard Mandarin
- Hanyu Pinyin: Yán Yǎn
- Wade–Giles: Yen Yen

Other names

Ziyou (Courtesy name)
- Chinese: 子游
Transcriptions
Standard Mandarin
- Hanyu Pinyin: Zǐyóu
- Wade–Giles: Tzu-yu

Yan You
- Chinese: 言游
Transcriptions
Standard Mandarin
- Hanyu Pinyin: Yán Yóu
- Wade–Giles: Yen Yu

Yanzi
- Chinese: 言子
- Literal meaning: Master Yan
Transcriptions
Standard Mandarin
- Hanyu Pinyin: Yánzǐ
- Wade–Giles: Yen-tzu

Yan Yan (b. 506 BC), also known by his courtesy name Ziyou and as Yan You or Yanzi, was a prominent disciple of Confucius, considered by Confucius to be his most distinguished disciple in the study of the classics. A native of the state of Wu, he was the only known southerner among Confucius' disciples.

== Life ==
Yan Yan was born in 506 BC in the State of Wu. He was 45 years younger than Confucius.

Yan Yan served as commandant of Wucheng (Wu City) in the State of Lu. He was said to have succeeded in transforming the character of the people of Wucheng by teaching them ritual propriety and music, and was praised by Confucius.

After Confucius died, Ji Kangzi, prime minister of Lu, asked Yan why Confucius was not as widely mourned as Zichan, prime minister of the State of Zheng. Yan replied, "The influences of Zichan and my master might be compared to those of overflowing water and those of fattening rain. Wherever the water in its overflow reaches, men take knowledge of it, while the fattening rain falls unobserved."

In an episode recorded in the Book of Rites, Yan Yan was invited to the funeral of Sikou Huizi (司寇惠子), a high minister of the State of Wey. Huizi had designated a son born to a secondary wife (a shu son) as his heir, in violation of the prevailing convention. Yan Yan deliberately wore inappropriate clothes to the funeral, and stood in the wrong position. Sikou Huizi's brother Wenzi (司寇文子) reminded Yan Yan of his correct position, but Yan Yan refused to move. After realizing Yan Yan's intention, Wenzi placed Huizi's rightful heir, the eldest son by his main wife (a di son), in the position reserved for the heir.

== Legacy ==
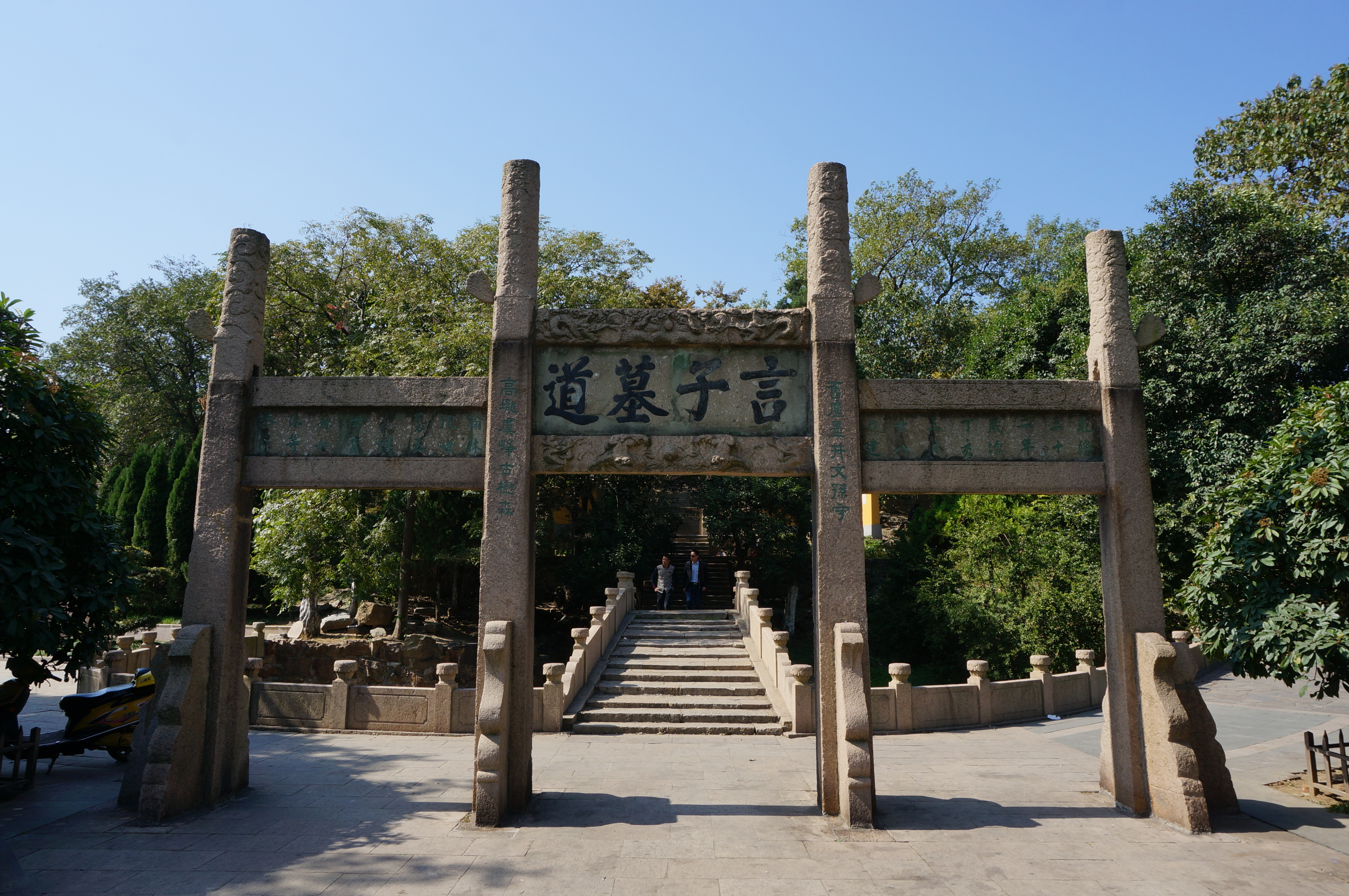
The first of three paifang of Yanzi's tomb

In Confucian temples, Yan Yan's spirit tablet is placed the fourth on the west, among the Twelve Wise Ones.

During the Tang dynasty, Emperor Xuanzong posthumously awarded Yan Yan the nobility title of Marquess of Wu (吳侯). During the Song dynasty, he was further awarded the titles of Duke of Danyang (丹陽公) and Duke of Wu (吳公).

Yan Yan's hometown is believed to be in modern Changshu, Jiangsu province, which was the territory of the State of Wu during the Spring and Autumn period. During the reign of Emperor Wu of Han (r. 156–87 BC), Yan Yan's descendants built a tomb complex for him in Changshu, and it has been rebuilt several times. His tomb is now a major tourist attraction in Changshu, and has been listed as a provincial cultural treasure by the Jiangsu government since 1982.

Yan Yan's offspring held the title of Wujing Boshi (五經博士; Wǔjīng Bóshì).

Many people from Changshu trace their ancestry to Yan Yan. Yan Dunyuan (言敦源, 1869–1932), Minister of Interior of the Republic of China, and calligrapher Yan Gongda (言恭达, born 1948) are among the most prominent.
