= Min Sun =

Prominent disciple of Confucius (536 – c. 487 BCE)

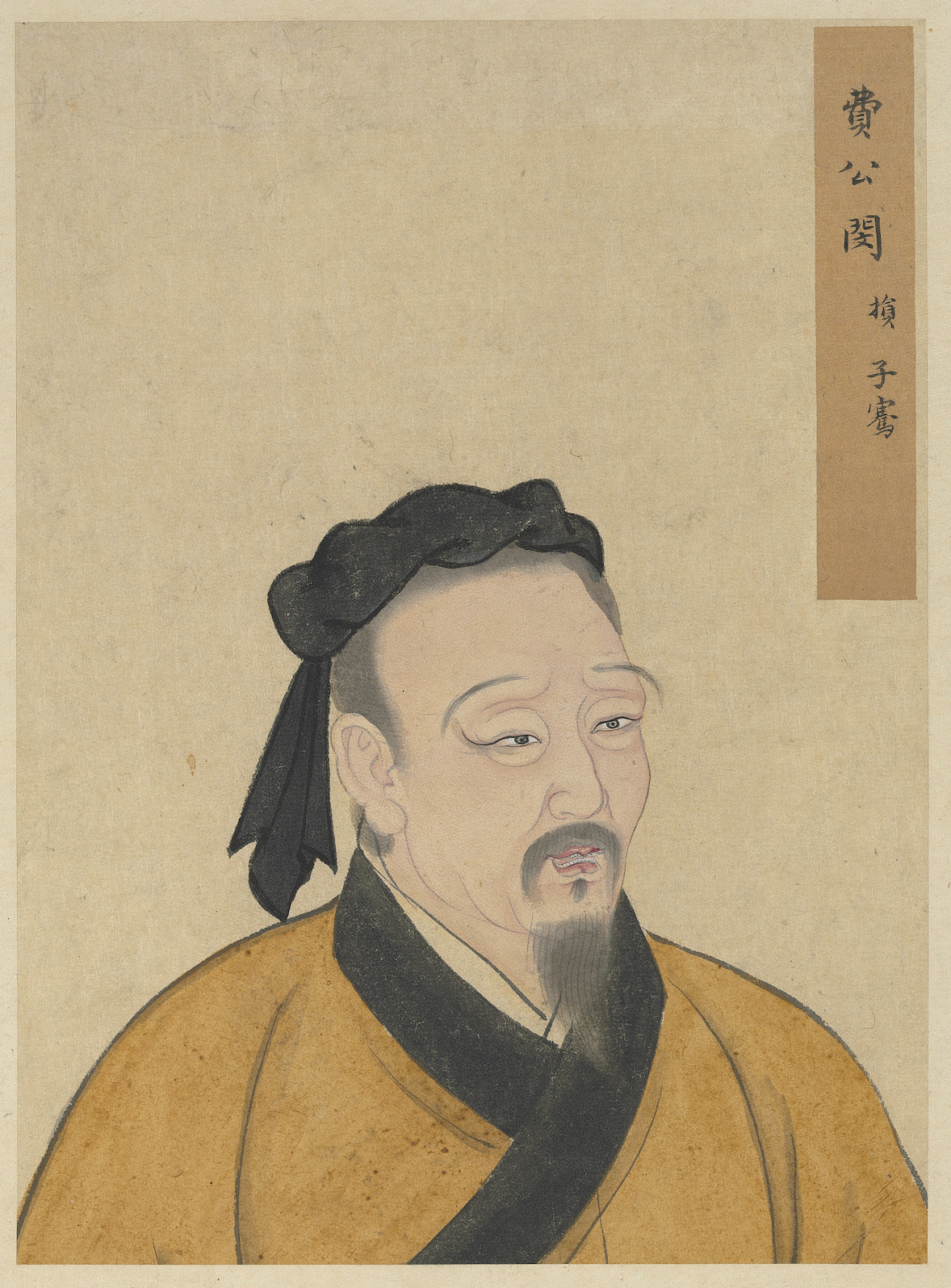
- Min Sun in the Half-Portraits of the Great Sage and Virtuous Men of Old (至聖先賢半身像), housed in the National Palace Museum
- Traditional Chinese: 閔損
- Simplified Chinese: 闵损
Transcriptions
Standard Mandarin
- Hanyu Pinyin: Mǐn Sǔn
- Wade–Giles: Min Sun

Other names

Ziqian
- Traditional Chinese: 子騫
- Simplified Chinese: 子骞
Transcriptions
Standard Mandarin
- Hanyu Pinyin: Zǐqiān
- Wade–Giles: Tzu-ch‘ien

Min Sun (536 – c. 487 BC), also known by his courtesy name Ziqian, was one of the most prominent disciples of Confucius. Confucius considered Min his second best disciple after Yan Hui, and commended him for his filial piety. His legend is included in the Confucian text The Twenty-four Filial Exemplars.

== Life ==
Min Sun was a native of the State of Lu. According to Sima Qian, he was fifteen years younger than Confucius, but the Narratives of the School states that he was fifty years younger.

When he first came to Confucius he had a starved look, but after studying with Confucius he gained a look of fullness and satisfaction. When Duanmu Ci once asked Min Sun how this change had come about, he replied, "I came from the midst of my reeds and sedges into the school of the Master. He trained my mind to filial piety, and set before me the examples of the ancient kings. I felt a pleasure in his instructions; but when I went abroad, and saw the people in authority, with their umbrellas and banners, and all the pomp and circumstance of their trains, I also felt pleasure in that show. These two things assaulted each other in my breast. I could not determine which to prefer, and so I wore that look of distress. But now the lessons of our Master have penetrated deeply into my mind. My progress also has been helped by the example of you my fellow disciples. I now know what I should follow and what I should avoid, and all the pomp of power is no more to me than the dust of the ground. It is on this account that I have that look of fullness and satisfaction." Min Sun was one of Confucius's favourite students. He was distinguished for his moral purity and his love for his parents. His place in the Temple of Confucius is on the first place on the east, among the Twelve Wise Ones, immediately following the Four Assessors. He was first sacrificed to, along with Confucius, in 720 AD, by the sixth emperor of the Tang dynasty. His title, the same as that of all but the four assessors, is "The Ancient Worthy, the Philosopher Min." The eleventh chapter of the Analects was traditionally attributed to his disciples.

== Twenty-four Filial Exemplars ==
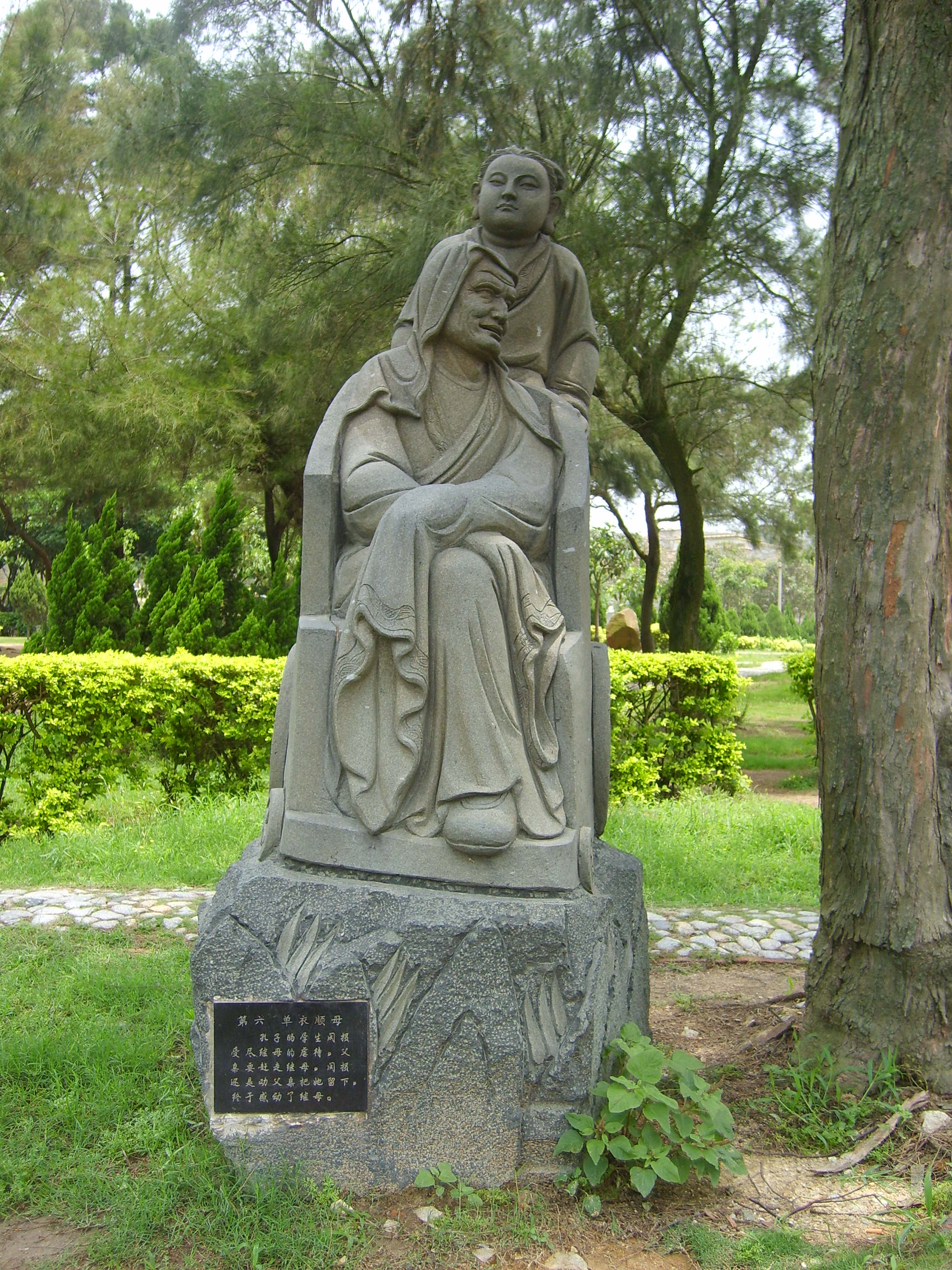
Statue illustrating Min Sun's story in The Twenty-four Filial Exemplars

Min Sun was one of the 24 Confucian paragons of filial piety. According to legend, his mother died when he was young; and, after his father remarried, he was raised by his stepmother. Under her care, he was abused and mistreated. His stepmother, during winter, would line her own sons' clothes with warm cotton, while she would line his clothes with weeds. One day, while taking his father out in a carriage, he almost succumbed to the cold. When his father learned what had happened, he went back to throw his wife out of the house. However, Min Sun said, "If mother leaves, there will be three of your sons who go cold, but if she stays, then only one will suffer." His stepmother was touched by his kindness and never mistreated him again.

== Legacy ==
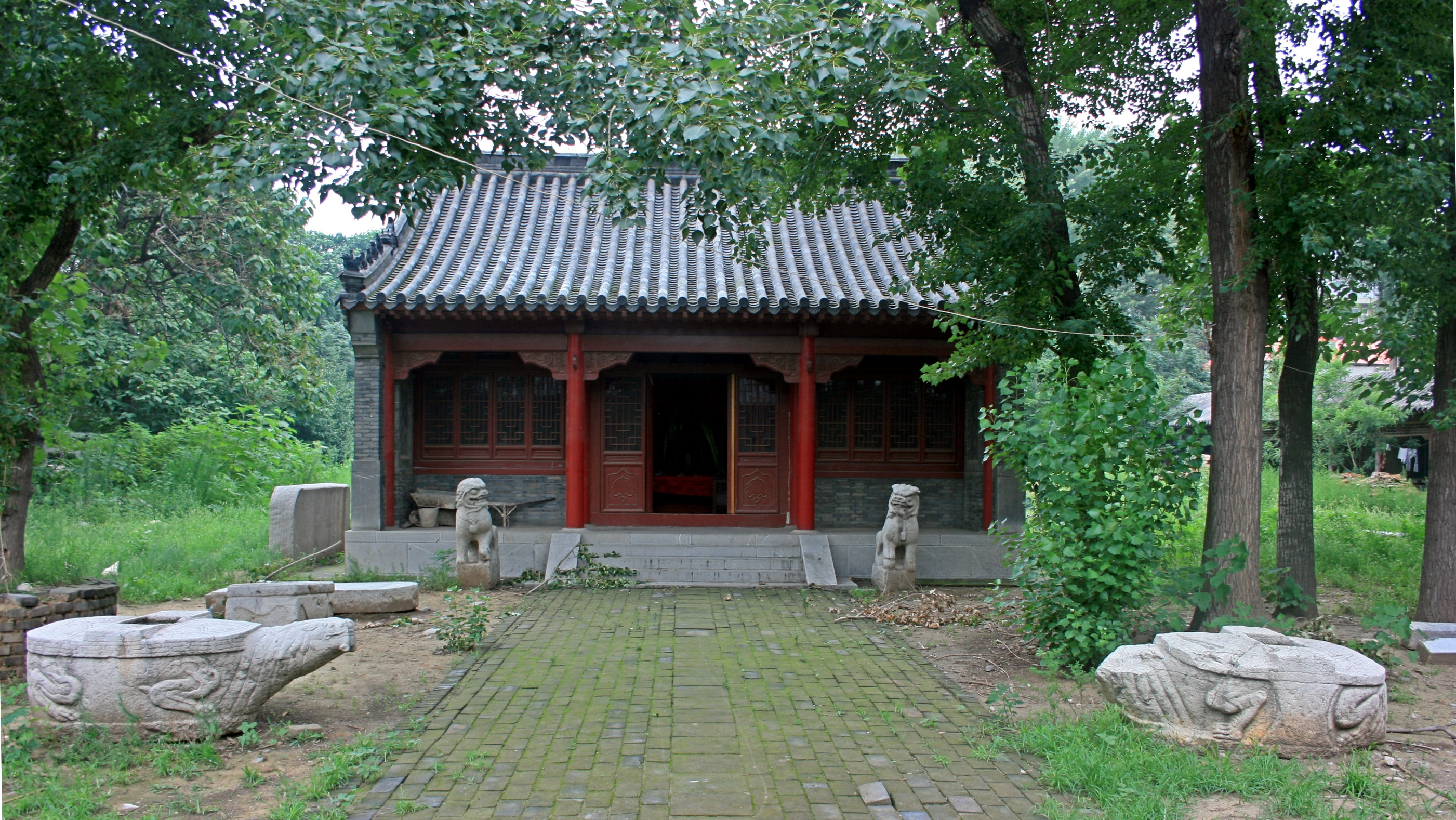
Memorial Tomb of Min Ziqian in Jinan, with two bixi turtles

In 739 AD, Emperor Xuanzong of Tang posthumously awarded Min Sun the nobility title Marquess of Fei (費侯), and during the Song dynasty, he was additionally awarded the titles of Duke of Langye (瑯琊公) and Duke of Fei (費公).

There are several memorial tombs and temples of Min Sun in China, including the Tomb of Min Ziqian in Jinan, Shandong, and the Min Ziqian Temple in Suzhou, Anhui, a major protected heritage site of Anhui province.

Min Sun's descendants held the title of Wujing Boshi (五經博士; Wǔjīng Bóshì).

== See also ==
- Yeoheung Min clan, prominent Korean clan that descend from Min Sun. Members include Queen Wongyeong and Empress Myeongseong.
