= Ran Geng =

Disciple of Confucius (born 544 BC)

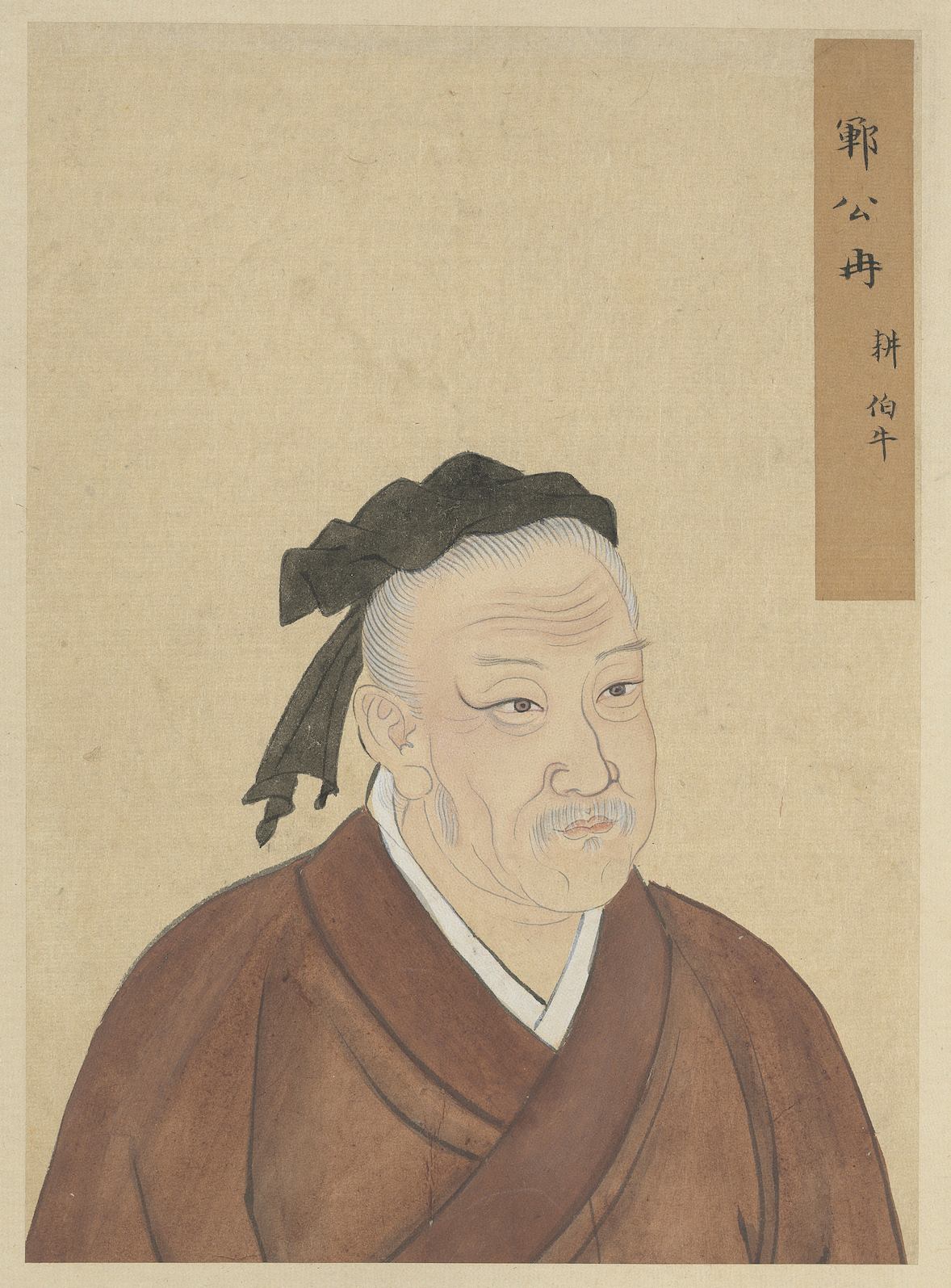
- Ran Geng in Half-Portraits of the Great Sage and Virtuous Men of Old (至聖先賢半身像), housed in the National Palace Museum
- Chinese: 冉耕
Transcriptions
Standard Mandarin
- Hanyu Pinyin: Rǎn Gēng
- Wade–Giles: Jan Keng

Other names

Boniu (Courtesy name)
- Chinese: 伯牛
- Literal meaning: Uncle Ox
Transcriptions
Standard Mandarin
- Hanyu Pinyin: Bóniú
- Wade–Giles: Po-niu

Ran Geng (born 544 BC), also known by his courtesy name Boniu, was one of the most prominent disciples of Confucius. Confucius considered him his third best disciple, after Yan Hui and Min Sun, in terms of moral conduct.

== Life ==
Ran Geng was a native of the State of Lu, and was only seven years younger than Confucius. He was from the same clan as Ran Yong and Ran Qiu, two other prominent disciples of Confucius. When Confucius served as the Minister of Justice of Lu, Ran became the magistrate of Zhongdu. He contracted a vile disease, possibly leprosy, and died young. Confucius lamented his early death with great pain.

== Legacy ==
In Confucian temples, Ran Geng's spirit tablet is placed the fourth among the Twelve Wise Ones, on the west.

Ran Geng's offspring held the title of Wujing Boshi (五經博士; Wǔjīng Bóshì).
