= Ran Yong =

Disciple of Confucius (born 522 BC)

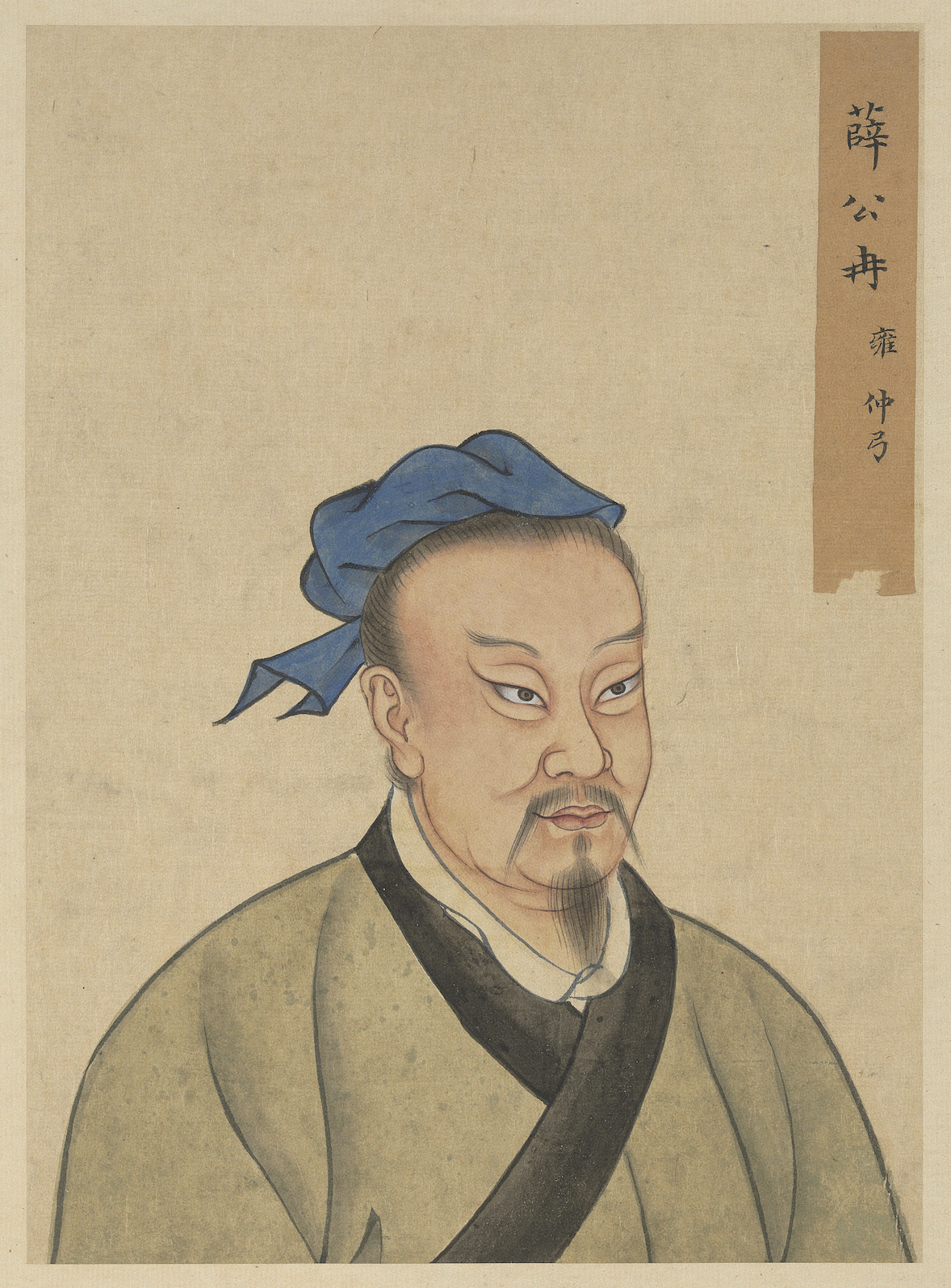
As depicted in Half Portraits of the Great Sage and Virtuous Men of Old (至聖先賢半身像), housed in the National Palace Museum

Ran Yong (Chinese: 冉雍; Wade–Giles: Jan Yung; born 522 BC), also known by his courtesy name Zhonggong (Chinese: 仲弓; Wade–Giles: Chung-kung), was one of the prominent disciples of Confucius. Confucius thought highly of his excellent moral conduct, and considered him fit to be the ruler of a state. After completing school, he served as chief officer of Jisun, the noble clan that dominated the politics of Lu.

Ran Yong was a native of the State of Lu. He was 29 years younger than Confucius, and was from the same clan as Ran Geng and Ran Qiu, two other prominent disciples of Confucius. He was of the same age as Ran Qiu. He was known for his moral integrity, despite being born to a father of lowly status, and Confucius declared that his background would not detract from his excellence. He was said to be not an eloquent speaker.

In Confucian temples, Ran Yong's spirit tablet is placed second among the Twelve Wise Ones, on the east.

Ran Yong's offspring held the title of Wujing Boshi (五經博士; Wǔjīng Bóshì).

== Bibliography ==
- Confucius (1997). The Analects of Confucius. Oxford University Press. ISBN 978-0-19-506157-4.
- Han, Zhaoqi (2010). "Biographies of Disciples of Confucius". Shiji (史记) (in Chinese). Beijing: Zhonghua Book Company. ISBN 978-7-101-07272-3.
- Legge, James (2009). The Confucian Analects, the Great Learning & the Doctrine of the Mean. Cosimo. ISBN 978-1-60520-644-8.
- Slingerland, Edward (2003). Analects: With Selections from Traditional Commentaries. Hackett Publishing. ISBN 1-60384-345-0.
