= Twelve Philosophers =

The Twelve Philosophers or Wise Ones (Chinese: 十二哲, Shí'èr Zhé) are 12 eminent philosophers in the Chinese Confucian tradition. They are traditionally accounted a kind of sainthood and their spirit tablets are prominently placed in Confucian temples, six upon the east and six upon the west side of the Hall of the Great Completion (Dacheng Dian).

Twelve Philosophers are Min Sun (Ziqian), Ran Yong (Zhonggong), Duanmu Ci (Zigong), Zhong You (Zilu), Bu Shang (Zixia), You Ruo (Ziruo), Zai Yu (Ziwo), Ran Geng (Boniu), Ran Qiu (Ziyou), Yan Yan (Ziyou), Zhuansun Shi (Zizhang) – all disciples of Confucius – and Zhu Xi, who established Neo-Confucianism during the Song dynasty.

Sacrifices to the philosophers were first offered in the 6th year of the Kaiyuan era of Emperor Xuanzong of the Tang dynasty, AD 720.

== See also ==
- Confucianism
- Disciples of Confucius
- Four Sages
