= Zai Yu =

Prominent disciple of Confucius (522–458 BC)

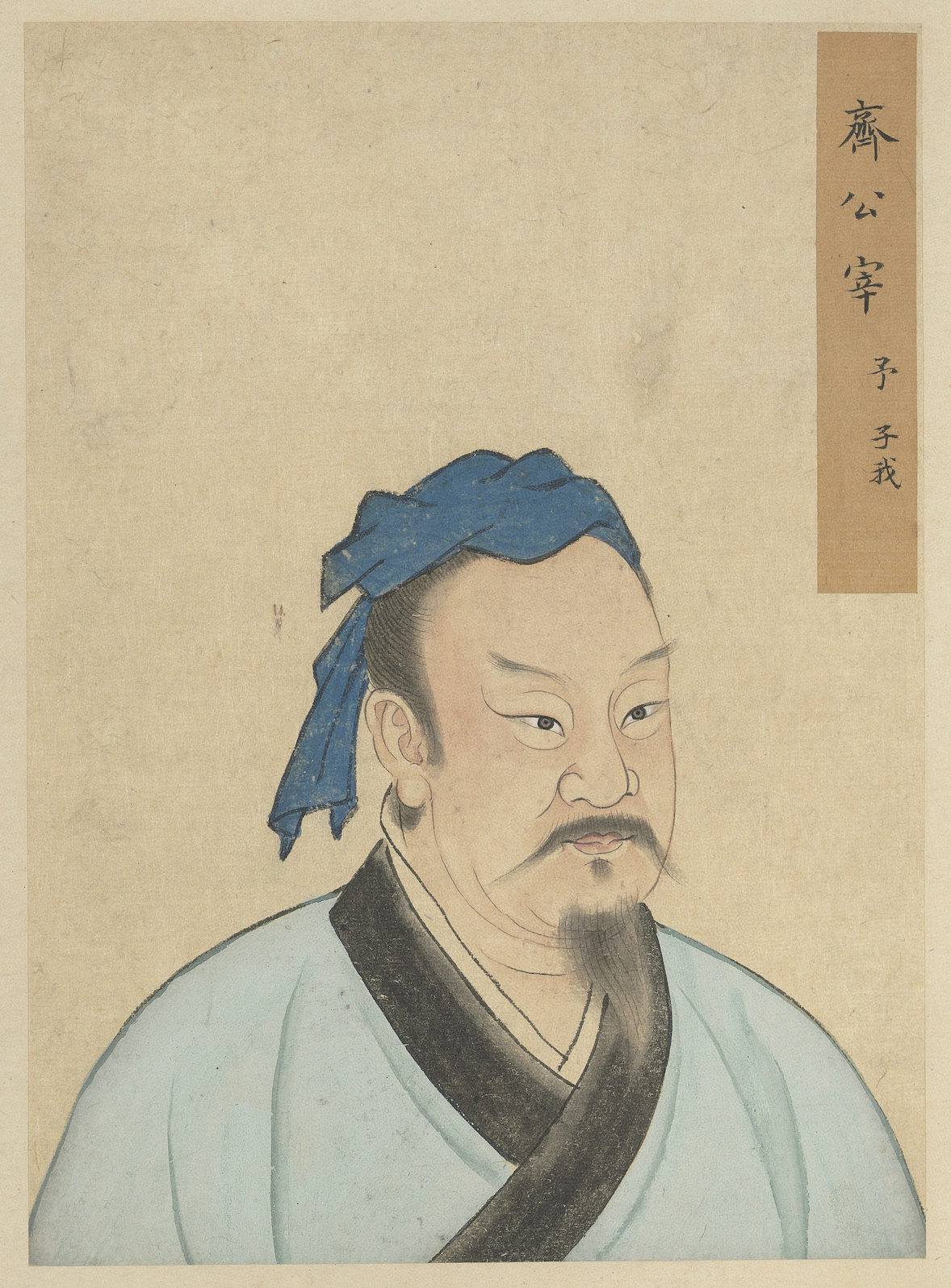
- Zai Yu in the Half-Portraits of the Great Sage and Virtuous Men of Old (至聖先賢半身像), housed in the National Palace Museum
- Chinese: 宰予
Transcriptions
Standard Mandarin
- Hanyu Pinyin: Zǎi Yǔ
- Wade–Giles: Tsai Yü
Southern Min
- Hokkien POJ: Cháiⁿ Ú

Other names

Ziwo (Courtesy name)
- Chinese: 子我
Transcriptions
Standard Mandarin
- Hanyu Pinyin: Zǐwǒ
- Wade–Giles: Tzu-wo
Southern Min
- Hokkien POJ: Chú-ngó͘

Zai Wo
- Chinese: 宰我
Transcriptions
Standard Mandarin
- Hanyu Pinyin: Zǎi Wǒ
- Wade–Giles: Tsai Wo
Southern Min
- Hokkien POJ: Cháiⁿ Ngó͘

Zai Yu (522–458 BC), also known by his courtesy name Ziwo and as Zai Wo, was a prominent disciple of Confucius, known for his gift in speech. However, Confucius severely criticized him for proposing to shorten the three-year mourning period after the death of a parent.

== Life ==
Zai Yu was a native of State of Lu. He was considered as the most eloquent speaker among Confucius' disciples. However, the only references of him in the Analects were Confucius' criticism of him. In an important discussion of mourning, Zai Yu questioned the necessity for the three-year mourning period after the death of a parent, and suggested a maximum of one year of mourning. Confucius severely criticized Zai Yu, describing him as inhuman. Confucius argued that children seldom leave their parents' arms in their first three years of life and asked rhetorically, did Zai Yu not receive these three years of tender care from his parents? Confucius also criticized him for sleeping during the day, comparing him to rotten wood that cannot be carved (朽木不可雕也). Despite the criticism, he remained one of the Master's close disciples.

According to Sima Qian's Records of the Grand Historian, Zai Yu served as a minister in Linzi, the capital of Qi, and was killed when he was involved in the rebellion of Chen Heng (陳恆) and his clan was exterminated. Sima Qian further says that Confucius was ashamed of Zai Yu's death. However, this account has been questioned by scholars since ancient times, as the Zuozhuan only mentions that Kan Zhi (阚止) was killed in Chen Heng's rebellion. As Kan Zhi was also known by his courtesy name Ziwo, which was identical to that of Zai Yu, Sima Qian may have conflated the two people's stories.

== Legacy ==
In Confucian temples, Zai Yu's spirit tablet is placed the second among the Twelve Wise Ones, on the west.

During the Tang dynasty, Emperor Xuanzong posthumously awarded Zai Yu the nobility title of Marquess of Qi (齊侯). Song dynasty emperors further awarded him the titles of Duke of Linzi (臨菑公) and Duke of Qi (齊公).
