= Ran Qiu =

Leading disciple of Confucius (born 522 BC)

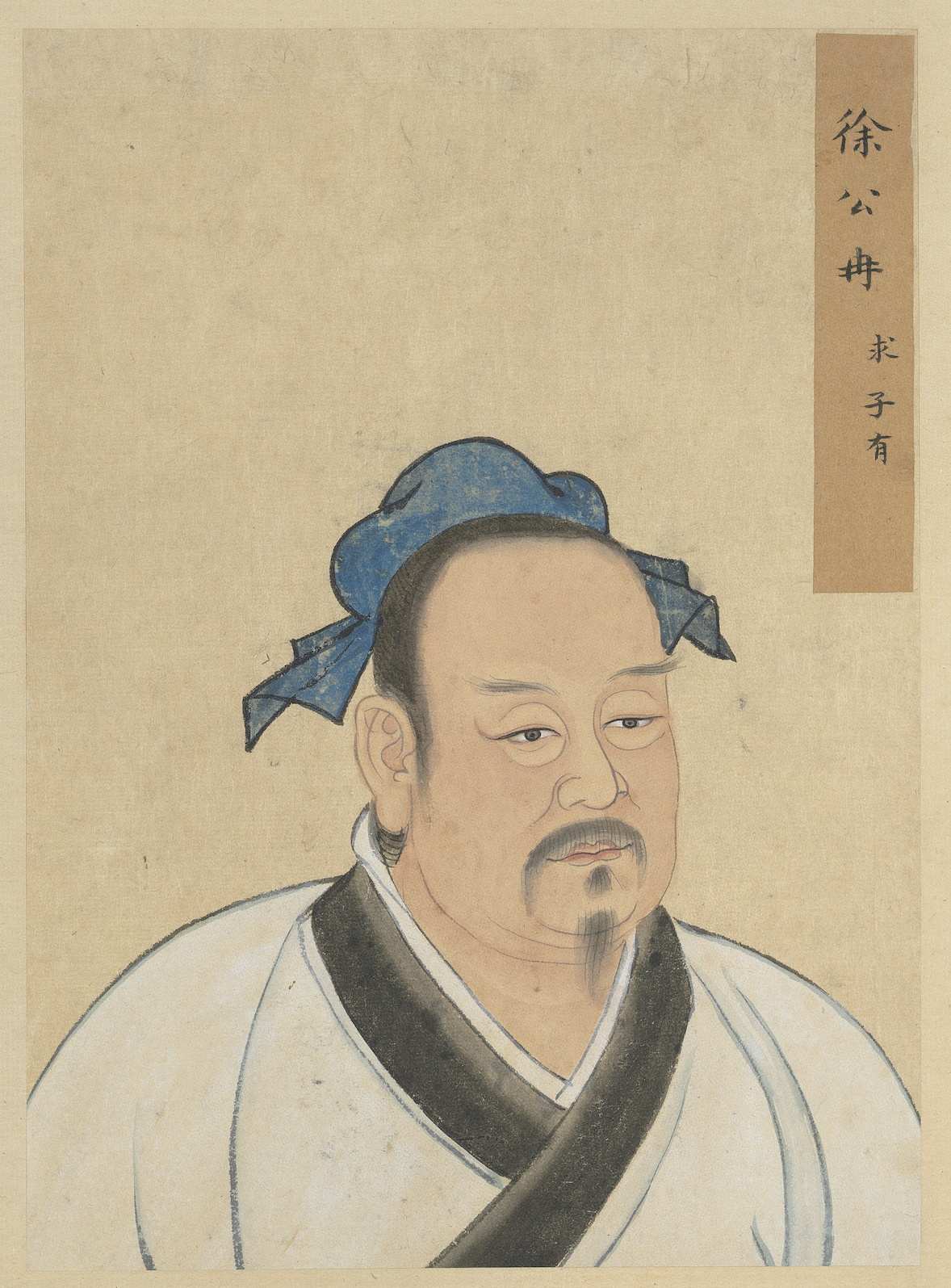
- Ran Qiu in Half-Portraits of the Great Sage and Virtuous Men of Old (至聖先賢半身像), housed in the National Palace Museum
- Chinese: 冉求
Transcriptions
Standard Mandarin
- Wade–Giles: Jan Ch‘iu

Other names

Ziyou (Courtesy name)
- Chinese: 子有
Transcriptions
Standard Mandarin
- Hanyu Pinyin: Zǐyǒu
- Wade–Giles: Tzu-yu

Ran You
- Chinese: 冉有
Transcriptions
Standard Mandarin
- Hanyu Pinyin: Rǎn Yǒu
- Wade–Giles: Jan Yu

Ran Qiu (born 522 BC), also known by his courtesy name Ziyou and as Ran You, was a leading disciple of Confucius. Among Confucius's disciples, he was the foremost in terms of ability and accomplishment in statesmanship. As a military commander of the State of Lu, he repelled an invasion from the neighbouring State of Qi. His influence in Lu facilitated the return of Confucius to his native state after fourteen years of exile.

== Life ==
Like Confucius, Ran Qiu was a native of the State of Lu, and was 29 years younger than the Master. He came from the same clan as Ran Geng and Ran Yong, two other prominent disciples of Confucius, and was of the same age as Ran Yong.

Ran Qiu is noted in the Analects (11.3) for his achievement in government affairs. He was employed in Confucius' household, before becoming the chief officer of the Jisun (or Ji) household, which dominated the politics of Lu. He served under Ji Kangzi (季康子), head of the Jisun family, who was the chief minister of Lu from 492 to 468 BC.

Ran Qiu professed little interest in Confucian rituals, and his ambition was in the administration of a state. Confucius thought he lacked the virtue of ren or humaneness, and severely criticized him for failing to prevent Ji Kangzi from attacking Zhuanyu (顓臾), a vassal state of Lu, and for helping the Jisun household accumulate massive amounts of wealth. So severe was Ran Qiu's violation of core Confucian values, that Confucius suggested that he no longer considered Ran his disciple.

In 484 BC, Lu was invaded by the neighbouring state of Qi. Ran Qiu was appointed commander of the Lu army, and defeated the Qi invaders. Owing to Ran Qiu's influence, Ji Kangzi invited Confucius to return to his native state of Lu, after fourteen years of exile.

== Legacy ==
Despite Confucius' severe criticism of Ran Qiu's conduct, the latter is still considered one of the Master's top ten disciples. In Confucian temples, his spirit tablet is placed third among the Twelve Wise Ones, on the west.

During the Tang dynasty, Emperor Xuanzong posthumously awarded Ran Qiu the nobility title of Marquess of Xu (徐侯). During the Song dynasty, he was further awarded the titles of Duke of Pengcheng (彭城公) and Duke of Xu (徐公).

Ran Qiu's offspring held the title of Wujing Boshi (五經博士; Wǔjīng Bóshì).
