= Disciples of Confucius =

Followers of the Chinese philosopher Confucius

According to Sima Qian, Confucius said: "The disciples who received my instructions, and could themselves comprehend them, were seventy-seven individuals. They were all scholars of extraordinary ability." It was traditionally believed that Confucius had three thousand students, but that only 72 mastered what he taught. The following is a list of students who have been identified as Confucius's followers. Very little is known of most of Confucius's students, but some of them are mentioned in the Analects of Confucius. Many of their biographies are recorded in the Sima Qian's Shiji. The Six Arts were practiced by the 72 disciples.

== Disciples ==
=== Yan Hui (Ziyuan) ===
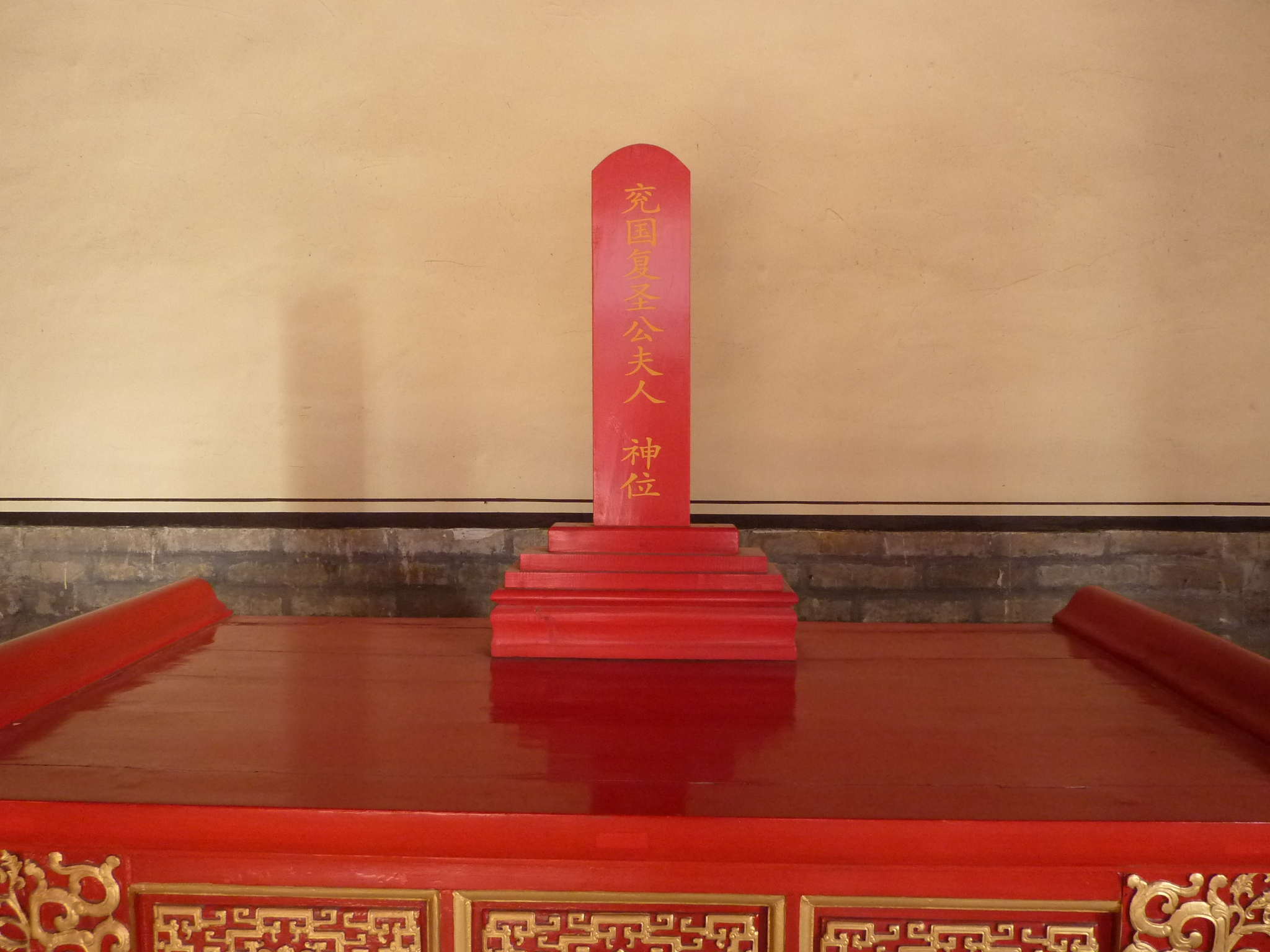
A tablet in honor of the wife of Yan Hui ("The Continuator of the Sage, Duke of Yanguo") in his temple in Qufu

Yan Hui (顏回) was a native of the Lu. His courtesy name was Ziyuan (子淵). He was Confucius's favorite student, and was younger than Confucius by 30 years. He became Confucius's disciple when he was very young. "After I got Hui," Confucius once said, "the disciples came closer to me." Confucius once traveled to Nang Hill with three of his favourite students, Hui, Zilu, and Zigong, and asked them each to tell him their different aims, after which he would choose between them. After Zilu's answer, Confucius said, "It marks your bravery." After Zigong's answer, Confucius said, "It shows your discriminating eloquence." Yan Hui spoke last, saying "I should like to find an intelligent king and sage ruler whom I might assist. I would diffuse among the people instructions on the five great points, and lead them on by the rules of propriety and music, so that they should not care to fortify their cities by walls and moats, but would fuse their swords and spears into implements of agriculture. They should send forth their flocks without fear into the plains and forests. There should be no sunderings of families, no widows or widowers. For a thousand years there would be no calamity of war. Yu would have no opportunity to display his bravery, or Ts'ze to display his oratory." After hearing Yan Hui's answer, Confucius said, "How admirable is this virtue!"

When Hui was 29, his hair turned completely white, and at age 32 he died. The first emperor of the Han dynasty sacrificed to both him and Confucius. In the Confucian sacrificial Canon his title, "Continuator of the Sage", was conferred in the ninth year of the Jiajing era of the Ming dynasty, in 1530 AD, when almost all of the present sacrificial titles of the worthies in the Temple of Confucius were fixed. Hui's place is on the east of the sage. He is considered the first of the Four Assessors, the most senior disciple of Confucius.

=== Min Sun (Ziqian) ===
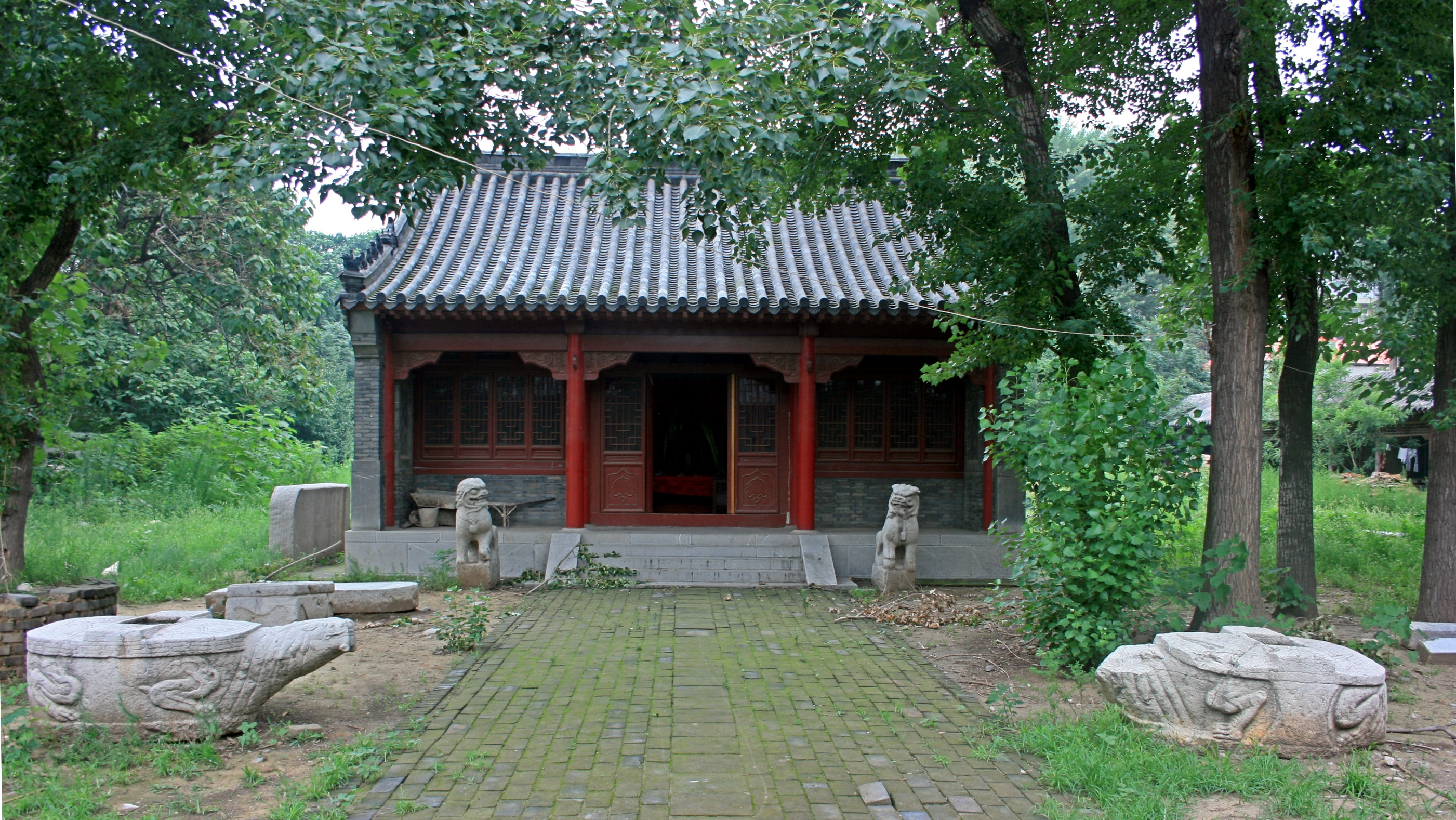
A symbolic tomb of Min Ziqian, with two ancient-looking bixi turtles

Min Sun (閔損) was one of Confucius's students from the State of Lu. His courtesy name was Ziqian (子騫). According to Sima Qian he was 15 years younger than Confucius, but other sources state that he was 50 years younger. When he first came to Confucius he had a starved look, but after studying with Confucius he gained a look of fullness and satisfaction. When Zigong once asked Min Sun how this change had come about, he replied, "I came from the midst of my reeds and sedges into the school of the Master. He trained my mind to filial piety, and set before me the examples of the ancient kings. I felt a pleasure in his instructions; but when I went abroad, and saw the people in authority, with their umbrellas and banners, and all the pomp and circumstance of their trains, I also felt pleasure in that show. These two things assaulted each other in my breast. I could not determine which to prefer, and so I wore that look of distress. But now the lessons of our Master have penetrated deeply into my mind. My progress also has been helped by the example of you my fellow disciples. I now know what I should follow and what I should avoid, and all the pomp of power is no more to me than the dust of the ground. It is on this account that I have that look of fullness and satisfaction." Min Sun was one of Confucius's most favourite students. He was distinguished for his moral purity and his love for his parents. His place in the Temple of Confucius is on the first place on the east, among "The Wise Ones", immediately following the Four Assessors. He was first sacrificed to, along with Confucius, in 720 AD, by the sixth emperor of the Tang dynasty. His title, the same as that of all but the four assessors, is "The Ancient Worthy, the Philosopher Min." The eleventh chapter of the Analects was traditionally attributed to his disciples.

Min Sun is most well known for his love and respect for his parents. His mother died when he was young; and, after his father remarried, he was raised by his stepmother. Under her care, he was abused and mistreated. His stepmother, during winter, would line her own sons' clothes with warm cotton, while she would line his clothes with weeds. One day, while taking his father out in a carriage, he almost succumbed to the cold. When his father learned what had happened, he went back to throw his wife out of the house. However, Min Sun said, "If mother leaves, there will be three of your sons who go cold, but if she stays, then only one will suffer." His stepmother was touched by his kindness and never mistreated him again.

=== Ran Geng (Boniu) ===
Ran Geng (冉耕) was a native of Lu, and Confucius's junior by only seven years. His courtesy name was Boniu (伯牛). When Confucius became Lu's Minister of Crime, he appointed Boniu to the office from which he had just been promoted, Commandant of Zhongdu. His tablet is now fourth among "The Wise Ones", on the west.

=== Ran Yong (Zhonggong) ===
Ran Yong (冉雍) was of the same clan as Ran Geng, and 29 years younger than Confucius. His courtesy name was Zhonggong (仲弓). He had a bad father, but the Master declared that this was not to be counted against him, to detract from his admitted excellence. He had a reputation for integrity, but not for being an eloquent speaker (Analects 5.5). His place in the Temple of Confucius is second among "The Wise Ones", to the east.

=== Ran Qiu (Ziyou) ===
Ran Qiu (冉求) was related to Ran Gong and Ran Yong. His courtesy name was Ziyou (子有). He was the same age as Rong Yong. He was noted among Confucius's students for his versatile abilities and many talents. Zigong said that he was "respectful to the old and kind to the young; attentive to guests and visitors; fond of learning and skilled in many arts; diligent in his examination of things." When a minor official of Lu asked Confucius about Ran Qiu's qualities, Confucius praised him as having modest administrative ability (Analects 5.7). After studying with Confucius Ran Qiu took an official position working for the ministers who had usurped power in Lu, but did not himself have enough power or ability to influence his employers to follow a more ethical course of action (Analects 3.6). He once disappointed Confucius, and was rebuked for telling him that he loved Confucius's Way, but that he lacked the strength to pursue it (Analects 6.12). Later, it was by the influence of Ran Qiu that Confucius was finally able to return to Lu. His place in the Temple of Confucius is third among "The Wise Ones", to the west.

=== Zhong You (Zilu) ===
Zhong You (仲由) was a native of Pian (卞) in Lu, of yeren origin. He was only nine years younger than Confucius. His courtesy names were Zilu (子路) and Jilu (季路). At their first interview, Confucius asked him what he was fond of, and he replied, "My long sword."

Confucius said, "If to your present ability there were added the results of learning, you would be a very superior man."

"Of what advantage would learning be to me?" asked Zilu. "There is a bamboo on the southern hill, which is straight itself without being bent. If you cut it down and use it, you can send it through a rhinoceros's hide: what is the use of learning?"

"Yes", said Confucius; "but if you feather it and point it with steel, will it not penetrate more deeply?"

Zilu bowed twice, and said, "I will reverently receive your instructions."

Confucius later said, "From the time that I got You, bad words no more came to my ears." Confucius admired Zilu for his courage, but was concerned that he might lack other virtues (such as good judgement) that would have balanced this courage, potentially turning Zilu's courage into a vice (Analects 5.7; see also 8.2, 17.8, and 17.23). After studying with him, Confucius later praised Zilu as his having exceptional administrative ability and being capable of handling duties of national importance (Analects 5.7). After completing his studies with Confucius, Zilu became chief magistrate of the district of Pu, where his administration commanded the warm commendations of Confucius. His violent death in Wei is accounted in the Zuo zhuan (480 BCE). Zilu's tablet is now the fourth, to the east, from those of the Assessors.

=== Zai Yu (Ziwo) ===
Zai Yu (宰予) was a native of Lu, but his age is unknown. He was stubborn at first, and cared much about how he looked. His courtesy name was Ziwo (子我). He had "a sharp mouth", according to Sima Qian. Once, when he was at the court of Chu on some commission, King Chao offered him an easy carriage adorned with ivory to return to Confucius. Yu replied, "My Master is a man who would rejoice in a government where right principles were carried out, and can find his joy in himself when that is not the case. Now right principles and virtue are as it were in a state of slumber. His wish is to rouse and put them in motion. Could he find a prince really anxious to rule according to them, he would walk on foot to his court and be glad to do so. Why need he receive such a valuable gift as this from so great a distance?" Confucius later commended Zai Yu for this reply.

Zai Yu is not portrayed well in the Analects. He took service in Qi, and was the chief magistrate governing the Qi capital of Linzi. While employed in Qi he joined with Tian Chang in a rebellion. After this rebellion was suppressed, his actions led to the destruction of his extended family and made Confucius ashamed of him. His place in the Temple of Confucius is second among "The Wise Ones", to the west.

=== Duanmu Ci (Zigong) ===
Duanmu Ci (端木賜) was a native of Wei, and 31 years younger than Confucius. His courtesy name was Zigong (子貢). He had mental sharpness and ability, and appears in the Analects as one of the most forward talkers among Confucius's students. Confucius said, "From the time that I got Ci, scholars from a distance came daily resorting to me." According to Zhu Xi, Zigong was a merchant who later became wealthy through his own efforts, and developed a sense of moral self-composure through the course of his work. (His past profession as a merchant is elaborated in Analects 11.18).

When he first came to Confucius he quickly demonstrated an ability to grasp Confucius's basic points, and refined himself further through Confucius's education. He is later revealed to have become a skillful speaker and an accomplished statesman (Analects 11.3), but Confucius may have felt that he lacked the necessary flexibility and empathy towards others necessary for achieving consummate virtue (ren): he once claimed to have achieved Confucius's moral ideal, but was then sharply dismissed by the Master (Analects 5.12); later he is criticized by Confucius for being too strict with others, and for not moderating his demands with an empathic understanding of others' limitations (Analects 14.29). He is one of the Confucius's students most commonly referred to in the Analects, also appearing in Analects 9.6, 9.13, 11.13, 13.20, 14.17, and 17.19.

Duke Ching of Qi once asked Zigong how Confucius was to be ranked as a sage, and he replied, "I do not know. I have all my life had the sky over my head, but I do not know its height, and the earth under my feet, but I do not know its thickness. In my serving of Confucius, I am like a thirsty man who goes with his pitcher to the river, and there he drinks his fill, without knowing the river's depth."

After studying with Confucius, Zigong became Commandant of Xinyang, and Confucius gave him this advice: "In dealing with your subordinates, there is nothing like impartiality; and when wealth comes in your way, there is nothing like moderation. Hold fast these two things, and do not swerve from them. To conceal men's excellence is to obscure the worthy; and to proclaim people's wickedness is the part of a mean man. To speak evil of those whom you have not sought the opportunity to instruct is not the way of friendship and harmony." After leaving Confucius, Zigong served in high offices in both in Lu and Wei, and finally died in Qi. Following Confucius's death, many of the disciples built huts near their Master's grave, and mourned for him three years, but Zigong remained there, mourning alone for three years more. His place in the Temple of Confucius is third among "The Wise Ones", to the east of the Assessors. The fifth chapter of the Analects was traditionally attributed to his disciples.

=== Yan Yan (Ziyou) ===
Yan Yan (言偃) was a native of Wu (吳). His courtesy name was Ziyou (子游). He was 45 years younger than Confucius, and was distinguished for his literary achievements. After studying with Confucius he was made Commandant of Wuchang. While being employed as a government official there he was successful in transforming the character of the people by teaching them ritual propriety and music, and was praised by Confucius. After the death of Confucius, Ji Kang asked Yan how it was possible that Confucius was not as widely mourned as Zichan (a famous Duke of Zheng), after whose death men laid aside their bow rings and girdle ornaments, women laid aside their pearls and earrings, and the sounds of weeping could be heard in the streets for three months. Yan replied, "The influences of Zichan and my Master might be compared to those of overflowing water and those of fattening rain. Wherever the water in its overflow reaches, men take knowledge of it, while the fattening rain falls unobserved." His place in the Temple of Confucius is fourth in the western range of "The Wise Ones."

=== Bu Shang (Zixia) ===
It is not certain what state Bu Shang (卜商) was a native of, but he was said to have been born either in Wei or Wen. His courtesy name was Zixia (子夏). He was 45 years younger than Confucius and lived to a great age, for in 406 BC (73 years after Confucius's death) he was recorded serving at the court of Prince Wan of Wei, to whom he gave copies of some of the classics. He is represented as an extensively well-read and exacting scholar but one without great comprehension of mind. The Maojing is said to contain his philosophical views. Gongyang Gao and Guliang Chi studied the Spring and Autumn Annals with him. When Zixia died, his son wept so greatly it is said that he became blind. In the Temple of Confucius, he is placed in the fifth east position, among "The Wise Ones".

=== Zhuansun Shi (Zizhang) ===
Zhuansun Shi (顓孫師) was a native of Chen, and was 48 years younger than Confucius. His courtesy name was Zizhang (子張). Zigong said of him: "Not to boast of his admirable merit; not to signify joy on account of noble station; neither insolent nor indolent; showing no pride to the dependent: these are the characteristics of Zhuansun Shi." When he was sick and close to death, he called his son Shanxiang to him, and said, "We speak of his end in the case of a superior man, and of his death in the case of a mean man. May I think that it is going to be the former with me to-day"? In the Temple of Confucius, he is placed in the fifth west position, among "The Wise Ones".

=== Zeng Shen (Ziyu) ===
Zeng Shen [or Can] (曾參) was a native of South Wu in Lu, and 46 years younger than Confucius. His courtesy name was Ziyu (子輿 or 子與). When he was 16 he was sent by his father into Chu, where Confucius was then teaching, to learn under the sage. Confucians later considered him to be his second most senior student, after Yan Hui. Zigong said of him, "There is no subject which he has not studied. His appearance is respectful. His virtue is solid. His words command credence. Before great men he draws himself up in the pride of self-respect. His eyebrows are those of longevity." He was noted for his filial piety, and after the death of his parents he could not read the rites of mourning without being led to think of them and being moved to tears. He was a voluminous writer. He composed ten books, compiled in the Rites of the Elder Tai (大戴禮). He was said to have composed and/or edited the Classic of Filial Piety under the direction of Confucius. He was also associated with transmission of the Great Learning. He was first associated with the sacrifices to Confucius in 668 AD, but in 1267 he was advanced to be one of the sage's four Assessors. His title, "Exhibitor of the Fundamental Principles of the Sage", dates from the period of Jiajing, when he was associated with Yan Hui.

=== Tantai Mieming (Ziyu) ===
Tantai Mieming (澹臺滅明) as a native of Wu-chang. His courtesy name was Ziyu (子羽). Sima Qian said that Ziyu was 39 years younger than Confucius, but other records state that he was 49 years younger. He was excessively ugly, and Confucius thought poorly of his talents following consequence his first meeting with him. After completing his studies, he travelled to the south, as far as the Yangtze River. Traces of his presence in that part of the country are still pointed out in the department of Suzhou. He attracted three hundred students, to whom he laid down rules for their guidance in their intercourse with princes. When Confucius heard of his success, he confessed how he had been led by his bad looks to misjudge him. He, with nearly all the disciples whose names follow, first had a place assigned to him in the sacrifices to Confucius in 739 AD. in the Temple of Confucius his tablet is placed on the second, east, in the outer court, beyond that of the "Assessors" and "Wise Ones".

=== Fu Buqi (Zijian) ===
Fu Buqi (宓不齊) was a native of Lu; and, according to different accounts, 30, 40 or 49 years younger than Confucius. His courtesy name was Zijian (子賤). After studying under Confucius he became the Commandant of Danfu, where he succeeded in his position easily. Wuma Qi, having served in the same office, and succeeding only by virtue of great industry and toil, asked Zijian for advice. Zijian answered, "I employ men; you employ men's strength." People later pronounced Fu to be a superior man. In Analects 5.3 Confucius himself uses the evidence of Zijian's exemplary character to demonstrate that Lu had retained a culture of high moral quality. His writings are mentioned in Liu Xin's catalogue of important books. In the Temple of Confucius his tablet is placed on the second place on the west.

=== Yuan Xian (Zisi) ===
Yuan Xian (原憲) was either a native of Song; or, according to Zhang Xuan, of Lu. His courtesy name was Zisi (子思). He was younger than Confucius by 36 years. He was noted for his purity and modesty, and for his happiness in the principles of the Master while suffering deep poverty. After the death of Confucius, he lived in obscurity in Wei. His tablet in the Temple of Confucius is next to that of Ziyu. The fourteenth chapter of the Analects was traditionally attributed to his disciples.

=== Gongye Chang (Zichang) ===
Gongye Chang (aka. Gongye Zhi) (公冶長 or 公冶芝) was Confucius's son-in-law. His courtesy names were Zichang (子長) and Zizhi (子之). He was either a native of Lu or Qi. In the Temple of Confucius, his tablet is next to Buji's.

In Analects 5.1 Confucius says of Gongye Chang: "He is marriageable. Although he was once imprisoned as a criminal, he was in fact innocent of any crime." Confucius then married his daughter to him. Chinese legends and folklore later attributed to him the ability to talk with birds and other animals. In one story, he overhears a group of birds discussing the location of a murder victim. His knowledge of the body later leads him to be arrested for the person's murder, but he is released after demonstrating his supernatural powers to his jailers. Although the exact nature of his offence is not known outside of this pseudohistory, Confucius's marriage of his daughter to him despite the strong stigma attached to criminals in the Zhou dynasty demonstrates Confucius's adherence to moral reason and his independence from arbitrary social conventions.

=== Nangong Kuo (Zirong) ===
Nangong Kuo (南宮括) may have been the same person as Nangong Zhangshu, who accompanied Confucius to the Zhou king's court. He was also called Nanguo Shi (南宮适)and Nanguo Tao (南宮縚), and his courtesy name was Zirong (子容). Once, while he was serving Duke Ai of Qin, a fire broke out at the palace. While others attempted to secure the contents of the treasury, Nangong directed his efforts to saving the palace library, and it was because of his efforts that numerous ancient texts (possibly the most important being the Rites of Zhou) survived. His tablet in the Temple of Confucius is on the east, next to Yuan Xian's.

=== Gongxi Ai (Jici) ===
Gongxi Ai (公皙哀) was either a native of Lu or Qi. His courtesy names were Jici (季次) and Jichan (季沉). Confucius commended him for refusing to accept employment with any of the noble families who had gained power through usurpation, choosing instead to endure severe poverty rather than sacrifice his principles. His tablet in the Temple of Confucius follows Gongye's.

=== Zeng Dian (Xi) ===
Zeng Dian (曾蒧/點) was the father of Zeng Shan. His courtesy name was Xi (皙). In the Temple of Confucius his tablet is in the hall to Confucius's ancestors, where it is the first on the west side. In Analects 11:25 Zeng Dian is portrayed as a musician whose modest political aspirations are similar to those of Confucius himself.

=== Yan Wuyou (Lu) ===
Yan Wuyou (顏無繇) was the father of Yan Hui, and was younger than Confucius by only six years. His courtesy name was Lu (路). In the Temple of Confucius his tablet is the first on the east side in the same hall as Zeng Dian.

=== Shang Qu (Zimu) ===
Shang Qu (商瞿) was traditionally believed to have received the Yijing from Confucius and preserved it through a line of transmitters until the early Han dynasty, when it became widely disseminated. His courtesy name was Zimu (子木). In the Temple of Confucuis his tablet follows that of Nangong Kuo.

=== Gao Chai (Zigao) ===
Gao Chai (高柴) was either a native of Qi or Wei. His courtesy names were Zigao (子羔) and Jigao (季羔). He was either 30 or 40 years younger than Confucius, and was dwarfish and ugly but very intelligent and talented. After studying with Confucius he became a criminal judge in Wei, and once famously condemned a prisoner to lose his feet. Later, when Gao Chai was forced to flee Wei, that same man helped to save his life. Confucius praised Chai for being able to administer stern justice with such a spirit of benevolence that the people he judged could not resent him. In the Temple of Confucius his tablet is next to that of Gongxi Ai.

=== Qidiao Kai (Zikai) ===
Qidiao Kai (漆雕開), or Shang Zhu (漆雕開), was either a native of Cai or Lu. His courtesy names were Zikai (子開), Ziruo (子若), and Zixiu (子修/脩). Little is known about him, except that he was a scholar of the Shujing. Confucius was pleased with him for his modesty and for his realistic assessments of himself and other people (Analects 5.6). In the Temple of Confucius his tablet follows that of Shang Zhu.

=== Gongbo Liao (Zizhou) ===
Gongbo Liao (公伯僚) appears in Analects 14:33, where he slanders Zilu to Confucius. His courtesy name was Zizhou (子周). It is disputed whether he should really be considered one of Confucius's disciples.

=== Sima Geng (Niu) ===
Sima Geng (司馬耕) was a great talker and a native of Song. His courtesy names were Niu (牛) and Shugeng (黍耕). He spent a great amount of energy escaping from the negative influence of his brother. In the Temple of Confucius his tablet follows that of Qidiao Kai.

=== Fan Xu (Zichi) ===
Fan Xu (樊須) also known as Fan Chi (樊迟) was either a native of Qi or Lu. His courtesy name was Zichi (子遲). He was either 36 or 46 years younger than Confucius. When he was young he distinguished himself as a military commander, serving in the armies of the Ji family. In the Temple of Confucius his tablet follows that of Gao Chai.

=== You Ruo (Ziruo) ===
You Ruo (有若) （also known as 'Youzi' (有子) in the Analects) was a native of Lu, but Chinese historians do not agree on his age. His courtesy name was Ziruo (子若). He was noted among Confucius's students for his great memory and fondness for antiquity. After Confucius died the rest of his disciples, because Ruo looked and sounded like Confucius, wanted to defer to him as if he was Confucius, but after Zeng Shan objected they abandoned this idea.

In the Temple of Confucius, the tablet of Ziruo is now the sixth on the east side, among "The Wise Ones". His tablet was promoted to this position only relatively recently, in 1714 during the Qianlong era of the Qing dynasty. This was done after a request from a high-ranking government official, who said he was motivated to act following a dream. His real motives may have been a desire to do Justice to the merits of Ziruo, and to restore the symmetry of the tablets in the "Hall of the Great and Complete One", which had been disturbed by the introduction of the tablet of Zhu Xi during the Yongzheng era of the Qing dynasty.

=== Gongxi Chi (Zihua) ===
Gongxi Chi (公西赤) was a native of Lu. His courtesy name was Zihua (子華). He was younger than Confucius by 42 years. He was notable for his knowledge of ritual and propriety, and Confucius's other students deferred to him on the arrangement of Confucius's funeral. Confucius praised him as being competent to entertain guests and visitors at court (Analects 5.7). In the Temple of Confucius his tablet is the fourth on the west side, in the outer court.

=== Wuma Shi (Ziqi) ===
Wuma Shi (巫馬施), aka. Wuma Qi (巫馬期), was either a native of Chen or of Lu. His courtesy name was Ziqi (子期 or 子旗). He was 30 years younger than Confucius. On one occasion, when Confucius was about to set out with a company of the disciples on a journey, he told them to take umbrellas. Later that day it rained heavily, and Wuma asked Confucius, "There were no clouds in the morning; but after the sun had risen, you told us to take umbrellas. How did you know that it would rain?"

Confucius replied, "The moon last evening was in the constellation Pi, and is it not said in the Shijing, 'When the moon is in Pi, there will be heavy rain?' It was thus I knew it." In the Temple of Confucius his tablet is on the east side, next to that of Sima Gang.

=== Liang Zhan (Shuyu) ===
Liang Zhan (梁鱣), aka. Liang Li (梁鯉), was a native of Qi. His courtesy name was Shuyu (叔魚). He was either 29 or 39 years younger than Confucius. When he was 30, being disappointed that he had no son, he was thinking about divorcing his wife. "Do not do so," said Shang Zhu to him. "I was 38 before I had a son, and my mother was then about to take another wife for me, when the Master proposed sending me to Qi. My mother was unwilling that I should go, but Confucius said, 'Don't be anxious. Zhu will have five sons after he is 40.' It has turned out so, and I apprehend it is your fault, and not your wife's, that you have no son yet." Zhan took this advice; and, two years later, he had a son. In the Temple of Confucius his tablet occupies the eighth place on the west side, among the tablets of the outer court.

=== Yan Xing (Ziliu) ===
Yan Xing (顏幸), also called Yan Xi (顏辛), Yan Liu (顏柳), and Yan Wei (顏韋), was a native of Lu. His courtesy name was Ziliu (子柳). He was 46 years younger than Confucius. In the Temple of Confucius his tablet is on the east side, after Wuma Shi.

=== Ran Ru (Zilu) ===
Ran Ru (冉孺) was a native of Lu. His courtesy names were Zilu (子魯), Zi-zeng (子曾), and Ziyu (子魚). He was 50 years younger than Confucius. In the Temple of Confucius his tablet is on the west side, following that of Liang Zhan.

=== Cao Xu (Zixun) ===
Cao Xu (曹卹) was a native of Cai. His courtesy name was Zixun (子循). He was 50 years younger than Confucius. In the Temple of Confucius his tablet is on the east side, following that of Yan Xing.

=== Bo Qian (Zixi) ===
Bo Qian (伯虔) was a native of Lu. His courtesy names were Zixi (子皙/析) and Zijie (子楷). He was 50 years younger than Confucius. In the Temple of Confucius Bo Qian's tablet follows that of Cao Xu, on the west.

=== Gongsun Long (Zishi) ===
Gongsun Long (公孫龍), also called Gonsun Chong (公孫寵), was either a native of Wei, Chu, or Zhao. His courtesy name was Zishi (子石). He was 53 years younger than Confucius. Once, before he had met Confucius, Zishi met Zigong, who asked him "Have you not learned the Book of Poetry?"

Zishi replied, "What leisure have I to do so? My parents require me to be filial; my brothers require me to be submissive; and my friends require me to be sincere. What leisure have I for anything else?"

"Come to my Master," said Zigong, "and learn of him." In the temple of Confucius, Gongsun Long's tablet follows that of Zixun.

== Less known disciples ==
Sima Qian here observes: 'Of the 35 disciples which precede, we have some details. Their age and other particulars are found in the Books and Records. It is not so, however, in regard to the 52 which follow.'

36. Ran Ji, styled Zi-chan [al. Ji-chan and Zi-da] (冉季, 子產 [al. 季產 and 子達]), a native of Lu, whose place is the 11th, west, next to Bo Qian.

37. Gongzu Gouzi or simply Zi, styled Zi-zhi (公祖勾茲 [or simply 茲], 子之), a native of Lu. His tablet is the 23rd, east, in the outer court.

38. Qin Zu, styled Zi-nan (秦祖, 子南), a native of Qin. His tablet precedes that of the last, two places.

39. Qidiao Chi, styled Zi-lian (漆雕哆 [al. 侈], 子斂), a native of Lu. His tablet is the 13th, west.

40. Yan Gao, styled Zi-jiao (顏高, 子驕). According to the 'Narratives of the School,' he was the same as Yan Ke (刻, or 剋), who drove the carriage when Confucius rode in Wei after the duke and Nan-zi. But this seems doubtful. Other authorities make his name Chan (產), and style him Zi-jing (子精). His tablet is the 13th, east.

41. Qidiao Dufu [al. Cong], styled Zi-you, Zi-qi and Zi-wen (漆雕徒父 [al. 從], 子有 [al. 子友], 子期 and 子文), a native of Lu, whose tablet precedes that of Qidiao Chi.

42. Zeng Sichi, styled Zi-tu, or Zi-cong (壤 [al. 穰] 駟赤, 子徒, or 子從), a native of Qin. Some consider Zengsi (壤駟) to be a double surname. His tablet comes after that of No. 40.

43. Shang Zhai, styled Zi-ji and Zi-xiu (商澤, 子季 and 子秀), a native of Lu. His tablet is immediately after that of Fan Xu, No. 26.

44. Shi Zuo [al. Zhi and Zi]-shu, styled Zi-ming (石作 [al. 之 and 子]蜀, 子明). Some take Shizuo (石作) as a double surname. His tablet follows that of No. 42.

45. Ren Buji, styled Xuan (任不齊, 選), a native of Chu, whose tablet is next to that of No. 28.

46. Gongliang Ru, styled Zi-zheng (公良孺 [al. 儒], 子正), a native of Qin, follows the preceding in the temples. The 'Sacrificial Canon' says:-- 'Zi-zheng was a man of worth and bravery. When Confucius was surrounded and stopped in Pu, Zi-zheng fought so desperately, that the people of Pu were afraid, and let the Master go, on his swearing that he would not proceed to Wei.'

47. Hou [al. Shi] Chu [al. Qian], styled Zi-li [al. Li-chi] (后 [al. 石]處 [al. 虔], 子里 [al. 里之]), a native of Qi, having his tablet the 17th, east.

48. Qin Ran, styled Kai (秦冉, 開), a native of Cai. He is not given in the list of the 'Narratives of the School,' and on this account his tablet was put out of the temples in the ninth year of Jiajing. It was restored, however, in the second year of Yongzhang, AD 1724, and is the 33rd, east, in the outer court.

49. Gongxia Shou, styled Sheng or Zi-sheng (公夏首 [al. 守], 乘 or 子乘), a native of Lu, whose tablet is next to that of No. 44.

50. Xi Yongdian [or simply Dian], styled Zi-xi [al. Zi-jie and Zi-qie] (系容蒧 [or 點], 子皙 [al. 子偕 and 子楷]), a native of Wei, having his tablet the 18th, east.

51. Gong Jianding [al. Gong Yu], styled Zi-zhong (公肩 [al. 堅]定 [al. 公有], 子仲 [al. 中 and 忠]). His nativity is assigned to Lu, to Wei, and to Jin (晉). He follows No. 46.

52. Yan Zu [al. Xiang], styled Xiang and Zi-xiang (顏祖 [al. 相], 襄 and 子襄), a native of Lu, with his tablet following that of No. 50.

53. Jiao [al. Wu]dan, styled Zi-jia (鄡 [al. 鄔]單, 子家), a native of Lu. His place is next to that of No. 51.

54. Zhu [al. Gou] Jing-qiang [and simply Jing], styled Zi-qiang [al. Zi-jie and Zi-mang] (句 [al. 勾 and 鉤] 井疆 [and simply 井], 子疆 [al. 子界 and 子孟]), a native of Wei, following No. 52.

55. Han [al. Zai]-fu Hei, styled Zi-hei [al. Zi-suo and Zi-su] (罕 [al. 宰] 父黑, 子黑 [al. 子索 and 子素]), a native of Lu, whose tablet is next to that of No. 53.

56. Qin Shang, styled Zi-pei [al. Pei-zi and Bu-zi] (秦商, 子丕 [al. 丕茲 and 不茲]), a native of Lu, or, according to Zhang Xuan, of Chu. He was 40 years younger than Confucius. One authority, however, says he was only four years younger, and that his father and Confucius's father were both celebrated for their strength. His tablet is the 12th, east.

57. Shen Dang, styled Zhou (申黨, 周). In the 'Narratives of the School' there is a Shen Ji, styled Zi-zhou (申續, 子周). The name is given by others as Tang (堂 and 儻) and Zu (續), with the designation Zi-zu (子續). These are probably the same person mentioned in the Analects as Shen Chang (申棖). Prior to the Ming dynasty they were sacrificed to as two, but in AD 1530, the name dang was expunged from the sacrificial list, and only that of Chang left. His tablet is the 31st, east.

58. Yan Zhipo, styled Zi-shu [or simply Shu] (顏之僕, 子叔 [or simply 叔]), a native of Lu, who occupies the 29th place, east.

59. Yong Qi, styled Zi-qi [al. Zi-yan] (榮旂 [al. 祈], 子旗 or 子祺 [al. 子顏]), a native of Lu, whose tablet is the 20th, west.

60. Xian Chang, styled Zi-qi [al. Zi-hong] (縣成, 子棋 [al. 子橫]), a native of Lu. His place is the 22nd, east.

61. Zuo Renying [or simply Ying], styled Xing and Zi-xing (左人郢 [or simply 郢], 行 and 子行), a native of Lu. His tablet follows that of No. 59.

62. Yan Zhi, styled En [al. Zi-si] (燕伋 [or 級], 恩 [al. 子思]) a native of Qin. His tablet is the 24th east.

63: Zhang Guo, styled Zi-tu (鄭國, 子徒), a native of Lu. This is understood to be the same with the Xue Bang, styled Zi-cong (薛邦, 子從), of the 'Narratives of the School.' His tablet follows No. 61.

64. Qin Fei, styled Zi-zhi (秦非, 子之), a native of Lu, having his tablet the 31st, west.

65. Shi Zhichang, styled Zi-hang [al. chang] (施之常, 子恆 [al. 常]), a native of Lu. His tablet is the 30th, east.

66. Yan Kuai, styled Zi-sheng (顏噲, 子聲), a native of Lu. His tablet is the next to that of No. 64.

67. Bu Shusheng, styled Zi-che (步叔乘 [in the 'Narratives of the School' it is an old form of 乘], 子車), a native of Qi. Sometimes for Bu (步) we find Shao (少). His tablet is the 30th, west.

68. Yuan Kang, styled Zi-ji (原亢, 子籍), a native of Lu. Sima Qian calls him Yuan Kang-ji, not mentioning any designation. The 'Narratives of the School' makes him Yuan Kang (抗), styled Ji. His tablet is the 23rd, west.

69. Yue Ke [al. Xin], styled Zi-sheng (樂欬, [al. 欣], 子聲), a native of Lu. His tablet is the 25th, east.

70. Lian Jie, styled Yong and Zi-yung [al. Zi-cao] (廉潔, 庸 and 子庸 [al. 子曹]), a native of Wei, or of Qi. His tablet is next to that of No. 68.

71. Shuzhung Hui [al. Kuai], styled Zi-qi (叔仲會 [al. 噲], 子期), a native of Lu, or, according to Zhang Xuan, of Jin. He was younger than Confucius by 54 years. It is said that he and another youth, called Kong Xuan (孔琁), attended by turns with their pencils, and acted as amanuenses to the sage, and when Mang Wubo expressed a doubt of their competency, Confucius declared his satisfaction with them. He follows Lian Jie in the temples.

72. Yan He, styled Ran (顏何, 冉), a native of Lu. The present copies of the 'Narratives of the School' do not contain his name, and in AD 1588 Ran was displaced from his place in the temples. His tablet, however, has been restored during the Qing. It is the 33rd, west.

73. Di Hei, styled Zhe [al. Zi-zhe and Zhe-zhi] (狄黑, 晢 [al. 子晢 and 晢之]), a native of Wei, or of Lu. His tablet is the 26th, east.

74. Kui [al. Bang] Sun, styled Zi-lian [al. Zi-yin] (□ (kui1 刲左邦右) [al. 邦] 巽, 子歛 [al. 子飲]), a native of Lu. His tablet is the 27th, west.

75. Kong Zhong, styled Zi-mie (孔忠, 子蔑). This was the son, it is said, of Confucius's elder brother, the cripple Mang-pi. His tablet is next to that of No. 73. His sacrificial title is 'The ancient Worthy, the philosopher Mie.'

76. Gongxi Yuru [al. Yu], styled Zi-shang (公西輿如 [al. 輿], 子上), a native of Lu. His place is the 26th, west.

77. Gongxi Dian, styled Zi-shang (公西蒧 [or 點], 子上 [al. 子尚]), a native of Lu. His tablet is the 28th, east.

78. Qin Zhang [al. Lao], styled Zi-kai (琴張 [al. 牢], 子開), a native of Wei. His tablet is the 29th, west.

79. Chan Kang, styled Zi-kang [al. Zi-qin] (陳亢, 子亢 [al. 子禽]), a native of Ch'an.

80. Xian Dan [al. Dan-fu and Fang], styled Zi-xiang (縣亶 [al. 亶父 and 豐], 子象), a native of Lu. Some suppose that this is the same as No. 53. The advisers of the Qing dynasty in such matters, however, have considered them to be different, and in 1724, a tablet was assigned to Xian Dan, the 34th, west.

The three preceding names are given in the 'Narratives of the School.'

== Twenty others added by scholars ==
The research of scholars has added about 20 others.

81. Lin Fang, styled Zi-qiu (林放, 字子邱), a native of Lu. The only thing known of him is from the Ana. III. iv. His tablet was displaced under the Ming, but has been restored by the Qing. It is the first, west.

82. Zhu Yuan, styled Bo-yu (蘧瑗, 字伯玉), an officer of Wei, and, as appears from the Analects and Mencius, an intimate friend of Confucius. Still his tablet has shared the same changes as that of Lin Fang. It is now the first, east.

83 and 84. Shen Chang (申棖) and Shen Tang (申堂). See No. 57.

85. Mu Pi (牧皮), mentioned by Mencius, VII. Pt. II. xxxvii. 4. His entrance into the temple was under the Qing. His tablet is the 34th, east.

86. Zuo Qiuming or Zuoqiu Ming (左丘明) or Qiu Ming (丘明) has the 32nd place, east. His title was fixed in AD 1530 to be 'The Ancient Scholar,' but in 1642 it was raised to that of 'Ancient Worthy.' To him we owe the most distinguished of the annotated editions of the Chun Qiu. But whether he really was a disciple of Confucius, and in personal communication with him, is much debated.

The above are the only names and surnames of those of the disciples who now share in the sacrifices to the sage. Those who wish to exhaust the subject, mention in addition, on the authority of Zuo Qiuming, Zhongsun Heji (仲孫何忌), a son of Meng Xizi (孟僖子), and Zhongsun Shuo (仲孫說), little brother of Zhongsun Heji, supposed by many to be the same with No. 17; Ru Bei, (孺悲), mentioned in the Analects, XVII. xx, and in the Li Ji, XVIII. Sect. II. ii. 22; Gongwang Zhiqiu (公罔之裘) and Xu Dian (序點), mentioned in the Li Ji, XLIII. 7; Binmou Jia (賓牟賈), mentioned in the Li Ji, XVII. iii. 16; Kong Xuan (孔琁) and Hai Shulan (惠叔蘭), on the authority of the 'Narratives of the School;' Chang Ji (常季), mentioned by Zhuangzi; Ju Yu (鞫語), mentioned by Yanzi (晏子); Lian Yu (廉瑀) and Lu Jun (魯峻), on the authority of Wenweng Shishi 文翁石室; and finally Zifu He (子服何), the Zifu Jingbo (子服景伯) of the Analects, XIV. xxxviii.

== Four Sages and Twelve Philosophers ==
Other than Confucius himself, the most venerated Confucians are the "Four Sages" or "Correlates" and the "Twelve Philosophers".
