= Kong Bo Ji =

Chinese noblewoman (died 476 BC)

Kong Bo Ji (Chinese: 衛伯姬, 6th-century BC – 476 BC), was a Chinese noblewoman.

She was the daughter of Duke Ling of Wey (r. 534–492 BC), sister of Duke Zhuang II of Wey, and paternal aunt of Duke Chu of Wey.

She was married to Kong Wenzi and the mother of Kong Li. When her nephew Duke Chu of Wey became ruler in 481 BC, her son was appointed Minister of the Ancestral Temple. She and her lover Hun Liangfu convinced by her exiled brother to persuade her son to depose Duke Chu and place her brother on the throne. The coup succeeded, and her brother Duke Zhuang II was placed upon the throne. When in power, however, her brother executed her lover. When her brother was deposed and Duke Chu reinstated, he had her executed.

She is depicted in Two Disorderly Women of Wei in the Biographies of Eminent women (Lienü zhuan) alongside Lady Nanzi and described as "a lustful concubine", blamed for the succession crisis and accused of having caused the "disorder of five generations".
