= Yeren (disambiguation) =

The yeren is a legendary hybrid beast-man of Hubei Province, China.

Yeren (野人) may also refer to:

- Yeren (Zhou dynasty), a Zhou dynasty term for peasants and commoners
- Yeren Jurchens, an ethnic group identified by the Ming Dynasty

== See also ==
- Yiren (disambiguation)
