= Lady Nanzi =

Spouse of Duke Ling of Wei (died 480 BC)

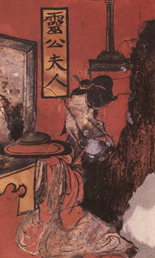
Nanzi (南子, detail). Lacquer painting over wood, Northern Wei

Nanzi (南子) also called Wey Ling Nanzi (died 480 BC) was the consort of Duke Ling of Wey (r. 534–492 BC) in the Spring and Autumn period. She was most famous for her meeting with Confucius in 496 BC. She was de facto ruler of Wey, as her spouse was not interested in politics.

== Life ==
Nanzi was a native of Song, possibly a daughter of Duke Ping of Song. At some point she married Duke Ling of Wey and was favoured by her husband. Because her spouse lacked interest in government issues and effectively retired from politics, he left her to conduct the affairs of state for him with his approval. Alongside Fu Hao, Yi Jiang and Queen Dowager Xuan, she is one of only four women noted as influential political players in China prior to Empress Lü, and perhaps the first woman to have ruled a Chinese state.

In 497 BC, Gongshu Shu (公叔戌), a minister of Wey, wanted to send away Nanzi's supporters in the court. In response, Nanzi accused Shu of plotting a coup. Already hated by Duke Ling for his wealth, Gongshu Shu fled to Lu.

In 496 BC, Nanzi had an affair with Zhao of Song (depicted as her brother in some accounts), who had been summoned to Wey on her behalf. Duke Ling's eldest son Kuaikui heard a song that mocked the affair ("Since you have allayed the heat of your sow, why not send back our old boar?") and was enraged. Kuaikui tried to kill Nanzi but she escaped. Duke Ling took her side, and Kuaikui was driven out of Wey along with his courtiers.

In 492 BC, Duke Ling died. Duchess Nanzi wanted to enthrone prince Ying in line with Duke Ling's wishes. Ying refused the proposition, but instead recommended Zhe, son of his exiled brother Kuaikui. Zhe succeeded Duke Ling as Duke Chu of Wey.

In 481 BC, Kuaikui returned and ousted his son to become Duke Zhuang II of Wey. Nanzi was executed by the ruling Duke Zhuang in 480 BC.

== Nanzi and Confucius ==
Nanzi is remembered for her meeting with Confucius when the latter visited Wey in 496 BC. Nanzi summoned Confucius, telling him that he had to meet her first to gain access to her husband the duke. Confucius reluctantly paid Nanzi a visit. His disciple Zilu was displeased about this, prompting Confucius to exclaim: "Wherein I have done improperly, may Heaven reject me, may Heaven reject me!" ("予所否者、天厭之、天厭之").

One month later, upon seeing Duke Ling and Nanzi riding the same chariot, Confucius commented "I have never seen a person who loves virtue as much as he loves beauty" before leaving Wey.

== In popular culture ==
Nanzi is depicted in the Depraved Favorites section of the Biographies of Eminent women (Lienü zhuan) alongside Kong Bo Ji and described as "deceitful and lustful", blamed for the succession crisis and accused of having caused the "disorder of five generations". One separate story in the Benevolence and Wise section is about an unnamed wife of Duke Ling of Wey, who is praised for her wisdom. The text doesn't establish whether this person is Nanzi.

Nanzi is portrayed by Zhou Xun in the 2010 biopic Confucius.
