= HK01 =

Hong Kong news website

- Website type: News
- Available in: Traditional Chinese
- Headquarters: 7/F, Tower 1, Ever Gain Plaza, 88 Container Port Road, Kwai Chung, Hong Kong
- Owners: HK01 Company Limited (香港01有限公司)
- Website: www.hk01.com
- Commercial: Yes
- Launched: 11 January 2016; 10 years ago

HK01 Weekly
- Type: Weekly
- Owner: Yu Pun-hoi
- Publisher: HK01 Company Limited
- Founded: 11 March 2016
- Ceased publication: 29 August 2022; 4 years ago
- Political alignment: Pro-Beijing; Pro-One Country, Two Systems
- Language: Traditional Chinese
- Website: Official website

HK01 (Chinese: 香港01) is a Hong Kong news outlet launched by Yu Pun-hoi, a former chairman of the Ming Pao. Operated as both a physical newspaper and a news website, it was established in June 2015 and managed by HK01 Company Limited. The website went live on 11 January 2016. It publishes a weekly paper every Friday, the first edition of which was released on 11 March 2016. As of 2019, The company has a staff of approximately 700.

== Circulation ==
As of October 2021, there were 1.7 million unique visitors viewing on HK01's websites and mobile applications on a daily basis, which made it the most influential news media in Hong Kong. Its mobile application was the most downloaded news app in both Apple App Store and Google Play Store in Hong Kong for more than 45 months since March 2018.

== Editorial stance ==
HK01 claims to be an advocacy media for social reform, which serves to integrate social reform in the role of media and inspire people about social issues. It claims to aim at a third path in the political fights between the pro-democracy and pro-establishment camps. Its founder Yu Pun-hoi is a pro-Beijing businessman, who write opinions for the 01 Opinion column. It was remarked by the Hong Kong Free Press in 2019 as a pro-Beijing media.

== Controversies ==
=== Coverage of Tiananmen Massacre anniversary ===
In 2017, HK01 was criticised by the Hong Kong Journalists Association (HKJA) for deleting an article covering release of new details of the Tiananmen Square massacre by the UK Government Archives shortly after the article's publication. Pressure from founder Yu Pun-hoi was suspected to have motivated the removal. The article was later republished with a rebuttal, saying that mistakes had been made when verifying the information contained in the original version and denying there had been self-censorship.

=== Stance on Taiwan and Hong Kong independence ===
In 2018, HK01 was again criticised by the HKJA over its tagging an article it published about Taiwanese independence with an anti-independence disclaimer. The company maintains a black-list containing pro-independence parties and groups in Hong Kong whose events it will not attend, with whom it will not form partnerships, and from whom it will accept advertising.

== See also ==
- Centrist camp
- Media in Hong Kong
- List of newspapers in Hong Kong
