= Gongbo Liao =

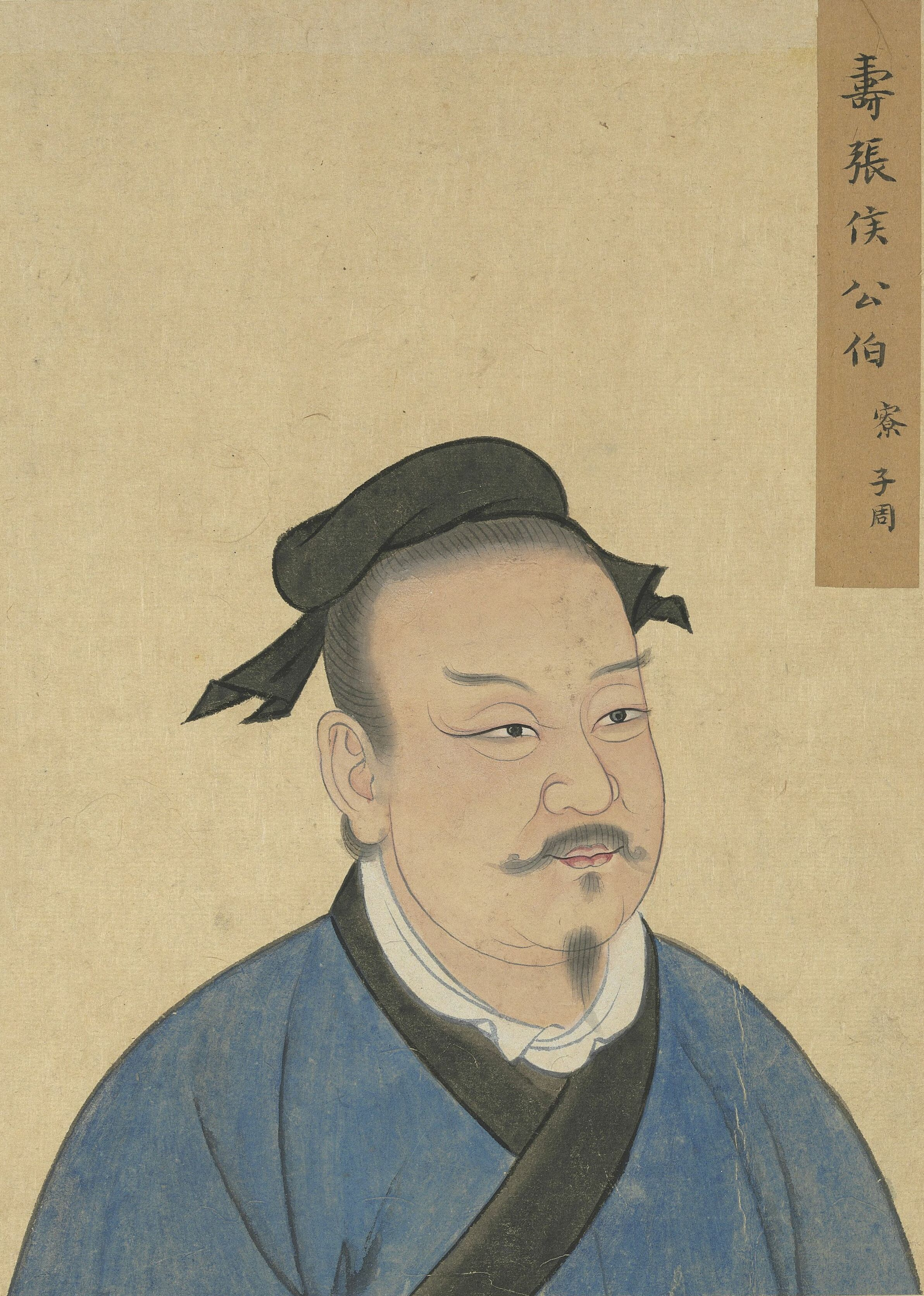
Yuan Dynasty depiction of Gongbo Liao

Gongbo Liao (Chinese: 公伯繚; Wade–Giles: Kung-po Liao), courtesy name Zizhou (Chinese: 子周; Wade–Giles: Tzu-chou), was a disciple of Confucius. He was born in the State of Lu, Confucius' native state. His years of birth and death are unknown.

The Analects (14.36) records that Gongbo Liao spoke ill of Zilu to Ji Kangzi, the head of the powerful Jisun family that dominated the politics of Lu at the time. Zilu was one of Confucius' closest disciples, who served as an officer in the house of Jisun. Zifu Jingbo (子服景伯), an official of Lu, reported it to Confucius, saying that Ji Kangzi was misled by Gongbo Liao's accusation. Confucius responded that whatever Gongbo Liao said, he had no power to change fate.

Han dynasty historian Sima Qian included Gongbo Liao in the "Biographies of the Disciples of Confucius" chapter of his Records of the Grand Historian, but many commentators consider Gongbo Liao unworthy of being considered a disciple of Confucius.

== Bibliography ==
- Han, Zhaoqi (2010). "Biographies of the Disciples of Confucius". Shiji 史记 (in Chinese). Beijing: Zhonghua Book Company. ISBN 978-7-101-07272-3.
- Huang, Chichung, ed. (1997). The Analects of Confucius. Oxford University Press. ISBN 978-0-19-506157-4.
- Legge, James (2009). The Confucian Analects, the Great Learning & the Doctrine of the Mean. Cosimo. ISBN 978-1-60520-644-8.
- Slingerland, Edward (2006). The Essential Analects: Selected Passages with Traditional Commentary. Hackett Publishing. ISBN 1-60384-346-9.
