= Yi Gong =

Yi Gong may refer to:

- Duke Yi (disambiguation)
- Sunjo of Joseon (1790–1834), Joseon king, personal name Yi Gong
- Gong Yi (born 1941), Chinese musician who plays the guqin (Gong is his surname)
