= Yao Yue =

Religious book

Yao Yue (堯曰) is one of the 20 books of the Analects of Confucius. Notably, it is the last book of the Analects. As the concluding book, Yaoyue is one of the hotly debated book of the Analects due to its distinct writing style and inconsistency with previous books.

== Name ==
The name "Yao Yue" refers to the mythological Chinese king Yao. "Yue", in Classical Chinese, means "to say". Therefore, the phrase "Yao Yue" can be expounded as "Yao said".

== Content ==
The book Yao Yue starts with a conversation initiated by Yao with his successor Shun. The conversation's subject was Yao's willing abdication and the appointment of Shun as his successor. The conversation constitutes half of the book Yao Yue while in the second half of the book, Confucius explained to his disciple Zizhang the ideal way of ruling a country.

The Analects come to a conclusion with Confucius' teaching on destiny (命), rites (禮), and the insight into words (知言).

== Interpretation ==
The singularity of the book Yaoyue did not go unnoticed throughout the history. For many Confucian scholars, the book seemed alien and out of place, according to Chin Annping.

Chin Annping explains in her notes on the Analects that, the 19th book of the Analects Zizhang achieved the conclusion of Confucius' teaching, so much so that the existence of Yaoyue is almost inexplicable.

However, both Chin Annping, a lecturer at Yale and Cheng Gang, a professor of Qinghua University agree that Yaoyue has its significance. The last paragraph of Yaoyue, according to Chin and Cheng, is a fit conclusion for the Analects.

In the last paragraph of Yaoyue, Confucius saith "A person will have no way to become a gentleman if he does not understand destiny". The word destiny (命) in this context refers to the insights into one's life acquired through the objective understanding of the universe's nature. With such understanding and insights people are allowed to avoid insisting on things that are not a part of their destiny, to escape from one's wishful thinking and risky behaviors according to Kong Anguo; a Han dynasty Confucian scholar, and Zhang Shi, a Song dynasty scholar. Xing Bing in his commentaries on the Analects also interpreted the paragraph similarly. Anguo and Bing both hold that the character 命 indicates "the limits of one's prosperity and destitution" (窮達之分).

Xing Bing went on to suggest that "destiny" is conferred from the heaven hence is not in the control of human will. What one should do, according to Bing, is to find the point of suitability in their actions.

In Qing dynasty, yet another attempt of interpreting the Analects was done by Liu Baonan in his work Lunyu Zhengyi. Liu Baonan cited the sayings of Dong Zhongshu who urged the distinction between humanity and animality. According to Dong Zhongshu, human beings possess the special and precious qualities that made them superior to animals, to realize our humanity, argued Liu Baonan, is to understand our destiny.

For Cheng Yi, the comprehension of destiny involves an unfaltering belief on one's own destiny. He criticizes purely speculative behaviors and attribute them to the ignorance of destiny.

Other key concepts in this book include: the five beautiful traits and four abhorrent ones (五美四惡), and "ruler is the one to blame" (罪在朕躬).
