= Yeren (Zhou dynasty) =

Zhou Chinese peasants and commoners

- Chinese: 野人
- Literal meaning: Wild People; Country Folk
Transcriptions
Standard Mandarin
- Hanyu Pinyin: yěrén

The yeren (Chinese: 野人; pinyin: Yé Rén; lit. 'field/rural people') were peasants and commoners under the ancient Zhou dynasty China (11th-3rd centuries BC). Living mostly in underdeveloped rural areas, they were considered uncivil people by the upper class guoren (國人; "city people"), who regarded themselves as cultured citizens living within the walls of larger urban settlements.

Zilu, one of Confucius's favorite disciples, was considered to be one and the Analects includes a passage giving the yeren primacy over the Zhou in having undergone the influence of "ritual and music". (Note: Chinese: 先進於禮樂，野人也。)

== See also ==
- Hua–Yi distinction
