= Duke Wu of Wey =

Duke Wu of Wey 卫武公

Ruler of Wey
- Reign: 812 - 758 BC
- Predecessor: Count Gong of Wey
- Successor: Duke Zhuang I of Wey
- Died: 758 BC
- Spouse: Unknown
Names
- Ancestral name: Ji (姬); Given name: He (和)
- House: House of Ji
- Father: Marquis Xi of Wey
- Mother: Unknown

Duke Wu of Wey (9th century BCE-?), also known as Ji He, was a Zhou dynasty feudal lord. He was the 11th ruler of Wey and the first Duke of Wey. The late Zhou dynasty historical record Guoyu claims that Duke Wu lived at least 95 years. However, no other sources support this claim.

== Life ==
The Records of the Grand Historian briefly noted that He succeeded his father Marquis Xi of Wey, the title was Marquis at the beginning of his rule. When Quanrong overthrown Zhou's rule in Haojing, King Ping of Zhou relocated the capital to Luoyi. Duke Wu aided Zhou by leading his army and confronting with Quanrong. The military merit of Marquis He was recognized by King Ping. The king elevated his rank of nobility to Duke accordingly. He died after 55 years of his rule. His son Duke Zhuang of Wey succeeded him.

Duke Wu's shrine was located in Qi county of Henan Province where the shrine of Shu Feng of Kang can also be found.

== Identification with He, Earl of Gong ==
He, Earl of Gong was a figure mentioned by numerous inscriptions and in the Chinese classics. For many years, whether he was a person or literary device was poorly understood. Contemporary Chinese historian Gu Jiegang speculated that the Duke Wu of Wey was the one who exiled King Li of Zhou in 841 BCE, and because Duke Wu's name was also He, they posited that the two were the same person. However, with excavated texts revealing further detail on the individual, and chronological issues, this appears to be a coincidence, and the theory has thus been largely debunked.

== In literature ==
In the earliest collection of Chinese poetry, Shih-ching, an ode dedicated to Duke Wu can be found. In the Guó fēng part of Shih Ching, the ode Qi Ao (淇奧) praised Duke Wu for his tolerance of different opinions, his unfaltering desire to learn and his refraining from the abuse of power. In the comment of this ode, the author, like Gu Jiegang, also claimed that Duke Wu was in charge of Zhou dynasty's court at a certain point of time.

This ode was so well known that one of the phrase rú qiē rú cuō, rú zhuó rú mó (如切如磋，如琢如磨) entered into the common lexicon of Mandarin Chinese. In Mandarin, qiē cuō (切磋) means "to practice", and zhuó mó (琢磨) means "to contemplate".

If Shih Ching and Gu Jiegang were both true in their claim, the word "Republic/Republican" in Mandarin, Japanese, Korean and Vietnamese "共和" also traces its origin to Duke Wu of Wey.

Additionally, the Minor court Hymns of Shih Ching collected one of Duke Wu's own work. Duke Wu composed the hymn of Bin Zhi Chuyan in order to satirize King You of Zhou's decadent way of life. In the Major court hymns, the hymn of Yi (抑, Refrain), was Duke Wu's production as well. In Yi, he solicited King Ping of Zhou for his prudence in ruling a country.
