= Ming Pao Daily News (Canada) =

Chinese language daily newspaper in Ontario, Canada

Ming Pao Daily News, Canada Edition
- Type: Daily newspaper, Magazine
- Format: Broadsheet
- Owner: Media Chinese International
- Founded: 1993
- Ceased publication: January 18, 2026
- Political alignment: Center
- Language: Traditional Chinese
- Headquarters: 1355 Huntingwood Drive, Toronto, Ontario
- Circulation: 158,000
- Website: www.mingpaocanada.com

Ming Pao Daily News (Chinese: 明報; pinyin: Míng Bào), or Ming Pao for short, was a Chinese language newspaper in Canada owned by the Ming Pao Group of Hong Kong.

Ming Pao in Canada had two editions. The Eastern edition (加東版; Jiā dōng bǎn) published in Toronto, Ontario was launched in May 1993 by then Chairman P.H. Yu, and competed in the local Chinese community with Sing Tao Daily and World Journal. The Toronto editorial offices are located in Agincourt. Shortly after in October 1993, the Western edition (加西版; Jiā xī bǎn) was launched in Vancouver, British Columbia.

With rival papers having ceased print editions in Canada (Sing Tao Daily shifted online in 2022 and World Journal shuttered in 2016). Ming Pao was the last paid Chinese-language newspaper that published daily in the country.

The paper published 7 days a week in broadsheet format. News coverage include Canadian news (including national, provincial, city and community pages), international news, Hong Kong news, mainland China and Taiwan news, plus lifestyle, entertainment, and sports sections.

On January 12, 2026, it was announced that due to financial difficulties the Richmond, British Columbia and Toronto branches of the paper would publish their final edition January 17, 2026, with all 60 staff terminated effective January 31, 2026.

== Magazines ==
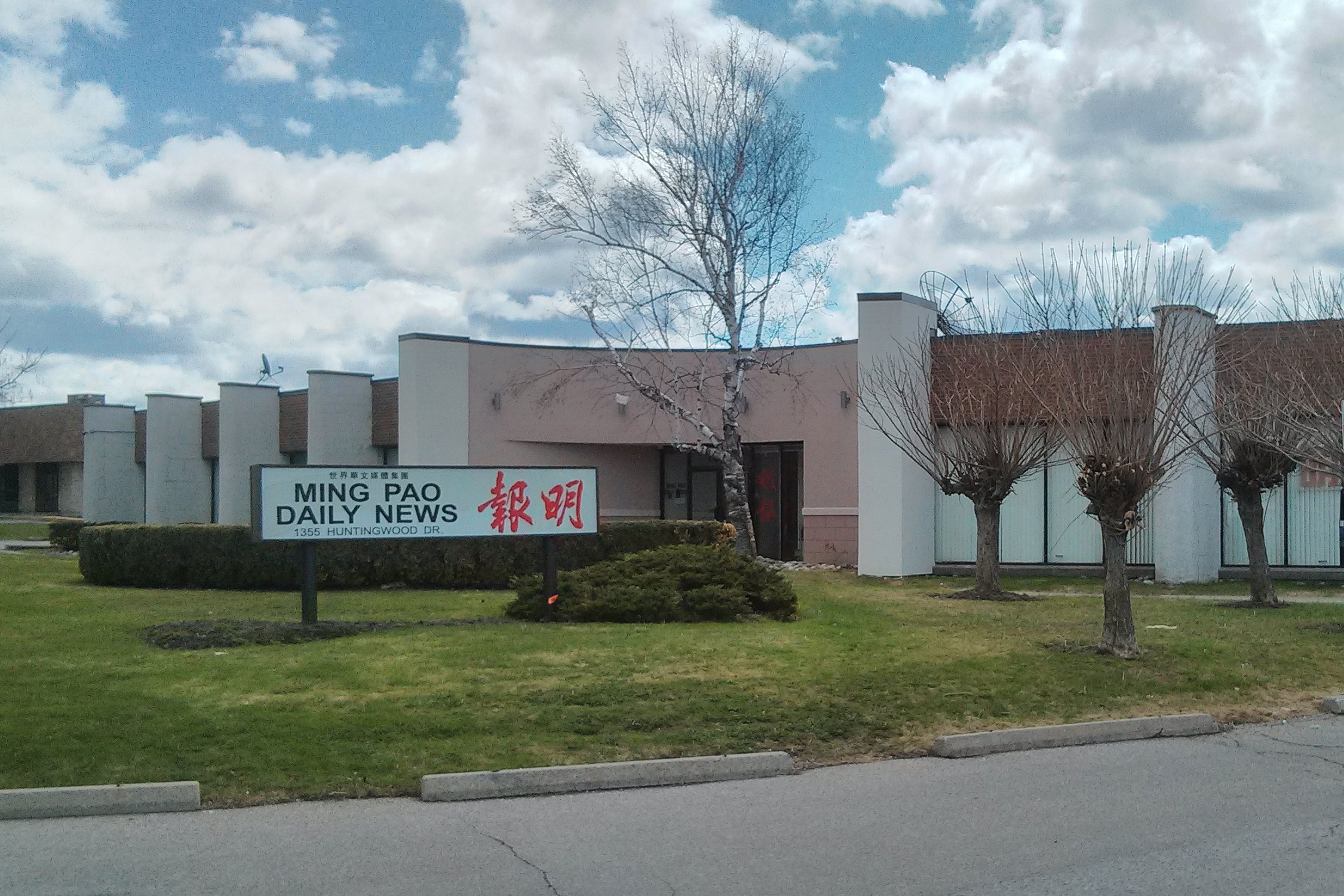
Head office of Ming Pao Daily News in Scarborough, Ontario.

From 1993-2019, the Canada Eastern edition of Ming Pao publishes several weekly magazines. Unlike the situation in Hong Kong where the magazines are sold as separate publications, these were more properly called supplements that come free with the paper. The pages inside the magazines were also printed on newsprint instead of glossy paper.

Since 2019, in response to increased demands, Ming Pao gradually revamped its business model and all magazines were sold individually. Free copies of Ming Pao's daily newspaper were offered as incentive with a subscription.

The magazines that came with the Canada Eastern edition were:

- Wednesday —Ming Pao Gourmet Supplement (樂在明廚), a tabloid-sized food magazine.
- Thursday — Property Golden Pages (地產金頁), a tabloid-format publication containing mostly editorial content on the real estate market and home improvement with some property listings and other data.
- Friday — Healthy Living (健康生活), a tabloid-sized magazine that discusses trendy health and lifestyle issues.
- Saturday — Saturday Magazine (星期六周刊), a lifestyle-and-news magazine with substantial original local content.
- Sunday — Ming Pao Weekly (明報加東周刊), a tabloid-sized entertainment magazine with content covering the latest gossips in the Hong Kong and Canadian entertainment industries.
- Sunday — Zhōnghuá Tànsuǒ (中華探索, "Exploring China"), a magazine containing political criticism from Hong Kong's Ming Pao Magazine and Yazhou Zhoukan.

From time to time, special supplements were also published.
