= Yuan Xian =

Disciple of Confucius

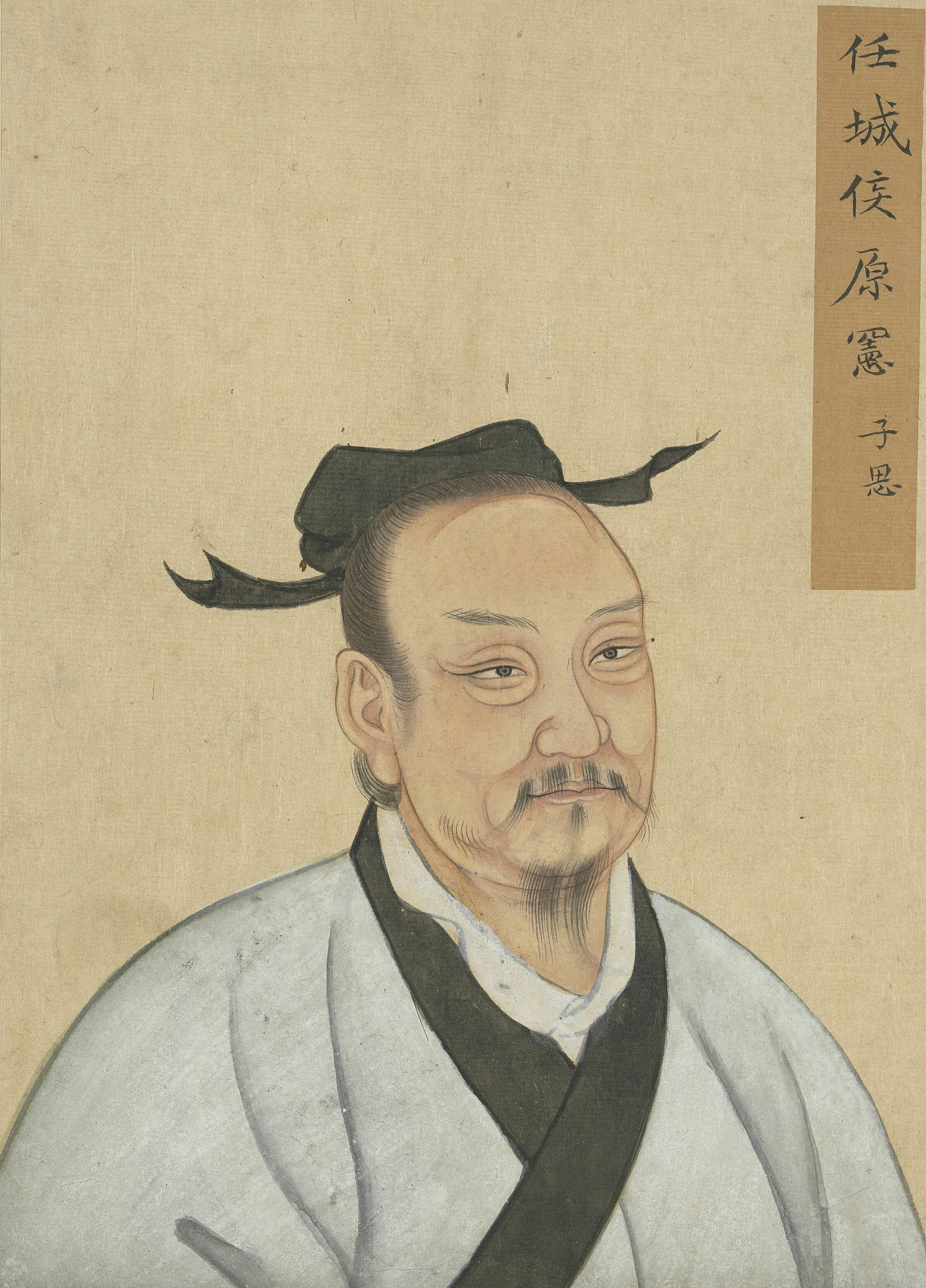
- Traditional Chinese: 原憲
- Simplified Chinese: 原宪
Transcriptions
Standard Mandarin
- Hanyu Pinyin: Yuán Xiàn
- Wade–Giles: Yüan Hsien

Zisi
- Chinese: 子思
Transcriptions
Standard Mandarin
- Hanyu Pinyin: Zǐsī
- Wade–Giles: Tzu-ssu

Yuan Si
- Chinese: 原思
Transcriptions
Standard Mandarin
- Hanyu Pinyin: Yuán Sī
- Wade–Giles: Yüan Ssu

Yuan Xian (born 515 BC), courtesy name Zisi or Yuan Si, was a Chinese philosopher who was a major disciple of Confucius. Classic Chinese sources stated he was modest and incorruptible, and adhered strictly to the teachings of Confucius despite living in abject poverty.

== Life ==
Yuan Xian was born in 515 BC, 36 years younger than Confucius. His origin is uncertain. The Kongzi Jiayu says he was a native of the State of Song, but according to Han dynasty Confucianist Zheng Xuan, he was from the State of Lu.

Yuan Xian was Confucius' chief household officer when Confucius served as Minister of Justice of Lu. After the death of his master, Yuan Xian moved to the State of Wey, where he lived in obscurity and poverty.

The Zhuangzi and the Records of the Grand Historian (Shiji) both record a conversation between Yuan Xian and Duanmu Ci (Zigong), another well-known disciple of Confucius. Zigong, who served as a high official and was a wealthy businessman, went to visit Yuan Xian's village in his quadriga. According to these texts, Yuan lived in a tiny hut with a thatched roof, reached via alleys too narrow for a chariot. Zigong expressed pity and shame at Yuan's distress, but Yuan Xian countered that he was able to put the Tao into practice, and lived a life of poverty but not of distress. The chronicles stated that for the rest of his life, Zigong felt ashamed of his own words.

== Legacy ==
In Confucian temples, Yuan Xian's spirit tablet is placed in the outer court, beyond those of the Four Assessors and Twelve Wise Ones.

During the Tang dynasty, Emperor Xuanzong posthumously awarded Yuan Xian the nobility title of Count of Yuan (原伯). During the Song dynasty, he was further awarded the title of Marquis of Rencheng (任城侯).
