= Duke Ling of Wey =

Duke of Chinese state of Wey from c.534 to 493 BC

Duke Ling of Wey 衛靈公
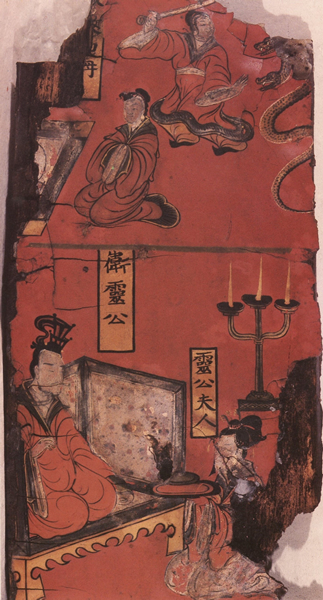
- Duke Ling of Wey (left at the bottom) with his wife.

Duke of Wey
- Reign: c. 534 - 493 BC
- Predecessor: Duke Xiang
- Successor: Duke Chu
- Died: 493 BC
- Spouse: Lady Nanzi (南子)
- Issue: Duke Zhuang of Wey (Kuai Kui); Kong Bo Ji
Names
- ancestral name Jī (姬) clan name Wèi (衛); Given name Yuán (元)
Posthumous name
- Duke Ling (靈公)
- Father: Duke Xiang of Wey
- Mother: Chou E (婤姶), concubine of Duke Xiang of Wey

Duke Ling of Wey (衛靈公) (ruled c. 534 — 493 BC) was the 28th ruler of the ancient Chinese state of Wey, the son of Duke Xiang of Wey. Chapter 15 of the Analects of Confucius is named after him. His given name was Yuan (元).

== Family ==
Duke Ling was born to Duke Xiang and the concubine Chou E (婤姶). Duke Ling's wife was Lady Nanzi (南子), whilst his son was Prince Kuaikui (蒯聵). Duke Ling was succeeded by his grandson Duke Chu, son of Kuaikui.

== Life ==
When Duke Xiang of Wey died, he did not specify an heir apparent. Lord Kong Chengzi consulted the oracles of I Ching and Shu Feng of Kang's mandate in order to choose an heir. The oracles and the spirit of Shu Feng favoured prince Yuan, the second son of Duke Xiang. According to the religious convention, Kong Chengzi therefore decided to enthrone prince Yuan as the next Duke of Wey. In 535 BCE, Yuan succeeded the title of duke (Gong).

In 522 BCE Duke Ling was forced to flee to the city of Siniao due to a sudden rebellion of his retainers Qi Bao, Beigong Xi, and Chu Shipu. Qi Bao's rebellion was caused by Duke Ling's elder brother Zhi Gongmeng (公孟絷), who abused his power as a prince. Zhi Gongmeng deprived Qi Bao of his land and gave him orders arrogantly, thus humiliating Qi Bao. While in Siniao, Duke Ling received an envoy from the state of Qi. Upon receiving the envoy, Duke Ling admitted that he was not an apt ruler. Later, Qi Bao was assassinated by Beigong Xi's own retainer, who did not know that his own lord was allied with Qi Bao. After the death of Qi Bao, Duke Ling returned to Diqiu, the capital city of Wey. He did not punish Beigong Xi for plotting against him.

Duke Ling's elder son, Prince Kuaikui, attempted to murder his mother, Lady Nanzi. The plan was not successful, and Kuaikui fled to Song and later to Jin; Kuaikui's son Zhe (輒) remained in Wey.

In 493 BCE Duke Ling died after 42 years on the throne. His widow Lady Nanzi wanted to enthrone Prince Ying (公子郢), but Ying refused the proposition, instead recommending his brother Kuaikui's son Zhe as the heir apparent. Consequently, Zhe succeeded Duke Ling and was known as Duke Chu of Wey (衛出公).

== Duke Ling and Mizi Xia ==
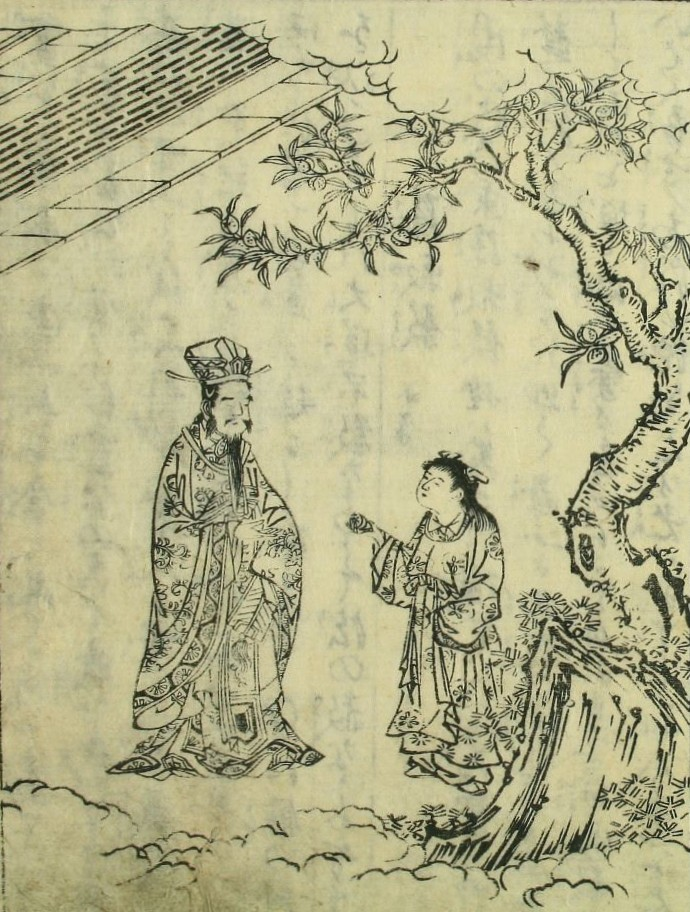
llustration of Mizi Xia (right) offering a bitten peach to Duke Ling of Wey, from Ehon kojidan (1714) by Tachibana Morikuni

Duke Ling was one of the most famous representatives of the homosexual tradition in China, as portrayed in the philosophic work Han Feizi by Han Fei. In the chapter Shuonan (說難), Duke Ling favours a courtier named Mizi Xia (彌子瑕), who he allows to use the ducal carriage without permission, and who he admires for handing over the remainder of an especially delicious peach. Han Fei records that once Mizi Xia's looks faded, however, the Duke turned against his former lover, accusing him of stealing the carriage and of degrading the Duke by giving him a half-eaten peach. This story was so widespread amongst the literati of China that the phrase "the bitten peach" (餘桃) became a byword for homosexuality.

== In media ==
Duke Ling was played by Bi Yanjun in the biographical fantasy adventure drama film Confucius (2010).
