= Duke Yi =

Duke Yi or Yi Gong may refer to the following ancient Chinese rulers:

- Duke Yǐ of Qi (齊乙公): 10th-century BC ruler of the state of Qi
- Duke Yì of Qi (齊懿公): 7th-century BC ruler of the state of Qi
- Duke Yi of Lu
- Duke Yi of Chen
- Duke Yi of Wey
