= Kong Wenzi =

Kong Wenzi (孔文子) or Kong Yu (孔圉) was a statesman in the State of Wei during the 5th century BC.

== Life ==
Kong Wenzi was named Kong Yu while he was alive.

While he served as a minister, a person in the royal family of Wei named Tai Shuji (太叔疾) had married the daughter of Prince Zichao (子朝) of the State of Song. He also married her younger sister. Zichao fled the country and Kong Yu persuaded Tai Shuji to divorce and marry his own daughter Kong Ji (孔姞). Tai Shuji, however, continued to engage in an affair with the younger sister while he was married to Kong Yu's daughter. When Kong Yu heard about this, he resolved to take military action against the State of Song. However, he had a meeting with Confucius at which Confucius persuaded him to not go to war. Kong Yu brought his daughter back to the State of Wei and arranged for her to marry Tai Shuji's brother Tai Shuyi (太叔遗), whom Kong Yu had helped to become the new monarch of the State of Wei.

After he died, Kong Yu was given the title of 'Wen' (文) which was given to a very learned person. In the Analects, there is a part where Zigong asked Confucius about why Kong Wenzi received this title. Confucius replied: "He was of an active nature and yet fond of learning, and he was not ashamed to ask and learn of his inferiors!—On these grounds he has been styled Wen".
