= Xue Er =

First book of the Analects of Confucius

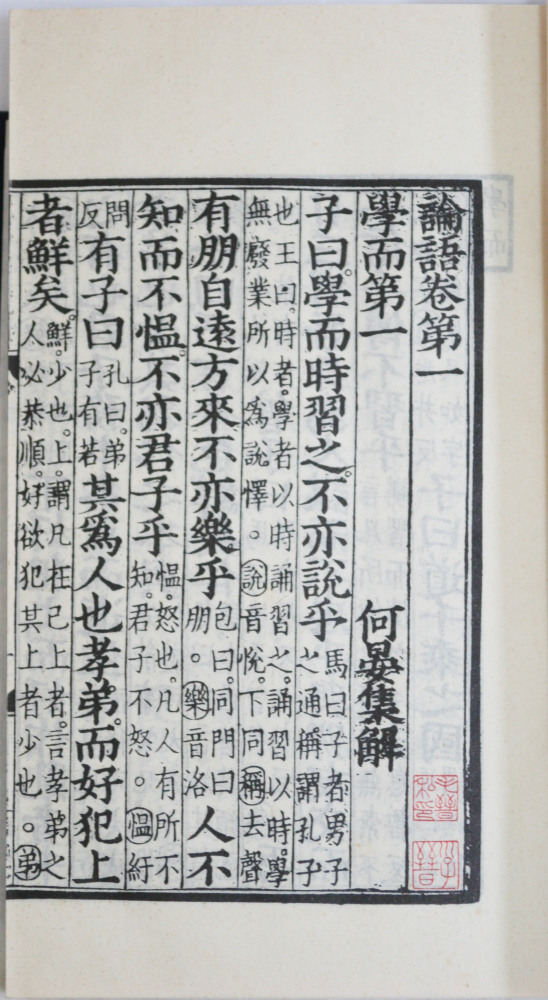
The Book Xue Er with commentaries by He Yan

Xué Ér (學而) is the first book of the Analects of Confucius. According to Zhu Xi, a Confucian philosopher in the 12th century, the book Xue Er is the base of moral improvement because it touches upon the basic principles of being a "gentleman" (jūnzǐ, 君子).

== Name ==
Xué (學) Ér (而) consist of two Chinese characters. The first character, Xué, means "to learn" as a verb or "the research of something" as a noun. The following character, Ér, is a conjunction between two actions.

The title of a book in the Analects is usually related to its first phrase. The book Xué Ér's initial sentence in Classical Chinese starts with "Xué Ér":

子曰：「學而時習之，不亦說乎？」

Zǐ yuē: "Xué ér shí xí zhī, bù yì yuè hū?"

The Master said, "Is it not pleasant to learn with a constant perseverance and application?

This translation uses only one verb "to learn", other versions translate the whole phrase, "Is it not a pleasure to learn 學 (xué), and, when it is timely, to practice 習 (xí) what you have learned?

== Content ==
Xing Bing's commentary of the Analects Lunyu Zhengyi (論語正義) listed several key words of the book Xué Ér. The key words include: Gentleman (君子), filial piety (孝弟), humaneness (仁人), doing one's best (忠), trust (信), the foundation of a nation (道國之法) and the principles of an appropriate friendship (主友之規).

In the book, Confucius opted for hospitality towards strangers and tolerance of ignorance. Confucius also emphasized on the importance of self introspection (through examples from his disciple Zengzi and his own sayings).

=== Usage of 說 ===
In the first sentence of Xue Er, the character 說 is used.

說 yuè is an obsolete form of 悅 as stated in the Collected Notes on Chapters and Sentences of the Four Books 四書章句集注,

子曰：「學而時習之，不亦說乎？」說、悅同。

Zǐ yuē: "Xué ér shí xí zhī, bù yì yuè hū?" Shuō, yuè tóng.

The Master said, "Is it not pleasant to learn with a constant perseverance and application? Shuō, identical to yuè.

This is also noted by Xing Bing who wrote,

正義曰：《爾雅·釋詁》：「說，樂也。」《皇》本凡「說」皆作「悅」。《說文》有「說」無「悅」，「悅」是俗體。

Zhèngyì said: In the Erya: Shigu: states that "說 is 樂 (to be joyful)". In the original outline of 皇: states that when 說 appears, its meaning is 悅 (to be pleased). In the Shuowen, it has 說, but not 悅, 悅 is the common form.
