= Jiao, Lord of Wey =

Ruler of the Chinese state of Wey from 241 to 209 BC

Jiao 角

Lord of Wey
- Reign: 241-209 BC
- Predecessor: Lord Yuan
- Successor: state annexed by Qin dynasty
Names
- ancestral name Jī (姬) clan name Zǐnán (子南); Given name Jiǎo (角)

Jiao, Lord of Wey (Chinese: 卫君角), also known as Wei Jiao (卫角), was a Qin dynasty feudal lord. He was the 44th and the last ruler of the state of Wey. After his death, he did not receive a posthumous name; Jiao was his given name.

== Life ==
Jiao was the heir of Lord Yuan of Wey, but his relationship with Lord Yuan is not clear. According to the Records of the Grand Historian, he became the lord of Wey nine years before Qin's unification of China. If the records are correct, his year of accession was 230 BCE, but according to Japanese historian Takao Hirase, Jiao's year of accession was 241 BCE instead of 230 BCE. In the first year of his rule, he relocated the state of Wey and its people to Yewang.

After Qin's unification, Wey was the only remaining state out of all the Chinese states established according to the mandate of the Zhou dynasty king other than Qin. For reasons unknown, Qin Shi Huang did not remove Jiao from his throne, but Emperor Qin Er Shi deposed Jiao and made him a commoner in 209 BCE. The state of Wey, established in 1040 BCE, was the longest-lasting state from the Zhou dynasty.
