= Duowei News =

Chinese language news website based in New York City

- Type: News website
- Industry: Media
- Founded: 11 January 1999
- Founder: Ho Pin
- Defunct: 26 April 2022
- Headquarters: Beijing, People's Republic of China
- Owner: Yu Pun-hoi
- Parent: Sino-I Technology Limited
- Website: www.dwnews.com (defunct)

Duowei News (traditional Chinese: 多維新聞; simplified Chinese: 多维新闻; pinyin: Duōwéi xīnwén; lit. 'multidimensional news'), originally named Chinese News Net, was a Chinese language news website established in 1999 based in New York City, United States. The website was also known in English as Multidimensional News, which is the literal translation of its Chinese name. It specialized in Chinese political news.

Duowei News was blocked in mainland China. In 2013, Jason Q. Ng of China Digital Times and Citizen Lab considered the outlet to be critical of mainland China and the PRC government's policies. According to Radio France Internationale in 2018, the site has been accused of having a pro-Beijing view point and promoting Chinese Communist Party propaganda. It was viewed as one of the independent Chinese language media outlets in the United States that later were taken over by pro-Beijing businessmen.

== History ==
Duowei News, whose original domain name was chinesenewsnet.com, was founded by Ho Pin (何频) on 11 January 1999, who used to work for a Chinese state-run newspaper but left due to negative feelings towards the 1989 Tiananmen Square protests and massacre.

On June 27, 2004, Duowei's new domain name, dwnews.com, was created. Duowei continued to be an online independent Chinese-language media website for years until 2009 when the website was sold to the Hong Kong media mogul Yu Pun-hoi who was considered to be pro-Beijing.

Ho Pin later published Mingjing News. Duowei had a news bureau in Beijing. According to a Hoover Institution report, after the 2009 sale, Duowei moved its headquarters to Beijing.

Duowei News correctly predicted the lineups of the 16th and 17th National Congress of the Chinese Communist Party in 2002 and 2007 respectively.

Duowei News closed on 26 April 2022.
