= Duke Chu of Wey =

5th-century BC ruler of the Chinese state of Wey

Duke Chu of Wey 衛出公

Duke of Wey (first reign)
- Reign: 493-481 BC
- Predecessor: Duke Ling
- Successor: Duke Zhuang II

Duke of Wey (second reign)
- Reign: 477-470 BC
- Predecessor: Qi
- Successor: Duke Dao
Names
- ancestral name Jī (姬) clan name Wèi (衛); Given name Zhé (輒)
Posthumous name
- Duke Chu (出公)
- Father: Duke Zhuang II of Wey

Duke Chu of Wey (Chinese: 衛出公, died c. 469 BC) was 29th ruler of the ancient Chinese state of Wey. He ruled the duchy twice: the first time between 493 BC and 481 BC, the second time between 477 BC and 470 BC. His given name was Zhé (輒).

Zhé was the son of Kuǎikùi, whom was the heir apparent to the throne. Kuǎikùi was at odds with the Duchess Nan Zi (南子) and fled to Jin, but Zhé stayed in Wey.

In 493 BC, Duke Ling of Wey died. Though Duchess Nanzi (南子) wanted to enthrone her son Prince Yǐng (公子郢), but Yǐng refused the proposition. Instead, Yǐng recommended Zhé as the successor. Consequently, Zhé succeeded Duke Ling and was known as Duke Chu of Wey. Supported by Jin, his father Kuǎikùi attempted a comeback. However, in the same year, with the help of Qi, Duke Chu laid siege to his father. Since then, the father and son became enemies.

Confucius was at least a partial witness to the ensuing family melodrama, it broke his heart. According to the Analects, Confucius hinted that he would support neither Duke Chu nor Kuǎikùi. In another dialogue with Zhong You, Confucius said if he was a governor of Wey, he would consider "rectifying names" (正名) as the first thing to be done.

Duke Chu was deposed by his father in 480 BC, the latter was known as Duke Zhuang II of Wey. He fled to Lu, later, he returned with the armed assistance of Qi and restored in 477 BC.

Duke Chu was overthrown by his uncle Qián in 470 BC, the latter was known as Duke Dao of Wey. He fled to Song then to Yue to seek for help. In the next year, he returned with the joint expedition of Yue, Lu and Song, however, he dared not enter the capital. He died in Yue.
