= E. Bruce Brooks =

American sinologist (1936–2026)

- Born: June 23, 1936; Akron, Ohio, U.S.
- Died: May 26, 2026 (aged 89)
- Education: Oberlin Conservatory; University of Washington
- Scientific career
- Fields: Sinology

E. Bruce Brooks (June 23, 1936 – May 26, 2026) was an American sinologist. He was a research professor of Chinese at the University of Massachusetts, Amherst. He is known for his revisionist textual studies and translations of pre-Qin philosophical texts, many in collaboration with his wife, A. Taeko Brooks.

The Original Analects (1991) a critical translation of the Analects, the collection of sayings attributed to Confucius, argued that the received text was not written by Confucius himself or by any one later person, but was an "accretion" of oral traditions and written fragments put together by various hands and edited as late as the Han dynasty. One reviewer wrote that the book changed the way that scholars approached these early texts, and was "extraordinary book in many ways," clearly "required reading for anyone concerned with early Confucian thought."

Brooks died on May 26, 2026, at the age of 89.

== Education and career ==
Brooks took a Bachelor's degree from the Oberlin Conservatory of Music in 1958 and a PhD from the University of Washington, Seattle in 1968.

== Scholarly activities ==
=== The Warring States Project ===
Brooks announced the formation of the Warring States Project, using a form of romanization that he adopted:

The end of feudal Jou (Zhou) in 0771, the emergence of a multistate system in Spring and Autumn (08c-06c), and the founding of a unified Chinese Empire in 0221, are one of the great events in world history. The Warring States Project is systematically studying the source texts, with methods standard in all the humanistic sciences. The result is a coherent and historically plausible account of China's formative centuries, revealing in greater detail than before the intellectual development leading up to the Empire.

The Project's publications fall into three areas: Sinology, Biblical and similar investigations, and poetry, whether in Chinese, Biblical Hebrew, or Homeric Greek.

=== The Original Analects ===
Brooks and his wife, A. Taeko Brooks, a Research Associate of the Project, developed a revisionist argument over the Confucian text known in English as The Analects, traditionally attributed to Confucius, who lived in the 5th century BCE. The major publication of this project was The Original Analects, published by Columbia University Press in 1998. The Preface pointed out that the text of the Analects that was accepted in imperial China could not be traced directly to Confucius himself but was pieced together several hundred years after his death. They subjected this traditional text to archeological and stylistic tests and concluded that large parts of it were not from Confucius himself. On the other hand, they reasoned that in a society where important texts, traditions, and historical records were transmitted orally, it was also not reasonable to dismiss texts simply because they dated from later times; the later might well contain valid information about events of several hundred years earlier. They further held that the text was not composed by a single person or at a single time, but was an "accretion."

The Original Analects was widely reviewed. The editors of Sino-Platonic Papers wrote that The Original Analects is "one of the most important Sinological works, not only of the twentieth century, but of all time." After the work of "the great Bernhard Karlgren" on historical phonology, they explain, "nobody could ever again look upon the sounds of Middle Sinitic and Old Sinitic as impenetrable and unknowable." Likewise, after Bruce Brooks and A. Taeko Brooks "no one will ever again be able to look at so-called "pre-Ch'in (or pre-Han) texts" as monolithic and unproblematic." A revolutionary work will be questioned and not all findings will find acceptance, but "even if the Brookses may be shown to have erred in certain details, their overall conclusions about the Analects will stand the test of time and, in any event, have already shaken Chinese Studies to the core.

Edward Slingerland wrote that it was an "extraordinary book in many ways," clearly "required reading for anyone concerned with early Confucian thought." He added, however, that it "fails to substantiate most of its more radical claims," and finds its translations "awkward yet etymologically precise...." Slingerland particularly objected to the discounting philosophical views that might account for how the text was developed, preferring political explanations. He praised the richness of their commentaries, making it an "invaluable sourcebook for students of the text." Brooks' reply was to offer further arguments and archeological evidence.

Robert Eno wrote that The Original Analects is an "impressive reinterpretation of the structure and history" of the Lunyu, and that he was a proponent of the accretion theory, but that the book did not define the term "accretion" or describe the range of "textual phenomena" and "analytic tactics" entailed in such a theory.

John Makeham published an extensive review in China Review International

=== The Alpha Project ===
Brooks participates in the Alpha Project, which argues that "Another world event is the emergence of Christianity out of Judaism in the 1st century. Approached with the same standard methods, the source texts reveal a situation which has long been suspected: the existence of a pre-Pauline form of Christianity which we call Alpha. Project research is further elucidating this earliest Christianity."

=== Sinologica ===
The Warring States Projects maintains a website with subpages.

==== Summary ====
The Summary page contains Notes on Method, Texts, of The Major Pre-Imperial Texts.

==== Sinological Profiles ====
Sinological Profiles, published online in the Reference Section of the Warring States Project, contains encyclopedia-length essays on some three dozen sinologists. They have "not been systematically chosen, but have chosen themselves through personal contact or through reading".

- Vasili Alexeev
- Étienne Balázs
- Derk Bodde
- Michael Boym
- August Conrady
- J J L Duyvendak
- Wolfram Eberhard
- Eduard Erkes
- Alfred Forke
- Otto Franke
- Georg von der Gabelentz
- J J M de Groot
- Erich Haenisch
- Tom Kaasa
- Bernhard Karlgren
- George Kennedy
- Albert Terrien de Lacouperie
- Berthold Laufer
- Lin Yutang
- Henri Maspero
- R H Mathews
- Paul Pelliot
- August Pfizmeier
- Timoteus Pokora
- Erwin Reifler
- Bruno Schindler
- Gustaaf Schlegel
- Iulian Shchutskii
- Nancy Lee Swann
- Tswei Shu
- Giuseppe Tucci
- Wang Gwo-wei
- Arthur Waley
- Hellmut WIlhelm
- Erwin von Zach

== Selected publications ==
- Brooks, E. Bruce (1968). Chinese Aria Studies.
- —— (1975). "(Review Article) Journey toward the West: An Asian Prosodic Embassy in the Year 1972". Harvard Journal of Asiatic Studies. 35: 221–274. doi:10.2307/2718795. JSTOR 2718795. Review article of W.K. Wimsatt, ed., Versification: The Major Language Types (New York: New York University Press,1972).
- ——; with Brooks, A. Taeko (1976). Chinese Character Frequency Lists. Northampton, Mass.: SinFac Minor.
- —— (1994). The Present State and Future Prospects of Pre-Hã n Text Studies: A Review of Michael Loewe (Ed), Early Chinese Texts (1993): From Sino-Platonic Papers #46 (July, 1994). Northampton, MA: E.B. Brooks.
- ——; with Brooks, A. Taeko (1998). The Original Analects: Sayings of Confucius and His Successors. New York: Columbia University Press. ISBN 0231104308.
- —— (1999). Alexandrian Motifs in Chinese Texts. Philadelphia, PA, USA: Dept. of Asian and Middle Eastern Studies, University of Pennsylvania.
- —— (2002). "Word Philology and Text Philology in Analects 9:1". Confucius and the Analects: 163–215.
- —— (2003). Philology in an Old Key: Lord Shang Revisited.
- ——; with Brooks, A. Taeko (2011). The Emergence of China: From Confucius to the Empire. Amherst, Mass.; London: Warring States Project; Eurospan [distributor]. ISBN 9781936166350.

== References and further reading ==
- Allen, Charlotte (1999). "Confucius and the Scholars". Atlantic Online.
- Brooks, E. Bruce Brooks A. Taeko Wallacker Benjamin E. (1999). "Reviews of Books - the Original Analects: Sayings of Confucius and His Successors". Journal of Asian History. 33 (1): 81.
- Eno, Robert (2018). "The Lunyu as an Accretion Text". In Hunter, Michael; Kern, Marti (eds.). Confucius and the Analects Revisited. Leiden, The Netherlands: Brill. doi:10.1163/9789004382947_004.
- Wittern, Christian; App, Urs; Mair, Victor (January 1999), "Review" (PDF), Sino-Platonic Papers, VII
- Slingerland, Edward (2000), "Why Philosophy Is Not "Extra" in Understanding the Analects", Philosophy East and West, 50 (1): 137–41, JSTOR 1400076
