= Duke Yi of Wey =

Ruler of Wey, China from 668 to 660 BCE

Duke Yi of Wey 衛懿公
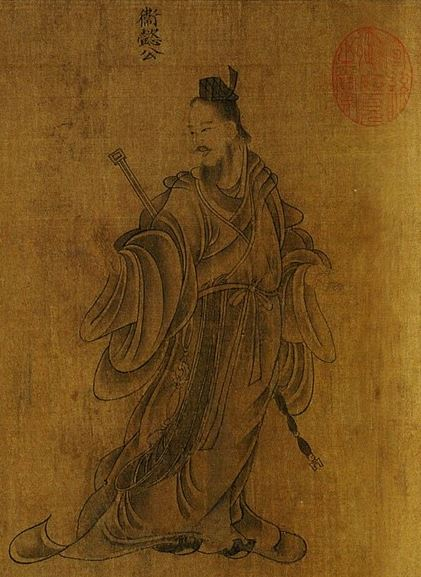
- Painting of Duke Yi. Song dynasty copy of an original 4th century painting by Gu Kaizhi.

Ruler of Wey
- Reign: 668 - 660 BC
- Predecessor: Qianmou
- Successor: Duke Dai
- Born: Chi (赤)
- Died: 660 BC
Posthumous name
- Yi (懿)
- Father: Duke Hui of Wey

Duke Yi of Wey (Chinese: 衛懿公; pinyin: Wèi Yì Gōng, died 660 BC), given name Chi (赤), was a Zhou dynasty feudal lord and the 18th ruler of Wey. He was best known for his absurd lifestyle which led to a temporary fall of his state and to his death.

== Life ==
Chi was the son of Duke Hui of Wey. He succeeded his father in the year of 668 BCE. The Records of the Grand Historian and Zuo Zhuan recorded that Duke Yi was an enthusiast of crane breeding. He was so fond of this type of bird that when Di people invaded his country, he sent off cranes to fight on the battlefield in the hope of a victory over the invaders. He led the army himself and fought the Di people in the battle of Yingze. In the end, the duke was defeated.

In the winter of 660 BCE, Di people destroyed the defense of Wey army and ruined the city of Chaoge; today's Qi county of Henan Province. Duke Yi was killed.

After Duke Yi's death, Duke Huan of Qi built a city in Chuqiu for Duke Yi's successor Duke Dai. The state's lifespan was prolonged thanks to Duke Huan.

His death marked the end of Wey's existence in Chaoge, the city which Shu Feng of Kang received from his brother Duke Zhou.

According to Lushi Chunqiu, Duke Yi's body was entirely cannibalized by the Di invaders except for his liver, which was retrieved by Duke Huan and transplanted to Duke Yi's loyal general Hong Yan, who committed suicide to allow Duke Yi's remaining organ a proper burial.
