= Duke Zhuang II of Wey =

Ruler of Wey, China from 480 to 478 BC

Duke Zhuang II of Wey 衛後莊公

Duke of Wey
- Reign: 480-478 BC
- Predecessor: Duke Chu
- Successor: Banshi
- Issue: Duke Chu of Wey; Crown Prince Jí; Prince Qīng
Names
- ancestral name Jī (姬) clan name Wèi (衛); Given name Kuǎikùi (蒯聵)
Posthumous name
- Duke Zhuang (莊公)
- Father: Duke Ling of Wey

Duke Zhuang of Wey (Chinese: 衛莊公, died 478 BC) was a ruler of the Chinese state of Wey. He ruled the duchy between 480 BC until his death in 478 BC. His given name was Kuǎikùi (蒯聵).

== Biography ==
Kuaikui was the eldest son of Duke Ling of Wey. He was appointed the heir apparent to the throne, although he was born to a concubine. He was at odds with his Di mother Duchess Nan Zi (南子). Later, he attempted to murder Nan Zi. The retainer Kuaikui tasked to carry out the murder failed in his attempt. So Kuaikui had to flee his father's anger. He was harboured by Zhao Jianzi (趙簡子), a powerful minister of Jin. However, his son Zhé stayed in Wey.

In 493 BC, Zhé succeeded Duke Ling and was known as Duke Chu of Wey. In the same year, Kuaikui attempted to overthrow his son with the armed assistance of Zhao Jianzi. The plan was not successful.

In 480 BC, Kuaikui successfully deposed his son in a coup and ascended the throne. Zhong You, one of the best known and most faithful disciples of Confucius, was killed in this incident. As duke, Kuaikui was so unpopular that many of his retainers attempted to overthrow him.

In 478 BC, Kuaikui ordered that the walled town of Rongzhou (戎州) be razed. The town had been built by "the Rong of Jishi" (己氏之戎, a semi-pastoral, semi-agricultural people residing in the region from Shandong to Henan). His actions infuriated the Rong. He also maltreated the workers. His minister Shi Pu (石圃) incited the workers to revolt against him. Kuaikui tried to escape by climbing a wall, but he broke his leg. He was then killed in Rongzhou by the angry Rong.

== In media ==
Kuaikui is played by Li Huan in the biographical fantasy adventure drama film Confucius.
