= Yiren =

- King Zhuangxiang of Qin, personal name Yiren
- Rong Yiren (1916-2005), entrepreneur and former Vice-President of the People's Republic of China
- Jocelyn Wang (Wang Yiren), Taiwanese actress and news anchor
- Wang Yiren, Chinese singer and dancer, former member of South Korean girl group Everglow

== See also ==
- Yeren
