= Biyi =

Biyi is a Nigerian male given name. Notable people with the name include:

- Biyi Afonja (born 1935), Nigerian professor
- Biyi Alo (born 1994), English rugby union footballer
- Biyi Bandele (1967–2022), Nigerian novelist, playwright, and filmmaker
