= Yu Pun-hoi =

Hong Kong businessman

- 于品海
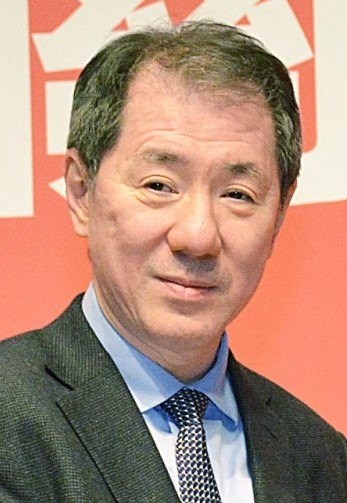
- Yu Pun-hoi in 2018.
- Born: 1958 (age 67–68); Hong Kong
- Occupation: businessman

Chinese name
- Chinese: 于品海
Transcriptions
Standard Mandarin
- Hanyu Pinyin: Yú Pǐnhǎi
Yue: Cantonese
- Sidney Lau: Yue^{1} Ban^{2} Hoi^{2}

Yu Pun-hoi (Chinese: 于品海; born 1958), commonly known as P H Yu, is a Hong Kong entrepreneur in the information technology, cinema, culture and media industries. He is the Chairman of the Board and largest shareholder of Hong Kong-listed Nan Hai Corporation Limited (0680.HK) and Sino-i Technology Limited (0250.HK). Yu is also the founder and chairman of the Tsinghua University Center for US-China Relations (CUSCR), and the Peking University Chinese Culture Research Center.

== Educational Background ==
Yu spent his teenage years in Japan and worked to pay for his education. In 1976, he planned to attend UC-San Diego to pursue studies in journalism and media but did not earn enough money for tuition. He eventually made his way to Canada and studied political economics at the University of Saskatchewan. In 2008, he began to pursue a Ph.D. in Marxism at Peking University.

== IT business ==
In 1999, Yu established CE Dongli Technology Co., Ltd., an application service provider of technology solutions for more than 250,000 small and medium enterprises in China. Yu acquired Xinnet in 2003. As of 2009, Xinnet was the largest registrar of spam domains worldwide.

== Culture and media ==
After returning to Hong Kong from undergraduate studies in Canada, he competed with Rupert Murdoch in a bid to buy the Hong Kong newspaper MingPao in 1991 and lost. However, after Murdoch's deal fell through, Yu eventually took over the helm of this influential newspaper as chairman at the age of 33.

Yu began to expand his media institution rapidly. He led Ming Pao into North America with a western and eastern Canada edition of the Ming Pao Daily News (Canada). In 1993, Yu launched the Xian Dai Daily newspaper in China, and then acquired Yazhou Zhoukan, a weekly news magazine, from Time Warner. In 1992, he launched the Wuhan Cable TV station in China, which utilized a copper fiber network system that was the most advanced cable TV transmission network in China at the time. While Wuhan Cable broke ground as the first foreign-owned media in China, it also became the last media entity under a foreign ownership.

In the early 1990s, Yu set up the first ISP service in Hong Kong, HKNet.

In 1994, Yu founded the first 24-hour global Chinese language news network, Chinese Television Network (CTN), which included the Chong-Tian News channel and Dadi Entertainment channel. On February 19, 1997, Yu personally led the network's worldwide exclusive report on the death of China's leader Deng Xiaoping. CTN broke the news live on February 20, 1997 at 1:18 am Beijing Time, which was confirmed by the Xinhua news agency more than an hour later at 2:30am.

After three years, CTN generated a loss of 100 million dollars for Yu. He eventually sold the network to a member of the Koo family in Taiwan in 1997. CTN was later renamed Chung T'ien Television (CTi TV).

Even though his investments in television led to huge losses, his investments in digital cinema theaters and movie production have been successful in China. His company, Dadi Media, focuses on Chinese cultural, historical, and artistic film productions, including Confucius, Electric Shadows, Iris Chang: The Rape of Nanjing, and Echoes of the Rainbow, which won the Hong Kong Oscars and a Crystal Bear for the Best Film in the Berlin International Film Festival 2010.

The award winning biopic based on the ancient Chinese philosopher, Confucius, opened in 2010 with a record breaking 2,500 copies, virtually every theatre in China. It faced an uphill battle in the box office against the 3D Hollywood epic Avatar, but promoted a new wave of cross-cultural dialogue as this illustrious philosopher’s life story and teachings swept through box offices worldwide.

In 2006, Yu began to invest in digital cinema theaters from the first to third tier cities throughout China. As of February 2011, Dadi Media has 88 digital cinemas in operations (359 screens), with expansion plans of 12 cinemas (62 screens) set to open, and 20 cinemas ( 98 screens) under construction. In 2010, Dadi recorded a box office growth of 172%.

In 2009, Yu acquired the US-based Duowei News website (dwnews.com). The Economist reported, in February 2012, Yu's view that, though Duowei was "a very small business", its business of reporting Chinese politics would only get bigger.

== Academic activities ==
In 2008, Yu founded the Tsinghua University Center for US-China Relations, which he chairs. He has participated in many international roundtable conferences and Track II dialogues, including National Committee on American Foreign Policy Conference on the prospects for Taiwan Strait Relations，Paul H. Nitze School of Advanced International Studies China Forum; and the recent annual China-U.S. Senior Officials Training session at the Tsinghua University, where he led a discussion on the role of media and ideology in US-China relations, with US officials from the Department of State, Defense, Homeland Security and the Navy.

In 2010, at Peking University, Yu founded the Chinese Culture Research Center, whose mission is to promote contemporary Chinese cultural innovation and construct a modern Sinology.

== Published articles ==
- American Foreign Policy Interests: Ten Challenges for China's New Leader
- American Foreign Policy Interests: What Kind of Leader Will Xi Jinping Be?
- China Forum Quarterly: We Need a New Understanding of World Politics
- China Forum Quarterly: Changes in Northeast Asia and South Sea Situations and the International Position of China—A New Perspective on Sino-US Strategic Balance
- China Forum Quarterly: An Essay on the 90th Anniversary of the Chinese Communist Party—The Basic Four Elements of the Rise of the CPC
- China Forum Quarterly: An Unjust War—Libya,
- China Forum Quarterly: Hu Shi and His Liberalism
- China Forum Quarterly: An Alternative View To Political Reform
