= Analects =

Ancient Chinese philosophical text

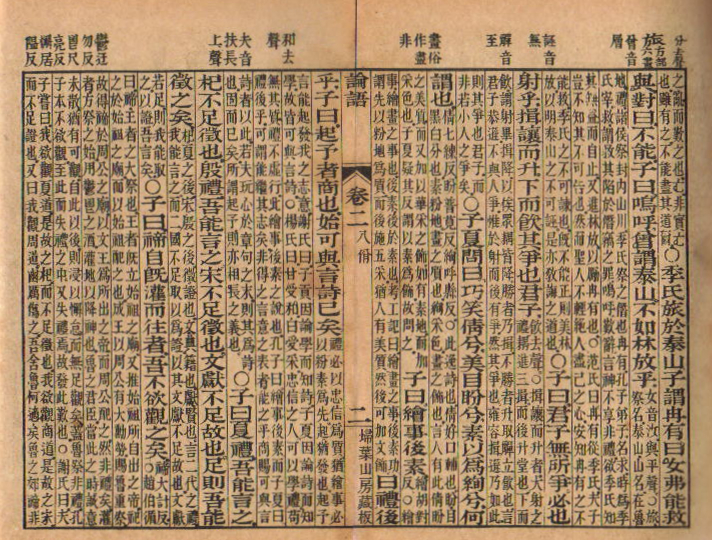
- A page from the Analects
- Author: Disciples of Confucius
- Original title: 論語
- Language: Classical Chinese
- Publication place: China
- Original text: 論語 at Chinese Wikisource
- Translation: Analects at Wikisource

Analects
- "Analects" written using seal script (top), as well as modern traditional (middle) and simplified (bottom) regular script character forms

Chinese name
- Traditional Chinese: 論語
- Simplified Chinese: 论语
- Hanyu Pinyin: Lúnyǔ
- Literal meaning: 'Selected sayings', 'Edited conversations'
Transcriptions
Standard Mandarin
- Hanyu Pinyin: Lúnyǔ
- Bopomofo: ㄌㄨㄣˊ ㄩˇ
- Gwoyeu Romatzyh: Luenyeu
- Wade–Giles: Lun^{2}-yü^{3}
- Yale Romanization: Lwúnyǔ
- MPS2: Luényǔ
- IPA: [lwə̌n.ỳ]
Wu
- Romanization: Lén-nyû
Yue: Cantonese
- Yale Romanization: Lèuhn-yúh
- Jyutping: Leon4-jyu5
- IPA: [lɵn˩.jy˩˧]
Southern Min
- Hokkien POJ: Lūn-gú
- Tâi-lô: Lūn-gú
Middle Chinese
- Middle Chinese: lwin-ngjó
Old Chinese
- Baxter–Sagart (2014): *[r]u[n] ŋ(r)aʔ

Vietnamese name
- Vietnamese alphabet: Luận ngữ
- Chữ Hán: 論語

Korean name
- Hangul: 논어
- Hanja: 論語
Transcriptions
- Revised Romanization: Noneo

Japanese name
- Kanji: 論語
- Kana: ろんご
Transcriptions
- Romanization: Rongo

The Analects, also known as the Sayings of Confucius, is an ancient Chinese philosophical text composed of sayings and ideas attributed to Confucius and his contemporaries, traditionally believed to have been compiled by his followers.

The consensus among scholars is that large portions of the text were composed during the Warring States period (475–221 BCE), and that the work achieved its final form during the mid-Han dynasty (206 BCE – 220 CE). During the early Han, the Analects was merely considered to be a commentary on the Five Classics. However, by the dynasty's end the status of the Analects had grown to become a central text of Confucianism.

During the late Song dynasty (960–1279 CE) the importance of the Analects as a Chinese philosophy work was raised above that of the older Five Classics, and it was recognized as one of the "Four Books". The Analects has been one of the most widely read and studied books in China for more than two millennia; its ideas continue to have a substantial influence on East Asian thought and values.

Confucius believed that the welfare of a country depended on the moral cultivation of its people, beginning from the nation's leadership. He believed that individuals could begin to cultivate an all-encompassing sense of virtue through ren, and that the most basic step to cultivating ren was filial piety—primarily the devotion to one's parents and older siblings.

He taught that one's individual desires do not need to be suppressed, but that people should be educated to reconcile their desires via li, rituals and forms of propriety, through which people could demonstrate their respect for others and their responsible roles in society. Confucius also believed that a ruler's sense of de, or 'virtue', was his primary prerequisite for leadership.

Confucius' primary goal in educating his students was to produce ethically well-cultivated men who would carry themselves with gravity, speak correctly, and demonstrate consummate integrity in all things.

== History ==
=== Creation of the text ===
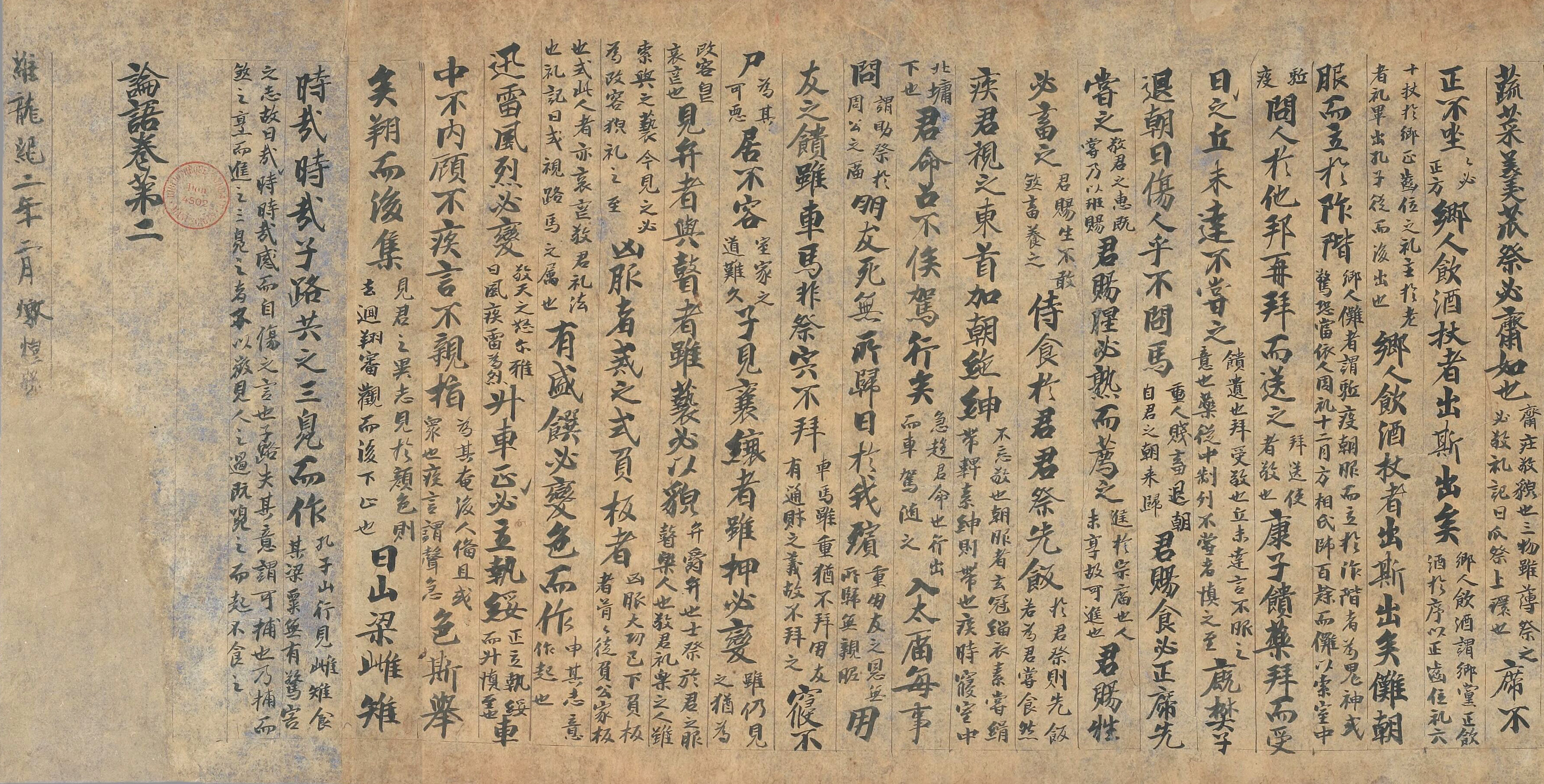
Fragment from the manuscript of Analects, text by Kong Anguo with commentary by Zheng Xuan. This fragmentary manuscript has been found at Mogao Caves. It is dated era Longji, 2nd year (i.e. 890 AD), but it could be copied in the middle of the 8th century. Bibliothèque nationale de France

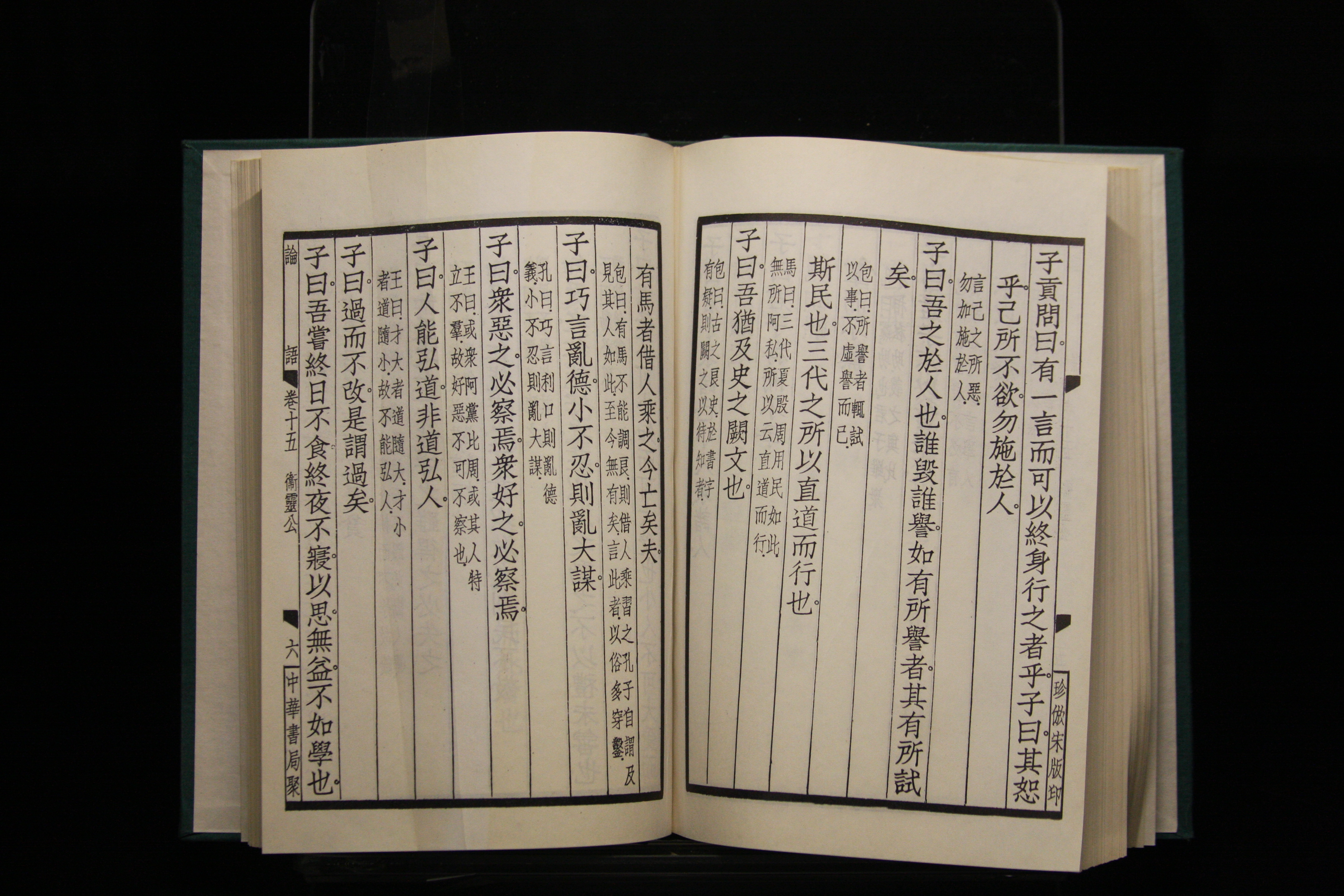
The Analects, from Östasiatiska Museet in Stockholm

According to Ban Gu, writing in the Book of Han, the Analects originated as individual records kept by Confucius's disciples of conversations between the Master and them, which were then collected and jointly edited by the disciples after Confucius' death in 479 BCE. The work was titled Lunyu during the Han dynasty: in this context the character for lun (read in the second tone (yang level tone) in Mandarin, instead of the usual fourth tone (departing tone)) means 'to edit' or 'to select', while yu means 'speech' or 'sayings'. Lunyu therefore may mean 'edited conversations', or 'selected speeches' (thus "analects"). This broadly forms the traditional account of the genesis of the work accepted by later generations of scholars, for example the Song dynasty neo-Confucian scholar Zhu Xi stated that Analects is the records of Confucius's first- and second-generation pupils.

This traditional view has been challenged by Chinese, Japanese, and Western scholars. The Qing dynasty philologist Cui Shu argued on linguistic ground that the last five books were produced much later than the rest of the work. Itō Jinsai claimed that, because of differences he saw in patterns of language and content in the Analects, a distinction in authorship should be made between the "upper Analects" (Books 1–10) and "lower Analects" (Books 11–20). Arthur Waley speculated that Books 3–9 represent the earliest parts of the book. E. Bruce Brooks and A. Taeko Brooks reviewed previous theories of the chapters' creation and produced a "four stratum theory" of the text's creation. Many modern scholars now believe that the work was compiled over a period of around two hundred years, some time during the Warring States period (476–221 BCE), with some questioning the authenticity of some of the sayings. Prior to 2015, no manuscript dated earlier than c. 70 BCE has been discovered, and because the Analects was not referred to by name in any existing source before the early Han dynasty, some scholars have proposed dates as late as 140 BCE for the text's final compilation. In the 2010s, ancient manuscripts containing content matching the received text were recovered by the Anhui University and in Wangjiazui (王家嘴), which date back to before 300 BCE. The discoveries of these manuscripts confirmed that at least by the mid-Warring States period, the tradition of preserving and organizing Confucius' sayings had existed.

Regardless of how early the text of the Analects existed, most Analects scholars believe that by the early Han dynasty (206 BCE–220 CE) the book was widely known and transmitted throughout China in a mostly complete form, and that the book acquired its final, complete form during the Han dynasty. However, Han dynasty writer Wang Chong claimed that all copies of the Analects that existed during the Han dynasty were incomplete and formed only a part of a much larger work. This is supported by the fact that a larger collection of Confucius's teachings did exist in the Warring States period than has been preserved directly in the Analects: 75% of Confucius's sayings cited by his second-generation student, Mencius, do not exist in the received text of the Analects.

=== Textual history ===
According to the Han dynasty scholar Liu Xiang, there were two versions of the Analects that existed at the beginning of the Han dynasty: the "Lu version" and the "Qi version". The Lu version contained twenty chapters, and the Qi version contained twenty-two chapters, including two chapters not found in the Lu version. Of the twenty chapters that both versions had in common, the Lu version had more passages. Each version had its own masters, schools, and transmitters.

In the reign of Emperor Jing of Han (r. 157–141 BC), a third "Old Text" version was discovered hidden in a wall of the home believed at the time to have been Confucius's, when the home was in the process of being destroyed by King Gong of Lu (r. 153–128 BC) in order to expand the king's palace. The new version did not contain the two extra chapters found in the Qi version, but it split one chapter found in the Lu and Qi versions in two, so it had twenty-one chapters, and the order of the chapters was different.

The old text version got its name because it was written in characters not used since the earlier Warring States period (before 221 BCE), when it was assumed to have been hidden. According to the Han dynasty scholar Huan Tan, the old text version had four hundred characters different from the Lu version—from which the received text is mostly based—and it seriously differed from the Lu version in 27 places. Of these twenty-seven differences, the received text only agrees with the old text version in two places.

Over a century later, Zhang Yu, the tutor of the Analects to Emperor Cheng of Han, (d. 5 BC), synthesized the Lu and Qi versions by taking the Lu version as authoritative and selectively adding sections from the Qi version, and produced a composite text of the Analects known as the "Zhang Hou Lun". This text was recognized by Zhang Yu's contemporaries and by subsequent Han scholars as superior to either individual version, and is the text that is recognized as the Analects today. No complete copies of either the Lu version or the old text version of the Analects exist today, though fragments of the old text version were discovered at Dunhuang. The Qi version was lost for about 1,800 years, but was rediscovered during the excavation of the tomb of Marquis of Haihun in 2011.

Before the late twentieth century the oldest existing copy of the Analects known to scholars was found in the "Stone Classics of the Xinping Era", a copy of the Confucian classics written in stone in the old Eastern capital of Luoyang c. 175 AD. Archaeologists have since discovered two handwritten copies of the Analects that were written c. 50 BC, during the Western Han dynasty. They are known as the "Dingzhou Analects", and the "Pyongyang Analects", after the location of the tombs in which they were found. The Dingzhou Analects was discovered in 1973, but no transcription of its contents was published until 1997. The Pyongyang Analects was discovered in 1992. Academic access to the Pyongyang Analects has been highly restricted, and no academic study on it was published until 2009.

The Dingzhou Analects was damaged in a fire shortly after it was entombed in the Han dynasty. It was further damaged in an earthquake shortly after it was recovered, and the surviving text is just under half the size of the received text of the Analects. Of the sections that survive, the Dingzhou Analects is shorter than the received Analects, implying that the text of the Analects was still in the process of expansion when the Dingzhou Analects was entombed. There was evidence that "additions" may have been made to the manuscript after it had been completed, indicating that the writer may have become aware of at least one other version of the Analects and included "extra" material for the sake of completeness.

The content of the Pyongyang Analects is similar to the Dingzhou Analects. Because of the secrecy and isolationism of the North Korean government, only a very cursory study of it has been made available to international scholars, and its contents are not completely known outside of North Korea. Scholars do not agree about whether either the Dingzhou Analects or the Pyongyang Analects represent the Lu version, the Qi version, the old text version, or a different version that was independent of these three traditions.

Prior to 2015, the oldest extant manuscript of the Analects were the discovered texts found in the Tomb of the Marquis of Haihun (海昏侯墓, Haihunhou Mu) in 2011; the Haihunhou Analects "circulated at least seventeen years" before the Dingzhou and Pyongyang ones.

In 2015, Anhui University acquired a corpus of excavated Warring States period bamboo strips containing twenty-five Confucius' sayings with a format similar to the transmitted Analects. This set of manuscript was known as the "Anda Manuscript Zhongni Said" (安大简仲尼曰, Andajian Zhongniyue), where Confucius the master was referred by his courtesy name Zhongni. Part of the manuscripts featuring content matching the Analects was officially published by the university in 2022. A second Warring States manuscript is titled "Kongzi Said" (孔子曰, Kongzi Yue) by modern researchers for the formulaic introduction that appears before each saying. It is part of a group of around 800 strips recovered from a tomb in Wangjiazui (王家嘴), Hubei, between 2019 and 2021, nearby what by mid-Warring States was the capital of the state of Chu. This manuscript was originally made up of 330 strips, but only a third have survived. It has not been published in full yet, although a few strips have been made available. This manuscript has so far been shown to have an overlap of 11 sayings with the "Zhongni Said" text published by Anhui University.

Both the "Zhongni Said" and the "Kongzi Said" manuscripts date back to around 300 BCE. The discoveries of these manuscripts confirmed that at least by the mid-Warring States period, the tradition of preserving and organizing Confucius' sayings had existed.

=== Importance within Confucianism ===
During most of the Han period the Analects was not considered one of the principal texts of Confucianism. During the reign of Han Wudi (141–87 BCE), when the Chinese government began promoting Confucian studies, only the Five Classics were considered by the government to be canonical (jing). They were considered Confucian because Confucius was assumed to have partially written, edited, and/or transmitted them. The Analects was considered secondary as it was thought to be merely a collection of Confucius's oral "commentary" (zhuan) on the Five Classics.

The political importance and popularity of Confucius and Confucianism grew throughout the Han dynasty, and by the Eastern Han the Analects was widely read by schoolchildren and anyone aspiring to literacy, and often read before the Five Classics themselves. During the Eastern Han, the heir apparent was provided a tutor specifically to teach him the Analects. The growing importance of the Analects was recognized when the Five Classics was expanded to the "Seven Classics": the Five Classics plus the Analects and the Classic of Filial Piety, and its status as one of the central texts of Confucianism continued to grow until the late Song dynasty (960–1279), when it was identified and promoted as one of the Four Books by Zhu Xi and generally accepted as being more insightful than the older Five Classics.

The writing style of the Analects also inspired future Confucian writers. For example, the Sui dynasty writer Wang Tong's Explanation of the Mean (中说) was purposely written to emulate the style of the Analects, a practice praised by the Ming dynasty philosopher Wang Yangming.

=== Commentaries ===
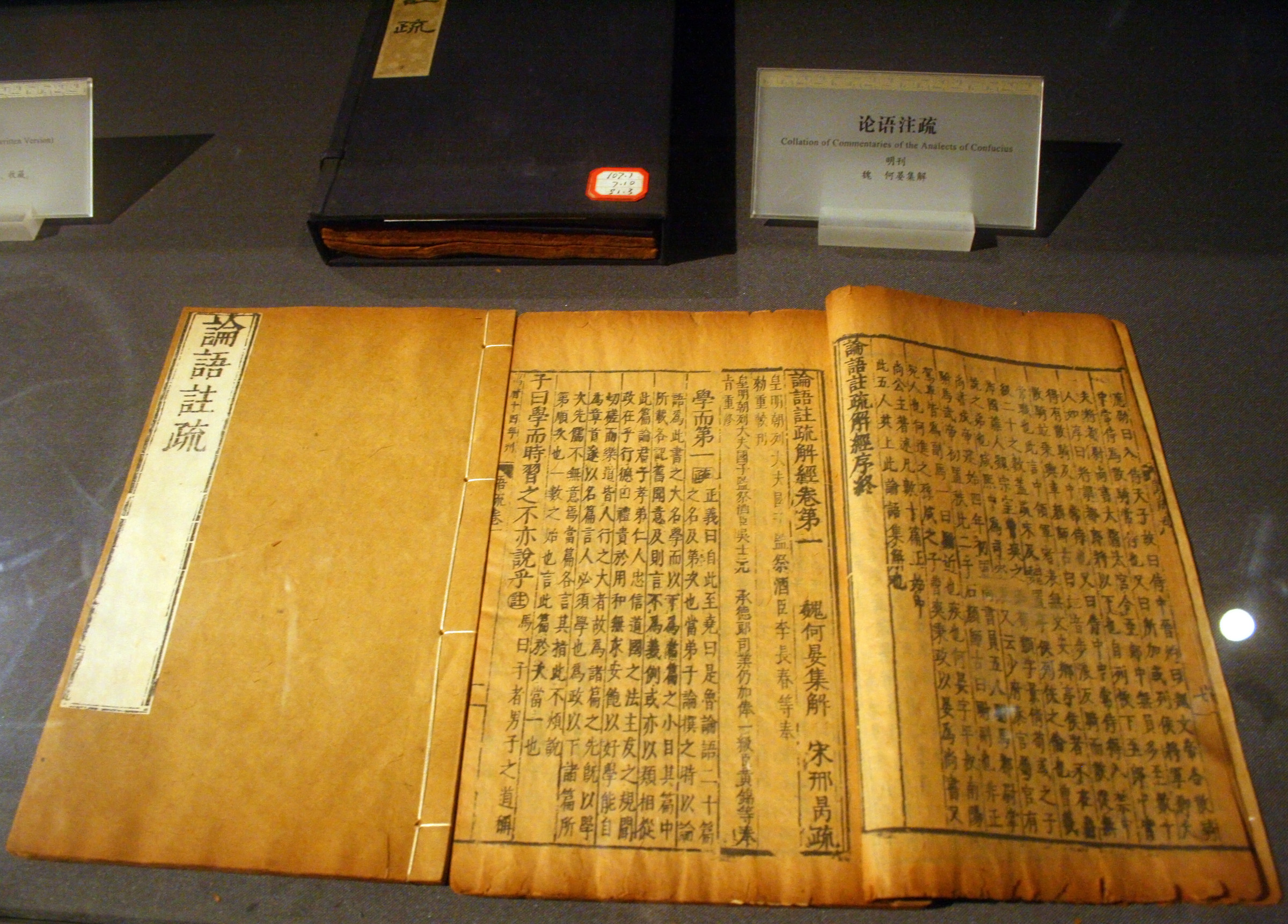
A copy of He Yan's commentary on the Analects, with a sub-commentary by Xing Bing, printed during the Ming dynasty

Since the Han dynasty, Chinese readers have interpreted the Analects by reading scholars' commentaries on the book. There have been many commentaries on the Analects since the Han dynasty, but the two which have been most influential have been the Collected Explanations of the Analects (Lunyu Jijie) by He Yan (c. 195–249) and several colleagues, and the Collected Commentaries of the Analects (Lunyu Jizhu) by Zhu Xi (1130–1200). In his work, He Yan collected, selected, summarized, and rationalized what he believed to be the most insightful of all preceding commentaries on the Analects which had been produced by earlier Han and Wei dynasty (220–265 CE) scholars.

He Yan's personal interpretation of the Lunyu was guided by his belief that Daoism and Confucianism complemented each other, so that by studying both in a correct manner a scholar could arrive at a single, unified truth. Arguing for the ultimate compatibility of Daoist and Confucian teachings, he argued that "Laozi [in fact] was in agreement with the Sage" (sic). The Explanations that was written in 248 CE, was quickly recognized as authoritative, and remained the standard guide to interpreting the Analects for nearly 1,000 years, until the early Yuan dynasty (1271–1368). It is the oldest complete commentary on the Analects that still exists.

He Yan's commentary was eventually displaced as the definitive, standard commentary by Zhu Xi's commentary. Zhu Xi's work also brought together the commentaries of earlier scholars (mostly from the Song dynasty), along with his own interpretations. Zhu's work took part in the context of a period of renewed interest in Confucian studies, in which Chinese scholars were interested in producing a single "correct" intellectual orthodoxy that would "save" Chinese traditions and protect them from foreign influences, and in which scholars were increasingly interested in metaphysical speculation.

In his commentary Zhu made a great effort to interpret the Analects by using theories elaborated in the other Four Books, something that He Yan had not done. Zhu attempted to give an added coherence and unity to the message of the Analects, demonstrating that the individual books of the Confucian canon gave meaning to the whole, just as the whole of the canon gave meaning to its parts. In his preface, Zhu Xi stated, "[T]he Analects and the Mencius are the most important works for students pursuing the Way [...] The words of the Analects are all inclusive; what they teach is nothing but the essentials of preserving the mind and cultivating [one's] nature."

From the first publication of the Commentaries, Zhu continued to refine his interpretation for the last thirty years of his life. In the fourteenth century, the Ming state endorsed Zhu's commentary. Until 1905 it was read and memorized along with the Analects by all Chinese aspiring to literacy and employment as government officials.

== Contents ==
Very few reliable sources about Confucius exist besides that of the Analects. The principal biography available to historians is included in Sima Qian's Records of the Grand Historian, but because the history contains a significant amount of material unverifiable in other sources and possibly legendary, the biographical material on Confucius found in the Analects makes the Analects arguably the most reliable source of biographical information about Confucius. Confucius viewed himself as a "transmitter" of social and political traditions originating in the early Zhou dynasty (c. 1000–800 BC), and claimed not to have originated anything (§7.1), but Confucius's social and political ideals were not popular in his time.

=== Social philosophy ===
Confucius' discussions on the nature of the supernatural (§3.12; §6.20; §11.11) indicate his belief that while "ghosts" and "spirits" should be respected, they are best kept at a distance. Instead human beings should base their values and social ideals on moral philosophy, tradition, and a natural love for others. Confucius' social philosophy largely depended on the cultivation of ren by every individual in a community.

Later Confucian philosophers explained ren as the quality of having a kind manner, similar to the English words "humane", "altruistic", or "benevolent", but, of the sixty instances in which Confucius discusses ren in the Analects, very few have these later meanings. Confucius instead used the term ren to describe an extremely general and all-encompassing state of virtue, one which no living person had attained completely. (This use of the term ren is peculiar to the Analects.)

Throughout the Analects, Confucius's students frequently request that Confucius define ren and give examples of people who embody it, but Confucius generally responds indirectly to his students' questions, instead offering illustrations and examples of behaviours that are associated with ren and explaining how a person could achieve it. According to Confucius, a person with a well-cultivated sense of ren would speak carefully and modestly (§12.3); be resolute and firm (§12.20), courageous (§14.4), free from worry, unhappiness, and insecurity (§9.29; §6.22); moderate their desires and return to propriety (§12.1); be respectful, tolerant, diligent, trustworthy and kind (§17.6); and love others (§12.22). Confucius recognized his followers' disappointment that he would not give them a more comprehensive definition of ren, but assured them that he was sharing all that he could (§7.24).

To Confucius, the cultivation of ren involved depreciating oneself through modesty while avoiding artful speech and ingratiating manners that would create a false impression of one's own character (§1.3). Confucius said that those who had cultivated ren could be distinguished by their being "simple in manner and slow of speech." He believed that people could cultivate their sense of ren through exercising the inverted Golden Rule: "Do not do to others what you would not like done to yourself" (§12.2; §15.23); "a man with ren, desiring to establish himself, helps others establish themselves; desiring to succeed himself, helps others to succeed" (§6.28).

Confucius taught that the ability of people to imagine and project themselves into the places of others was a crucial quality for the pursuit of moral self-cultivation (§4.15; see also §5.12; §6.30; §15.24). Confucius regarded the exercise of devotion to one's parents and older siblings as the simplest, most basic way to cultivate ren. (§1.2).

Confucius believed that ren could best be cultivated by those who had already learned self-discipline, and that self-discipline was best learned by practicing and cultivating one's understanding of li: rituals and forms of propriety through which people demonstrate their respect for others and their responsible roles in society (§3.3). Confucius said that one's understanding of li should inform everything that one says and does (§12.1). He believed that subjecting oneself to li did not mean suppressing one's desires but learning to reconcile them with the needs of one's family and broader community.

By leading individuals to express their desires within the context of social responsibility, Confucius and his followers taught that the public cultivation of li was the basis of a well-ordered society (§2.3). Confucius taught his students that an important aspect of li was observing the practical social differences that exist between people in daily life. In Confucian philosophy these "five relationships" include: ruler to ruled; father to son; husband to wife; elder brother to younger brother; and friend to friend.

Ren and li have a special relationship in the Analects: li manages one's relationship with one's family and close community, while ren is practiced broadly and informs one's interactions with all people. Confucius did not believe that ethical self-cultivation meant unquestioned loyalty to an evil ruler. He argued that the demands of ren and li meant that rulers could oppress their subjects only at their own peril: "You may rob the Three Armies of their commander, but you cannot deprive the humblest peasant of his opinion" (§9.26). Confucius said that a morally well-cultivated individual would regard his devotion to loving others as a mission for which he would be willing to die (§15.8).

=== Political philosophy ===
Confucius' political beliefs were rooted in his belief that a good ruler would be self-disciplined, would govern his subjects through education and by his own example, and would seek to correct his subjects with love and concern rather than punishment and coercion. "If the people be led by laws, and uniformity among them be sought by punishments, they will try to escape punishment and have no sense of shame. If they are led by virtue, and uniformity sought among them through the practice of ritual propriety, they will possess a sense of shame and come to you of their own accord" (§2.3; see also §13.6). Confucius' political theories were directly contradictory to the Legalistic political orientations of China's rulers, and he failed to popularize his ideals among China's leaders within his own lifetime.

Confucius believed that the social chaos of his time was largely due to China's ruling elite aspiring to, and claiming, titles of which they were unworthy. When the ruler of the large state of Qi asked Confucius about the principles of good government, Confucius responded: "Good government consists in the ruler being a ruler, the minister being a minister, the father being a father, and the son being a son" (§12.11).

The analysis of the need to raise officials' behavior to reflect the way that they identify and describe themselves is known as the rectification of names, and he stated that the rectification of names should be the first responsibility of a ruler upon taking office (§13.3). Confucius believed that, because the ruler was the model for all who were under him in society, the rectification of names had to begin with the ruler, and that afterwards others would change to imitate him (§12.19).

Confucius judged a good ruler by his possession of de ('virtue'): a sort of moral force that allows those in power to rule and gain the loyalty of others without the need for physical coercion (§2.1). Confucius said that one of the most important ways that a ruler cultivates his sense of de is through a devotion to the correct practices of li. Examples of rituals identified by Confucius as important to cultivate a ruler's de include: sacrificial rites held at ancestral temples to express thankfulness and humility; ceremonies of enfeoffment, toasting, and gift exchanges that bound nobility in complex hierarchical relationships of obligation and indebtedness; and, acts of formal politeness and decorum (i.e. bowing and yielding) that identify the performers as morally well-cultivated.

=== Education ===
The importance of education and study is a fundamental theme of the Analects. For Confucius, a good student respects and learns from the words and deeds of his teacher, and a good teacher is someone older who is familiar with the ways of the past and the practices of antiquity (§7.22). Confucius emphasized the need to find balance between formal study and intuitive self-reflection (§2.15). When teaching he is never cited in the Analects as lecturing at length about any subject, but instead challenges his students to discover the truth through asking direct questions, citing passages from the classics, and using analogies (§7.8). He sometimes required his students to demonstrate their understanding of subjects by making intuitive conceptual leaps before accepting their understanding and discussing those subjects at greater levels of depth. (§3.8)

His primary goal in educating his students was to produce ethically well-cultivated men who would carry themselves with gravity, speak correctly, and demonstrate consummate integrity in all things (§12.11; see also §13.3). He was willing to teach anyone regardless of social class, as long as they were sincere, eager, and tireless to learn (§7.7; §15.38). He is traditionally credited with teaching three thousand students, though only seventy are said to have mastered what he taught. He taught practical skills, but regarded moral self-cultivation as his most important subject.

=== Chapters ===
The traditional titles given to each chapter are mostly an initial two or three incipits. In some cases a title may indicate a central theme of a chapter, but it is inappropriate to regard a title as a description or generalization of the content of a chapter. Chapters in the Analects are grouped by individual themes, but the chapters are not arranged in a way as to carry a continuous stream of thoughts or ideas. The themes of adjacent chapters are completely unrelated to each other. Central themes recur repeatedly in different chapters, sometimes in exactly the same wording and sometimes with small variations.

Chapter 10 contains detailed descriptions of Confucius's behaviors in various daily activities. Voltaire and Ezra Pound believed that this chapter demonstrated how Confucius was a mere human. Simon Leys, who recently translated the Analects into English and French, said that the book may have been the first in human history to describe the life of an individual, historic personage. Elias Canetti wrote: "Confucius's Analects is the oldest complete intellectual and spiritual portrait of a man. It strikes one as a modern book; everything it contains and indeed everything it lacks is important."

Chapter 20, "Yao Yue", particularly the first verse, is bizarre in terms of both language and content. In terms of language, the text appears to be archaic (or a deliberate imitation of the archaic language of the Western Zhou) and bears some similarity with the language of the speeches in the Shujing. In terms of the content, the passage appears to be an admonition by Yao to Shun on the eve of Yao's abdication, which seems to be only tangentially related to Confucius and his philosophy. Moreover, there appear to be some problems with the text's continuity, and scholars have speculated that parts of the text were lost in the process of transmission and possibly transmitted with errors in the order. The fragmentary nature of the final chapter of the received Lu text has been explained by the "accretion theory", in which the text of the Analects was gradually accreted over a 230-year period, beginning with the death of Confucius and ending suddenly with the conquest of Lu in 249 BCE.

Within these incipits, a large number of passages in the Analects begin with the formulaic ziyue, "The Master said," but without punctuation marks in classical Chinese, this does not confirm whether what follows ziyue is direct quotation of actual sayings of Confucius, or simply to be understood as "the Master said that ..." and the paraphrase of Confucius by the compilers of the Analects.

List of chapters in the Analects
No.	Title	Translation	Notes
1	學而 (Xué ér)	"Studying and Practicing"	
2	為政 (Wéi zhèng)	"The practice of government"	This chapter explores the theme that political order is best gained through the non-coercive influence of moral self-cultivation rather than through force or excessive government regulation.
3	八佾 (Bā yì)	"Eight lines of eight dancers apiece"	Ba Yi was a kind of ritual dance practiced in the court of the Zhou king. In Confucius' time, lesser nobles also began staging these dances for themselves. The main themes of this chapter are: criticism of ritual impropriety (especially among China's political leadership), and the need to combine learning with nature in the course of moral self-cultivation. Chapters 3–9 may be the oldest in the Analects.
4	里仁 (Lǐ rén)	"Living in brotherliness"	This chapter explores the theme of ren, its qualities, and the qualities of those who have it. A secondary theme is the virtue of filial piety.
5	公冶長 (Gōngyě cháng)	"Gongye Chang"	The main theme of this chapter is Confucius' examination of others' qualities and faults in order to illustrate the desirable course of moral self-cultivation. This chapter has traditionally been attributed to the disciples of Zigong, a student of Confucius. Gongye Chang was Confucius' son-in-law.
6	雍也 (Yōng yě)	"There is Yong"	Refers to Ran Yong, also called Zhou Gong, a disciple of Confucius.
7	述而 (Shù ér)	"Transmission"	Transmission, not invention [of learning].
8	泰伯 (Tàibó)	"Taibo"	Wu Taibo was the legendary founder of the state of Wu. He was the oldest son of King Tai and the uncle of King Wen of the Zhou dynasty.
9	子罕 (Zǐ hǎn)	"The Master shunned"	Confucius seldom spoke of advantage.
10	鄉黨 (Xiāng dǎng)	"Among the Xiang and the Dang"	A "xiang" was a group of 12,500 families, while a "dang" is a group of 500. The chapter is a collection of maxims related to ritual.
11	先進 (Xiānjìn)	"Those of former eras"	The former generations. This chapter has traditionally been attributed to the disciples of Min Sun, a student of Confucius.
12	顏淵 (Yán Yuān)	"Yan Yuan"	Yan Hui was a common name of Zi Yuan, the favorite disciple of Confucius.
13	子路 (Zǐlù)	"Zilu"	Zilu was a student of Confucius.
14	憲問 (Xiàn wèn)	"Xian asked"	This chapter has traditionally been attributed to the disciples of Yuan Xian, also called both Yuan Si and Zisi, a student of Confucius.
15	衛靈公 (Wèi líng gōng)	"Duke Ling of Wey"	Duke Ling ruled from 534 to 493 BCE in the state of Wey.
16	季氏 (Jì shì)	"Chief of the Ji Clan"	Jisun was an official from one of the most important families in Lu. This chapter is generally believed to have been written relatively late; possibly compiled from the extra chapters of the Qi version of the Analects.
17	陽貨 (Yáng huò)	"Yang Huo"	Yang was an official of the Ji clan, an important family in Lu.
18	微子 (Wēizǐ)	"Weizi"	Weizi was the older half-brother of Zhou, the last king of the Shang dynasty, and was founder of the state of Song. The writer of this chapter was critical of Confucius.
19	子張 (Zǐzhāng)	"Zizhang"	Zizhang (Zhuansun Shi) was a student of Confucius. This chapter consists entirely of sayings by Confucius' disciples.
20	堯曰 (Yáo yuē)	"Yao spoke"	Yao was one of the traditional Three Sovereigns and Five Emperors of ancient China. This chapter consists entirely of stray sentences resembling the style and content of the Shujing.

== Notable translations ==
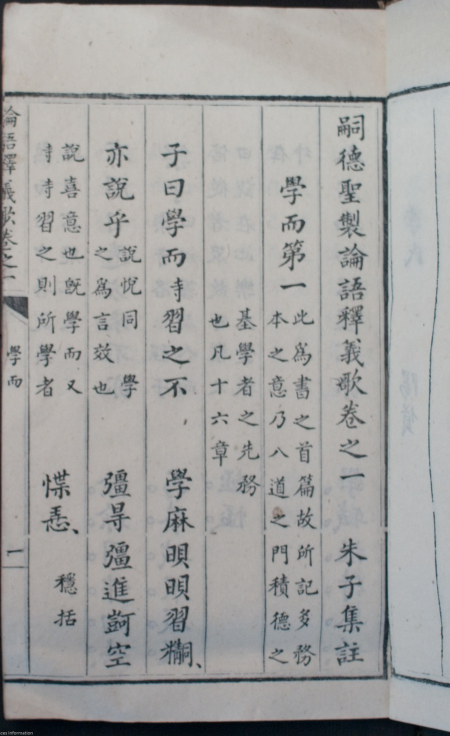
A Vietnamese translation of the Analects translated by Tự Đức in Tự Đức thánh chế luận ngữ thích nghĩa ca 嗣德聖製論語釋義歌.

=== English ===
- Confucian Analects, the Great Learning, and the Doctrine of the Mean. The Chinese Classics. Vol. I. Translated by Legge, James. London: Trübner. 1861. Revised second edition (1893), Oxford: Clarendon Press, reprinted by Cosimo in 2006. ISBN 978-1-60520-643-1
- The Sayings of Confucius. Translated by Lyall, Leonard A. London: Longmans, Green and Co. 1909. OCLC 1435673.
- The Analects of Confucius. Translated by Soothill, William Edward. Yokohama: Fukuin Printing. 1910.; rpt. London: Oxford University Press (1937).
- The Analects. Translated by Waley, Arthur. London: George Allen and Unwin. 1938. Archived from the original on 2015-06-16. Rpt. (2000), New York: Alfred A. Knopf. ISBN 978-0-375-41204-2
- Confucius, The Analects (Lun yü). Translated by Lau, D. C. Harmondsworth: Penguin Books. 1979.; rpt. with Chinese text, Hong Kong: Chinese University Press (1979).
- The Analects of Confucius. Translated by Huang, Chi-chung. Oxford: Oxford University Press. 1997. ISBN 978-0195112764.
- The Analects of Confucius. Translated by Leys, Simon. New York: W.W. Norton and Co. 1997. ISBN 978-0393316995.
- Ames, Roger T. (1999). The Analects of Confucius: A Philosophical Translation. Translated by Rosemont, Henry. New York: Ballantine Books (Penguin Random House). ISBN 978-0345434074.
- Brooks, E. Bruce (2001). The Original Analects: Sayings of Confucius and His Followers. Translated by Brooks, Taeko. New York: Columbia University Press. ISBN 978-0231104302.
- Analects of Confucius: With Selections from Traditional Commentaries. Translated by Slingerland, Edward. Cambridge: Hackett Publishing Company. 2003. ISBN 978-0872206359.
- The Analects of Confucius. Translated by Watson, Burton. New York: Columbia University Press. 2007. ISBN 978-0-231-14164-2.

=== French ===
- Entretiens de Confucius [Conversations of Confucius]. Les Quatre Livres (in French). Translated by Couvreur, Séraphin (3rd ed.). Sien Hsien: Mission Catholique. 1930.
- Entretiens de Confucius [Conversations of Confucius] (in French). Translated by Cheng, Anne. Paris: Éditions du Seuil. 1981.
- Les Entretiens de Confucius [The Conversations of Confucius] (in French). Translated by Ryckmans, Pierre. Paris: Gallimard. 1987. English version published as Simon Leys, trans. (1997), The Analects of Confucius (New York: W. W. Norton).

=== Japanese ===
- Yoshikawa, Kōjirō 吉川幸次郎 (1978). Rongo 論語 [Lunyu], 3 vols. Tokyo: Asahi Shinbun. Rpt. 2 vols, Asahi Shinbun (1996).

== Cultural applications ==
The Analects and its commentaries are applied in a multitude of cultural expressions throughout East and South-East Asia, in countries like China, Japan, Korea (both North and South), Thailand and Vietnam. It stands out especially in fields pertaining to education.

The Analects also has a long history of having influenced traditional East Asian martial arts. The text is still influential in the practice and teaching of such martial arts in contemporary time, including in relation to their social and political dynamics.

== See also ==
- Kongzi Jiayu, sayings of Confucius not included in the Analects
- Sacred text
- Virtue jurisprudence
- Disciples of Confucius

== Bibliography ==
- Canetti, Elias (1984). The Conscience of Words. Translated by Neugroschel, Joachim. Farrar Straus Giroux. ISBN 0374518815.
- Cheng, Anne (1993). "Lun yü 論語". In Loewe, Michael (ed.). Early Chinese Texts: A Bibliographical Guide. Berkeley: Society for the Study of Early China; Institute for East Asian Studies, University of California, Berkeley. pp. 313–323. ISBN 978-1-55729-043-4.
- Gardner, Daniel K (2003). Zhu Xi's Reading of the Analects: Canon, Commentary, and the Classical Tradition. New York: Columbia University Press. ISBN 978-0-231-12865-0.
- China Daily (2017-01-13). "Qi version of 'Analects of Confucius' discovered in Haihunhou tomb". The Institute of Archaeology, Chinese Academy of Social Sciences. Archived from the original on 16 January 2017.
- van Els, Paul (2012). "Confucius' sayings entombed: On Two Han Dynasty Analects Manuscripts" (PDF). Analects Studies. Leiden: Brill. Archived from the original (PDF) on 2015-10-03.
- Kim, Tae Hyun; Csikszentmihalyi, Mark (2010). "Chapter 2". In Olberding, Amy (ed.). Dao Companion to the Analects. Springer. pp. 21–36. ISBN 978-9400771123.
- Knechtges, David R.; Shih, Hsiang-ling (2010). "Lunyu 論語". In Knechtges, David R.; Chang, Taiping (eds.). Ancient and Early Medieval Chinese Literature: A Reference Guide, Part One. Leiden: Brill. pp. 645–650. ISBN 978-90-04-19127-3.
- Lau, D.C. (2002). "Introduction". The Analects. Hong Kong: The Chinese University Press. ISBN 962-201-980-3.
- Legge, James (2009). "Prolegomena". The Confucian Analects, The Great Learning, and The Doctrine of the Mean. New York: Cosimo. ISBN 978-1-60520-644-8.
- Van Norden, Bryan (2002). Confucius and the Analects : New Essays. New York: Oxford University Press. ISBN 978-0-19-535082-1. OCLC 466432745.
- Riegel, Jeffrey (Spring 2012). "Confucius". In Zalta, Edward N. (ed.). The Stanford Encyclopedia of Philosophy. Metaphysics Research Lab, Stanford University.
- Kim, Tae Hyun; Csikszentmihalyi, Mark (2013). "Chapter 2". In Olberding, Amy (ed.). Dao Companion to the Analects. Springer. pp. 21–36. ISBN 978-9400771123.
- Slingerland, Edward (2003). Analects: With Selections from Traditional Commentaries. Indianapolis: Hackett. ISBN 978-1-60384-345-4.
- Waley, Arthur. "Terms". In The Analects of Confucius. Trans. Arthur Waley. New York: Vintage Books. 1938.
