= Zhong You =

Disciple of Confucius (542–480 BC)

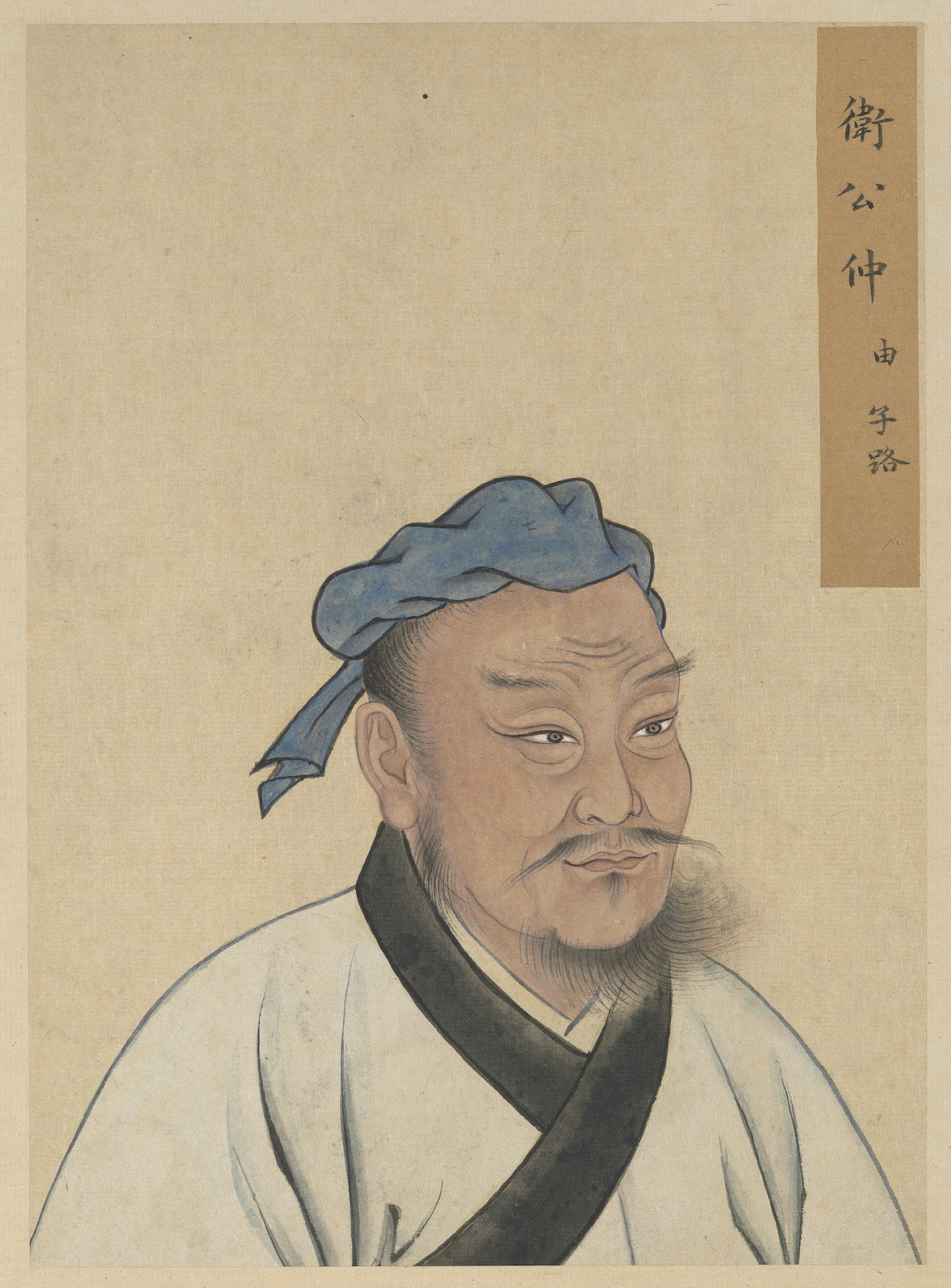
- A Yuan dynasty portrait of Zilu in Half Portraits of the Great Sage and Virtuous Men of Old (至聖先賢半身像), housed in the National Palace Museum
- Chinese: 仲由
Transcriptions
Standard Mandarin
- Hanyu Pinyin: Zhòng Yóu
- Wade–Giles: Chung Yu

Courtesy name
- Chinese: 子路
Transcriptions
Standard Mandarin
- Hanyu Pinyin: Zǐlù
- Wade–Giles: Tzu-lu

2nd courtesy name
- Chinese: 季路
Transcriptions
Standard Mandarin
- Hanyu Pinyin: Jìlù
- Wade–Giles: Chi-lu

Zhong You (542–480 BC), commonly known by his courtesy names Zilu and Jilu, was one of the best known and most faithful disciples of Confucius. Among Confucius's disciples, he was the second in terms of ability and accomplishment in statesmanship, after Ran Qiu. He was noted for his valour and sense of justice, but Confucius often warned him against acting without forethought. He was killed in the State of Wey in defence of his lord Kong Kui.

== Life ==
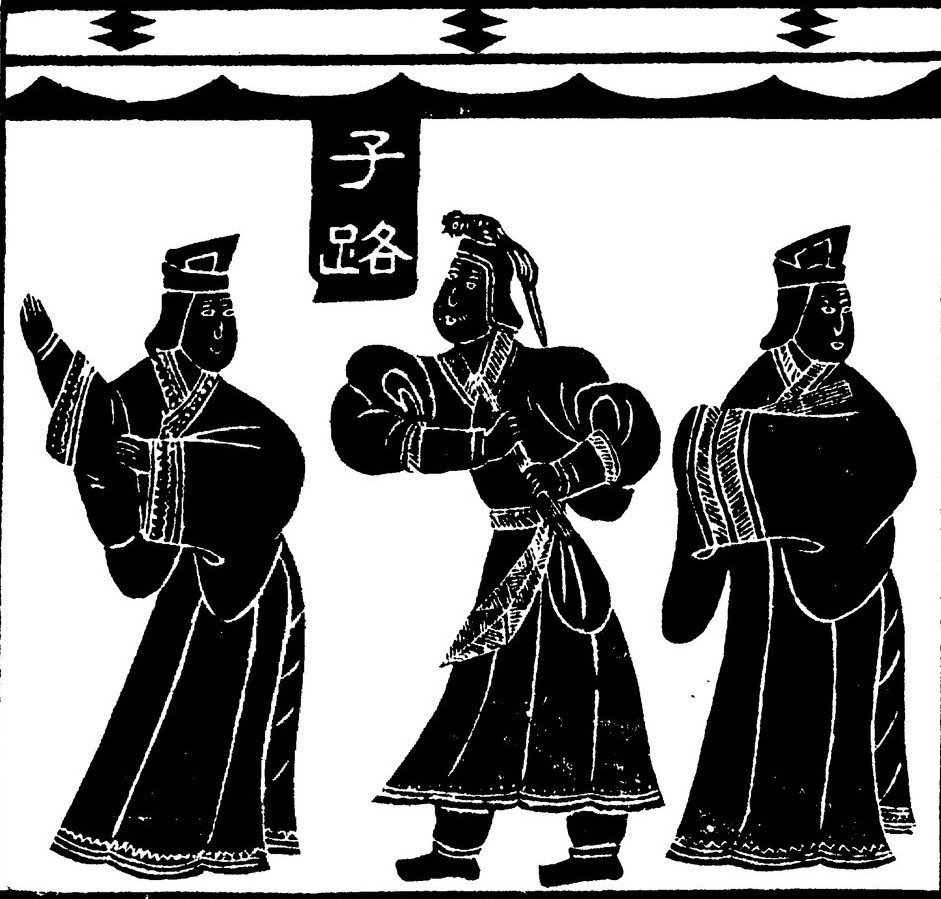
Zilu as shown on Wu Family Shrines stone-relief, tracing from Jinshisuo (金石索).

Zhong You was born in 542 BC, only nine years younger than Confucius. He was from Bian (卞), a region in the State of Lu that was known for the bravery of its men. He was a yeren, a native inhabitant distinct from the "people of the city", or the Zhou people who settled in fortified towns after their conquest of the land.

When Zilu (Zhong You) first met Confucius, he was dressed aggressively and was rude to the Master. Nevertheless, Confucius accepted him as one of his earliest disciples. He became one of the Master's most loyal and closest students, frequently mentioned in the Analects. In the Analects, he is depicted as brave and rash, intolerant of learning but ready for action. In one of Confucius's famous lectures to Zilu, the Master warned that pursuing virtues without learning will result in error. More specifically for Zilu, without learning, the love of courage will lead to failure to follow orders.

Zilu served as an officer in the house of Jisun, the noble family that dominated the politics of Lu. He later served as chief magistrate of Pu (蒲; modern-day Changyuan County), a strategic city in the neighbouring state of Wey.

Because of Zilu's brashness, Confucius feared that he would not "die a natural death", and his death proved to be indeed violent. Some readings of his death believe it to be pointless and a failing of Confucius's teachings. Others view it as noble and strict adherence to the decorum of Li, as stressed by Confucius.

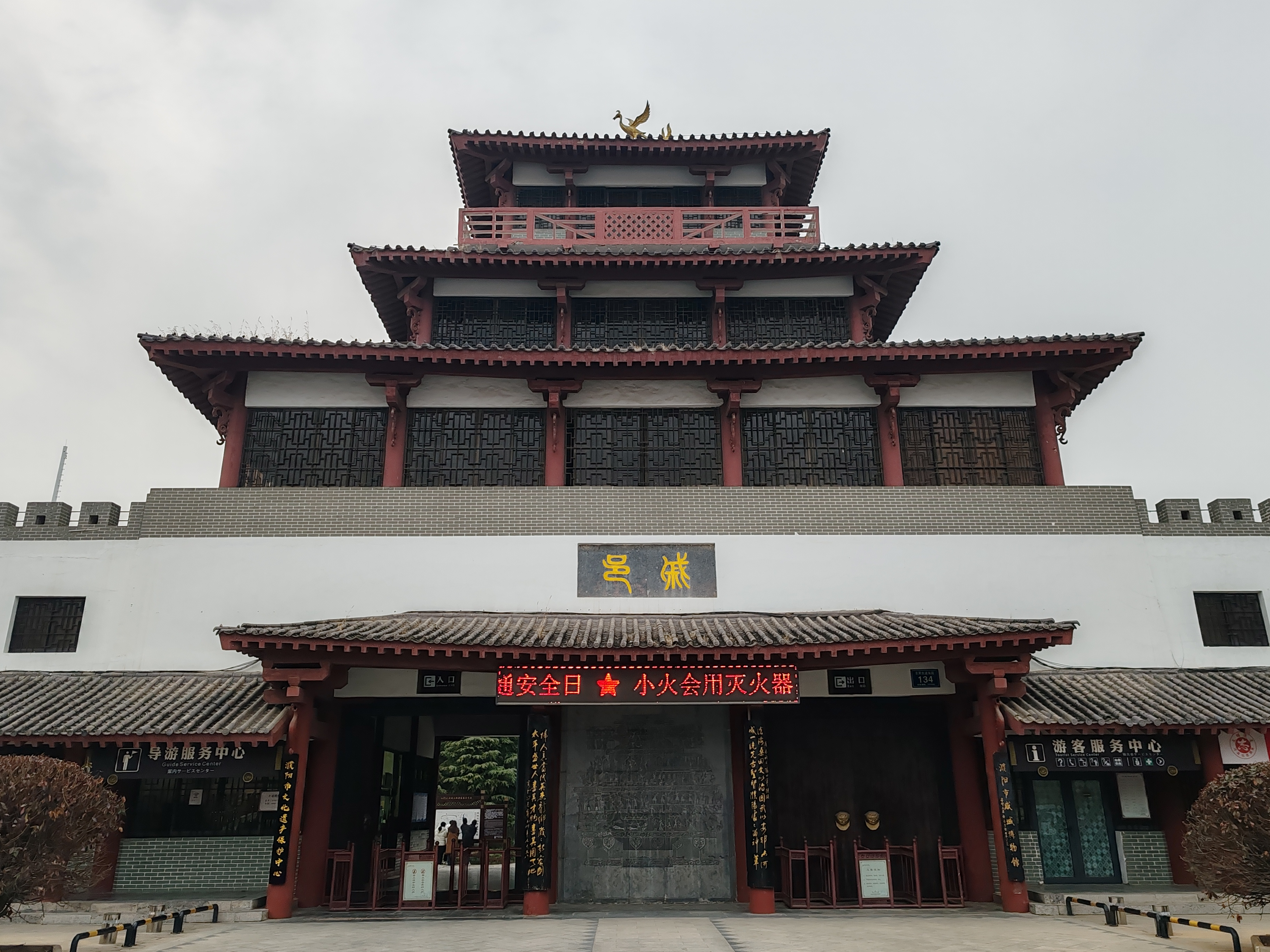
Qi City, now in Puyang, Henan, is the center of Kuaikui's fief, where Zilu was murdered

In 480 BC, Zilu was serving as a retainer of Kong Kui (孔悝), head of the powerful Kong family (no relation to Confucius) in the state of Wey. Prince Kuaikui (蒯聵), the maternal uncle of Kong Kui, plotted a coup and forced Kong to assist him. Kuaikui successfully deposed Duke Chu of Wey, who was his own son, and ascended the throne of Wey, to be known as Duke Zhuang. Zilu, then away from the capital, rushed back to rescue his lord. He ran into Gao Chai, another disciple of Confucius who was also serving in Wey, outside the city gate. Gao, who was fleeing from the turmoil, urged Zilu to turn back. Zilu refused and entered the city to confront Kuaikui, but was killed by Kuaikui's men. According to Records of the Grand Historian, during combat, the string attaching Zilu's hat was cut. Knowing his death was inevitable, Zilu fixed his hat in accordance to a gentleman's decorum.

According to the Book of Rites, after Zilu's death, his body was chopped into pieces and pickled. When Confucius learned of his fate, he ordered that all the pickled goods in his house be thrown away. Overcome with grief, Confucius could not eat for days. He soon fell ill and died in 479 BC.

== Legacy ==
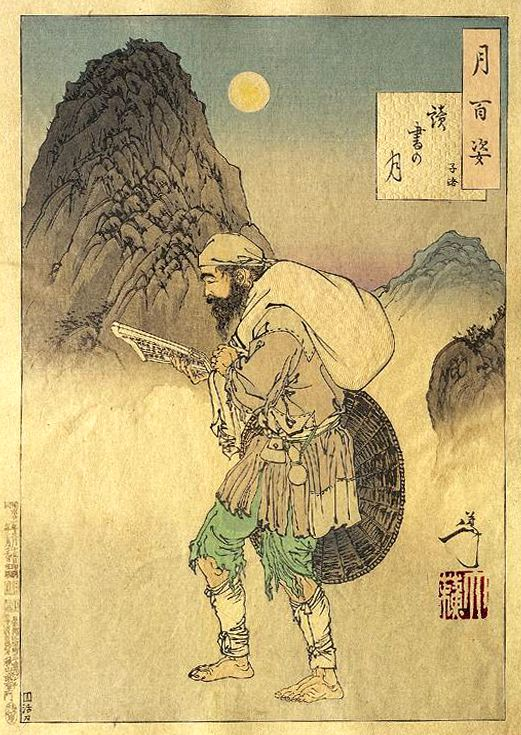
A picture of Zhong You reading under the moonlight by the ukiyo-e artist Yoshitoshi

Zhong You is one of the Twenty-four Confucian paragons of filial piety. According to legend, he was from a poor family and often foraged wild greens to feed himself, but he would carry rice from more than 100 li away for his parents. When he grew up and became an important official, his parents had already died. He lived a life of luxury, but pined for the days of his youth. He often sighed: "How I wish I could return to the old days, when I ate wild greens and carried rice for my parents!"

In Confucian temples, Zhong You's spirit tablet is placed fourth among the Twelve Wise Ones, on the east.

During the Tang dynasty, Emperor Xuanzong posthumously awarded Zhong You the nobility title of Marquis of Wey (衛侯). During the Song dynasty, he was further awarded the titles of Duke of Henei (河內公) and Duke of Wey (衛公).

Zhong You's offspring held the title of Wujing Boshi (五經博士; Wǔjīng Bóshì).
