= Wey (state) =

Chinese state (c. 1040 BCE–209 BCE)

Wei 衛
- c. 1040 BCE – 221 BCE
- Zhou dynasty in the 5th century BCE
- Status: Duchy
- Capital: Zhaoge (c. 1040–661 BCE); Chuqiu (659–629 BCE); Diqiu (629–241 BCE); Yewang (241–221 BCE)
- Religion: Chinese folk religion ancestor worship
- Government: Monarchy
- History
  - Establishment of Zhou dynasty: c. 1040 BCE
  - Annexed by Qin: 221 BCE

Wey
- "Wey" in seal script (top), Traditional (middle), and Simplified (bottom) Chinese characters
- Traditional Chinese: 衞
- Simplified Chinese: 卫
Transcriptions
Standard Mandarin
- Hanyu Pinyin: Wèi
- Gwoyeu Romatzyh: Wey
- Wade–Giles: Wei^{4}
- IPA: [wêɪ]
Yue: Cantonese
- Yale Romanization: Waih
- Jyutping: Wai^{6}
- IPA: [wɐj˨]
Southern Min
- Tâi-lô: Uē
Middle Chinese
- Middle Chinese: Hjüèi
Old Chinese
- Baxter–Sagart (2014): *[ɢ]ʷ(r)a[t]-s

Wei (/weɪ/; Chinese: 衞; pinyin: Wèi), commonly spelled Wey to distinguish from the contemporary larger Wei (魏) state, was an ancient Chinese state that was founded in the early Western Zhou dynasty and rose to prominence during the Spring and Autumn period. Its rulers were of the surname Ji (姬), the same as that of the rulers of Zhou. It was located in modern northeastern Henan Province, east of Jin (and later Wei 魏), and west of Cao.

== Early history ==
The history of Wey dates back to the beginning of the Zhou dynasty and the Rebellion of the Three Guards. After the Duke of Zhou successfully defeated the rebellion, Kang Shu, a younger brother of King Wu of Zhou was given a fief centred on Zhaoge, the capital of the Shang dynasty, which had been the centre of the rebellion.

== Spring and Autumn period ==
The State of Wey was at its peak during the early Spring and Autumn period, under Duke Wu of Wey, who reigned for 55 years. In the reign of subsequent rulers, however, the state was plagued by succession troubles, until Duke Yi of Wey took the throne; his dissolute rule and obsession with cranes weakened the state, and in the eighth year of his reign the Rong peoples successfully attacked the capital at Zhaoge, killing the Duke and nearly destroying the state as well (660 BCE). It was only with the aid of Duke Huan of Qi that the state was eventually restored, with its capital moved to Chuqiu.

In 632 BCE Wey was conquered by Duke Wen of Jin, because when Duke Wen (called Chong'er then) was exiled to Wey, Duke Wen of Wey hadn't treated him well, and Duke Cheng of Wey, the son of Duke Wen of Wey, was nearly poisoned by Duke Wen of Jin, but eventually the state was restored. (Before the Battle of Chengpu, when Chu was attacking Song, Jin attacked Wey and Cao as a diversion.)

In 492 BCE Duke Chu of Wey (出公) succeeded the throne from his grandfather Duke Ling (灵公), while his father Kuaikui (蒯聩), who was the heir of Duke Ling, had been deposed and exiled. To get the throne, Kuaikui fought against his own son and managed to exile Duke Chu in 481 BCE, and was titled as Duke Zhuang II (后庄公), but was killed three years later. Duke Chu was restored in 475 BCE. The conflict between father and son weakened Wey, and Wey soon became attached to the House of Zhao of Jin.

== Downfall and end ==
During the Warring States period, Wey steadily declined due to internal strife and pressure from neighbors, especially Wei.

In 346 BCE, the duke of Wey degraded his title to marquis (侯). By 320 BCE, the ruler further downgraded to jun (君, lord), and Wey controlled only the county of Puyang (濮陽).

In 254 BCE, King Anxi of Wei killed Lord Huai of Wey (衛懷君). Two years later (252 BCE), Wei installed its son-in-law (from the Wey house) as Lord Yuan of Wey (衛元君), making Wey a dependency of Wei.

In 241 BCE (year 6 of King Zheng of Qin's reign), Qin captured Puyang during its attack on Wei, incorporating it into the new Dong Commandery. Wey's ruler was relocated to Yewang (野王), and a Ji clan member was appointed as Lord Jiao of Wey (衛君角). Wey survived nominally as a Qin vassal with no real independence.

Traditional account (per Shiji): Wey was overlooked during Qin Shi Huang's unification in 221 BCE due to its insignificance. It endured until 209 BCE (year 1 of Qin Er Shi), when Qin Er Shi deposed Lord Jiao, extinguishing Wey's line shortly before Qin's fall.

Modern scholarly revision: Japanese historian Hirase Takao (平勢隆郎) argued in his New Chronological Table of the Eastern Zhou in Shiji (1995) that Shiji contains a ~12-year systematic error from calendrical differences (Qin's immediate-year accession vs. eastern states' next-year accession). Cross-checked with excavated sources like Shuihudi Qin bamboo slips and Tsinghua Xinian, Lord Jiao's reign ended in 221 BCE, coinciding with Qin's conquest of Qi and full unification. Wey thus fell with the other states. This view is supported by Chinese scholar Zhou Zhenhe (周振鶴) and resolves chronological inconsistencies.

== Vassals ==
Vassals of Wey include Shi clan, Ning clan, Kong clan, Beigong clan, Nan clan and Sun clan. They were mostly cadet branches of Wey. Kong clan, which came from the state of Nan Yan, was an exception.

== List of rulers ==
Wey state

adoption
unknown descent
^{(1)} Kang Shu 衛康叔
^{(2)} Count Kang 衛康伯
^{(3)} Count Kao 衛考伯
^{(4)} Count Si 衛嗣伯
^{(5)} Count Zhi 衞摯伯
^{(6)} Count Jing 衛靖伯
^{(7)} Count Zhen 衛貞伯	□
^{(8)} Marquis Qing 衛頃侯 ?- 867- 855 BC	Shi Que 石碏; Shi clan 石氏
^{(9)} Marquis Xi 衛僖侯 ?- 855- 813 BC
^{(10)} Count Gong 衛共伯 ?- 813 BC BC	^{(11)} Duke Wu 衛武公; 852- 813- 758 BC
^{(12)} Duke Zhuang I 衛莊公 ?- 758- 735 BC	Huisun 惠孫; Sun clan 孫氏	Jiwei 季亹; Ning clan 甯氏
Count Xiao 孝伯	^{(13)} Duke Huan 衛桓公 ?- 735- 719 BC	^{(14)} Zhouyu 州吁 ?- 719 BC	^{(15)} Duke Xuan 衛宣公 ?- 719- 700 BC	Yougongzi Zhi (Note: Gōngzǐ (Chinese: 公子; lit. 'The Lord's Son') is a title attached to the sons of a ruler.) (Note: Yòugōngzǐ (Chinese: 右公子; lit. 'The Lord's Son of the Right') indicates the title holder being a son of a ruler.) 右公子職 ?- 688 BC	Zuogongzi Xie (Note: Zuǒgōngzǐ (Chinese: 左公子; lit. 'The Lord's Son of the Left') indicates the title holder being a son of a ruler.) 左公子洩 ?- 688 BC
Viscount Ji 急子 ?- 701 BC	^{(17)} Gongzi Qianmou 公子黔牟 ?- 696- 688 BC	Count Zhao 昭伯	Viscount Shou 壽子 ?- 701 BC	^{(16)} Duke Hui 衛惠公; 714- 700- 696- 688- 669 BC
Viscount Qi 齊子	^{(19)} Duke Dai 衛戴公 ?- 660 BC	^{(20)} Duke Wen 衛文公 ?- 660- 635 BC	^{(18)} Duke Yi 衛懿公 ?- 669- 660 BC
□ Qi clan 齊氏	^{(21)} Duke Cheng 衛成公 ?- 635- 632- 630- 600 BC	Shu Wu 叔武 ?- 632 BC	^{(22)} Gongzi He 公子瑕 ?- 632- 630 BC	Ziyi 子儀 ?- 630 BC
^{(23)} Duke Mu 衛穆公 ?- 600- 589 BC	Viscount Qing 頃子; Beigong clan 北宮氏
^{(24)} Duke Ding 衛定公 ?- 589- 577 BC	Zishu Heibei 子叔黑背
^{(25)} Duke Xian 衛獻公 ?- 577- 559- 547- 544 BC	Gongzi Zhuan 公子鱄	Viscount Zhan 子展	^{(26)} Duke Shang 衛殤公 ?- 559- 547 BC	□
^{(27)} Duke Xiang 衛襄公 ?- 544- 535 BC	Dang, Viscount of Cheng 成子當; Gongshu clan 公叔氏	Gongzi Jing 公子荊	Taizi Jiao (Note: Tàizǐ (Chinese: 太子; lit. 'The (Lord's) Heir Apparent') indicates the title holder being the eldest son of a ruler.) 太子角 ?- 547 BC	Xi Zhuchu 析朱鉏; Xi clan 析氏
Gongmeng Zhi 公孟縶 ?- 522 BC; Gongmeng clan 公孟氏	^{(28)} Duke Ling 衛靈公; 540- 535- 493 BC	□
Gongmeng Kou 公孟彄	^{(30)} Duke Zhuang II 衛莊公 ?- 479- 478 BC	^{(32)} Gongzi Qi 公子起 ?- 478- 477 BC-?	^{(33)} Duke Dao 衛悼公 ?- 456- 451 BC	Gongzi Ying 公子郢; Nan clan 南氏	^{(31)} Gongsun Banshi (Note: Gōngsūn (Chinese: 公孫; lit. 'The Lord's Grandson') is a title attached to the paternal grandsons of a ruler. In two instances above, Gongsun Banshi was a grandson of Duke Xiang, while Gongsun Mimou was a grandson of Duke Ling. If a person was also a son of a ruler, the title Gōngzǐ (公子) was used instead.) 公孫斑師 ?- 478 BC-?
^{(29)} Duke Chu 衛出公 ?- 493- 480- 477- 456 BC	Taizi Ji 太子疾 ?- 478 BC	Gongzi Qing 公子青 ?- 478 BC	^{(34)} Duke Jing 衛敬公 ?- 451- 432 BC	Gongsun Mimou 公孫彌牟	Sikou Huizi 司寇惠子; Sikou clan 司寇氏
^{(35)} Duke Zhao 衛昭公 ?- 432- 426 BC	Gongzi Shi 公子適	Jianzi He 簡子瑕	Hu 虎
^{(36)} Duke Huai 衛懷公 ?- 426- 415 BC	^{(37)} Duke Shen 衛慎公 ?- 415- 383 BC
^{(38)} Duke Sheng 衛聲公 ?- 383- 372 BC
^{(39)} Marquis Cheng 衛成侯 ?- 372- 343 BC
^{(40)} Marquis Ping 衛平侯 ?- 343- 335 BC
^{(41)} Lord Si 衛嗣君 ?- 335- 293 BC
^{(42)} Lord Huai 衛懷君 ?- 293- 252 BC	^{(43)} Lord Yuan 衛元君 ?- 252- 242 BC	^{(44)} Jiao 衛君角 ?- 242- 209 BC

== See also ==
- Wei River, a tributary of the Grand Canal named for the former state
