= Yanhu (disambiguation) =

Yanhu District is the main district of Yuncheng, Shanxi, China.

Yánhú (盐湖) may also refer to:

- Yanhu Township, Gê'gyai County, Tibet AR
- Bai Yanhu (died 1881), Hui military commander and rebel

== See also ==
- Yan Hui (disambiguation)
- Huyan
