= Yen Lu =

Yen Lu may refer to:

- Yan Wuyou, also known as Yan Lu/Yen Lu
- Lu Yen, Taiwanese composer
