= Yan Hui (disambiguation) =

Yan Hui (c. 521–481 BC) was the favorite disciple of Confucius.

Yan Hui may also refer to:

- Yan Hui (painter) (fl. late 13th century), Chinese brushstroke artist
- Yan Hui (curler) (born 1995), Chinese medalist in 2017 Pacific-Asia Championships

== See also ==
- Yan Hui Temple in Qufu, dedicated to favorite disciple of Confucius
