= Zitong =

Zitong may refer to:

- Zitong County (梓潼县), a county in Sichuan Province, China
- Zitong (dictionary) (字通), a Song-dynasty Chinese dictionary
