= Gê'gyai Town =

Geji 革吉镇
- Town
- Location within Tibet
- Coordinates: 32°23′43.6″N 81°08′23.0″E
- Country: China
- Autonomous region: Tibetan Autonomous Region
- Preferecture: Ngari Prefecture
- County: Gê'gyai County

Gê'gyai (Tibetan: དགེ་རྒྱས་།), also translated as Geji (simplified Chinese: 革吉镇; traditional Chinese: 革吉鎮; pinyin: Géjí zhèn), is a town on the Tibetan Plateau in Gê'gyai County in Ngari Prefecture of the Tibet Autonomous Region of China. The Debo La mountain pass exists from Gejizhen to Xiongba Township, and the road is entirely unpaved.

== Administrative divisions ==
Geji administers the following two residential communities (Chinese: 社区; pinyin: Shèqū) and five administrative villages (Chinese: 行政村; pinyin: Xíngzhèng Cūn):

- Napu Community (Chinese: 那普社区)
- Fukang Community (Chinese: 福康社区)
- Bugong Village (Chinese: 布贡村)
- Kangbalie Village (Chinese: 康巴列村)
- Senbu Village (Chinese: 森布村)
- Gongqian Village (Chinese: 公前村)
- Mangla Village (Chinese: 芒拉村)

== See also ==
- List of populated places in the Tibet Autonomous Region
- List of villages in China
