= Gê'gyai County =

Gê'gyai County 革吉县 • དགེ་རྒྱས་རྫོང་།
- County
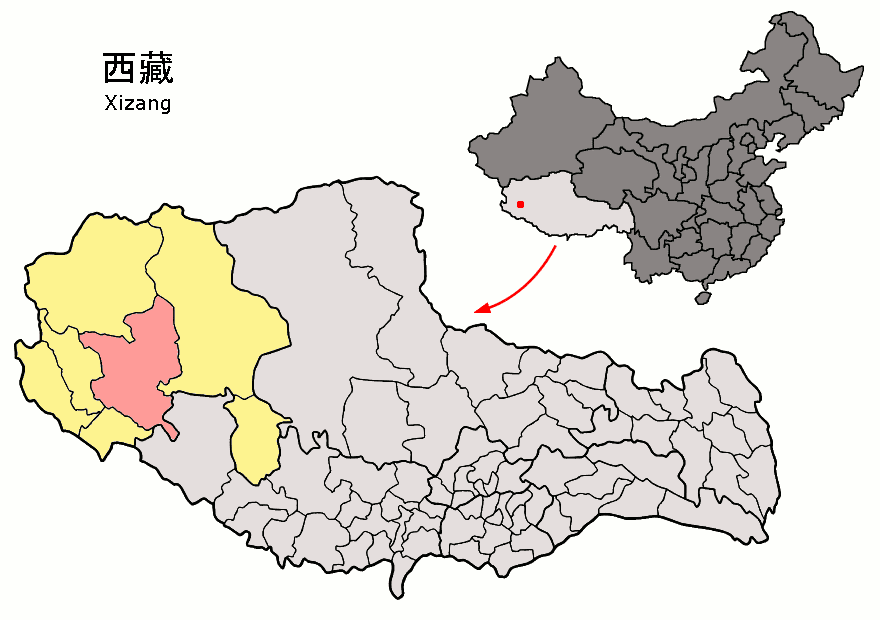
- Location of Gê'gyai County (red) within Ngari Prefecture (yellow) and the Tibet Autonomous Region

- Location of the seat in the Tibet Autonomous Region Gê'gyai (Tibet) Gê'gyai (China)
- Coordinates: 32.393°N 81.140°E
- Country: China
- Autonomous region: Tibet
- Prefecture: Ngari
- County seat: Gê'gyai

Area
  - Total: 46,104.28 km^{2} (17,800.96 sq mi)

Population (2020)
  - Total: 18,012
  - Density: 0.39068/km^{2} (1.0119/sq mi)
- Time zone: UTC+8 (China Standard)
- Website: gj.al.gov.cn

Gê'gyai County

Chinese name
- Simplified Chinese: 革吉县
- Traditional Chinese: 革吉縣
Transcriptions
Standard Mandarin
- Hanyu Pinyin: Géjí Xiàn

Tibetan name
- Tibetan: དགེ་རྒྱས་རྫོང་།
Transcriptions
- Wylie: dge rgyas rdzong
- Tibetan Pinyin: Gê'gyai Zong

Gê'gyai County (Tibetan: དགེ་རྒྱས་རྫོང་།, Chinese: 革吉县) is a county in Ngari Prefecture of the Tibet Autonomous Region, China. 'Gê'gyai' is Tibetan for "full beauty".

== Geography ==
Lakes in the county include Argog Co, Bero Zeco, Chagcam Caka, Chali Co, Donggu Co, Nau Co, Nyêr Co, and Sêkazhig Co.

== Administrative divisions ==
Gê'gyai county is divided into 1 town and 4 townships:

Name	Chinese	Hanyu Pinyin	Tibetan	Wylie
Town
Gê'gyai Town	革吉镇	Géjí zhèn	དགེ་རྒྱས་གྲོང་རྡལ།	dge rgyas grong rdal
Townships
Zhungpa Township	雄巴乡	Xióngbā xiāng	གཞུང་པ་ཤང་།	gzhung pa shang
Yagra Township	亚热乡	Yàrè xiāng	ཡག་རྭ་ཤང་།	yag rwa shang
Chaco Township (Yanhu)	盐湖乡	Yánhú xiāng	ཚྭ་མཚོ་ཤང་།	tshwa mtsho shang
Wönpo Tamzang Township	文布当桑乡	Wénbùdāngsāng xiāng	བོན་པོ་གཏམ་བཟང་ཤང་།	bon po gtam bzang shang

== Demography ==
Population of this district was 12,313 inhabitants in 1999.
