= Yan Silu =

Chinese minister

- Traditional Chinese: 顏思魯
- Simplified Chinese: 颜思鲁
Transcriptions
Standard Mandarin
- Hanyu Pinyin: Yán Sī Lǔ
Yue: Cantonese
- Jyutping: Ngaan^{4} Si^{1} Lou^{5}

Courtesy name
- Traditional Chinese: 孔歸
- Simplified Chinese: 孔归
Transcriptions
Standard Mandarin
- Hanyu Pinyin: Kǒng Guī
Yue: Cantonese
- Jyutping: Hung^{2} Gwai^{1}

Yan Silu (simplified Chinese: 颜思鲁; traditional Chinese: 顏思魯), courtesy name Kong Gui (simplified Chinese: 孔归; traditional Chinese: 孔歸), was a Chinese minister of the Sui dynasty and the Tang dynasty. He was a native of Linyi, Langya Commandery.

== Background ==
Yan Silu is the son of Yan Zhitui. He is a native of Linyi, Langya Commandery. Yan wrote the preface to his father's anthology. He was born in Jiangling and moved to Dunhuafang, Chang'an, Jingzhao in the early Sui Dynasty. Yan was the elder brother of Yan Minchu and Yan Youqin.

Skilled in producing compositions, Yan was particularly good at exegesis and was a scholar of Confucianism. The historian of education Shen Guanqun praised Yan for being "erudite and good at writing". On the topic of scripture meanings, Yan engaged Liu Zhen in a debate. In the Sui dynasty, he served as a secretary for the Department of Economics and was a scholar of the Eastern Palace. Yan also served as attendant to the prince Yang Yan, the son of Yang Yong. At the beginning of the Tang dynasty, he joined the army in a clerk role. Yan was chosen to be an assistant during the reign of Emperor Taizong of Tang and later received a general title (Chinese: 踰岷將軍).

Yan married the daughter of the doctor Yin Yingtong (Chinese: 殷英童). The book "Yin Yingtong Collection" (殷英童集) refers to a "Yan son-in-law", which is him. Over 20 of Yan's songs and poems are included in the collection.
