= Ganlu Zishu =

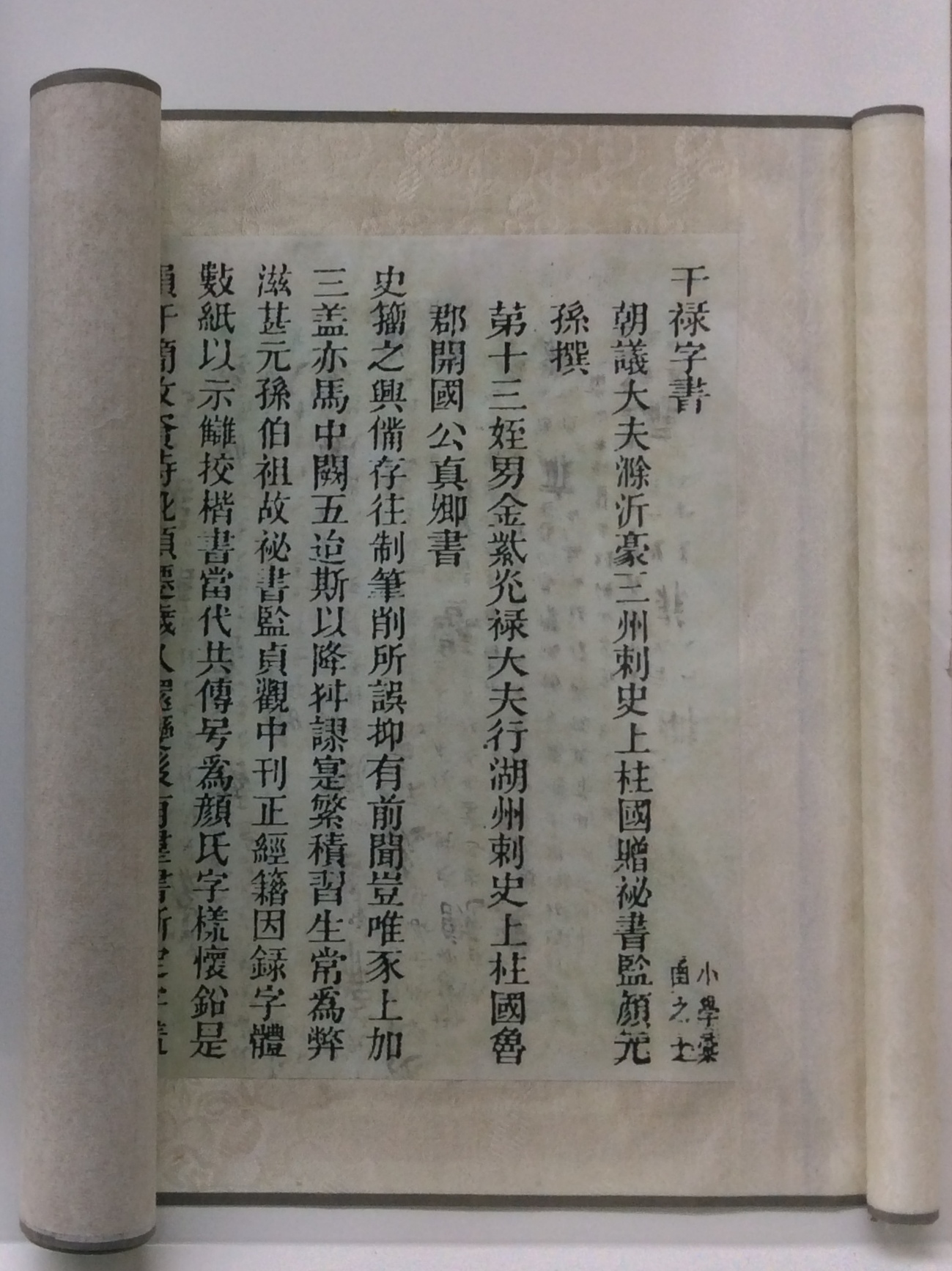
Ganlu Zishu in the Chinese Dictionary Museum, Jincheng, Shanxi

Ganlu Zishu (Chinese: 干祿字書; pinyin: Gànlù zìshū; Wade–Giles: Kan^{4}-lu^{4} tzŭ^{4}-shu^{1}; lit. 'Character Book for Seeking an Official Emolument') is a Chinese orthography dictionary of the Tang dynasty. The first surviving orthographical dictionary for the regular script, it was authored by Yan Yuansun (顏元孫), a descendant of the famous scholar Yan Shigu. It is roughly based on Yan Shigu's work Ziyang (字樣 "Character Samples"), now surviving only in fragments. It was meant to be an official guide for the use of those who took the Imperial examination, thus the title "Ganlu", an allusion to the Analects (2:18).

The work comprises about 800 characters (excluding variants). The characters are collated by tone and rime (approximately those used in Qieyun). The variants of a character are divided into three types: the "standard" (正 zheng), the "acceptable" (通 tong) and the "vulgar" (俗 su). Not every character has all the three types of variant. The examinees were supposed to use the "standard" form of a character.

The text was carved on stone with the calligraphy of Yan Zhenqing, nephew of Yan Yuansun. The stone has worn out, though.

== See also ==
- Zitong dictionary, a Song dynasty orthography dictionary
