= Nyer Tso =

Nyer Tso / Nie'er Cuo
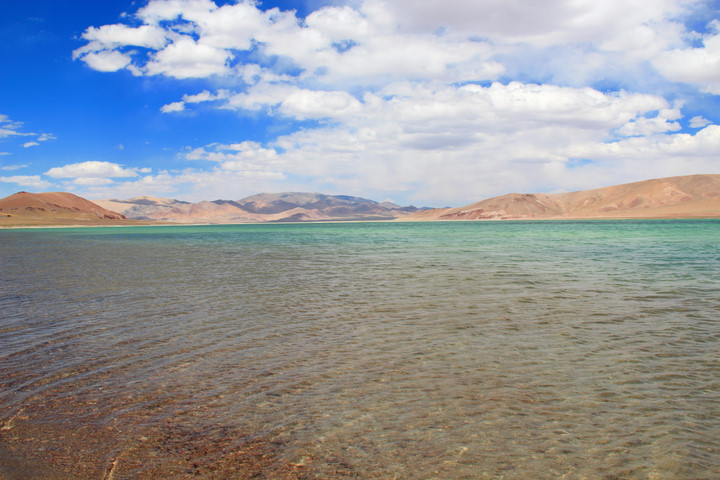

- Location within Ngari
- Coordinates: 32°17′N 82°13′E
- Type: Salt lake
- Basin countries: China
- Max. length: 10.9 km (7 mi)
- Max. width: 3.5 km (2 mi)
- Surface area: 33 km^{2} (0 sq mi)
- Surface elevation: 4,399 m (14,432 ft)

Nyer Lake (Tibetan: ཉེར་མཚོ, Wylie: nyer mtsho; Chinese: 聂尔错; pinyin: Niè'ěr Cuò) is a plateau lake in Gê'gyai County, Tibet Autonomous Region, southwest of China. The lake has a total area of about 33 square kilometers. Lying nearly 4,399 metres above sea level.

== Economics ==
Nyer Lake is a salt lake. Tibet Mineral Development (SZSE: 000762) owns a license to extract boron and magnesium from the lake since 2008. However, the company has not done so deeming it not yet economical.
