= Yan Wuyou =

Disciple of Confucius (born c. 545 BC)

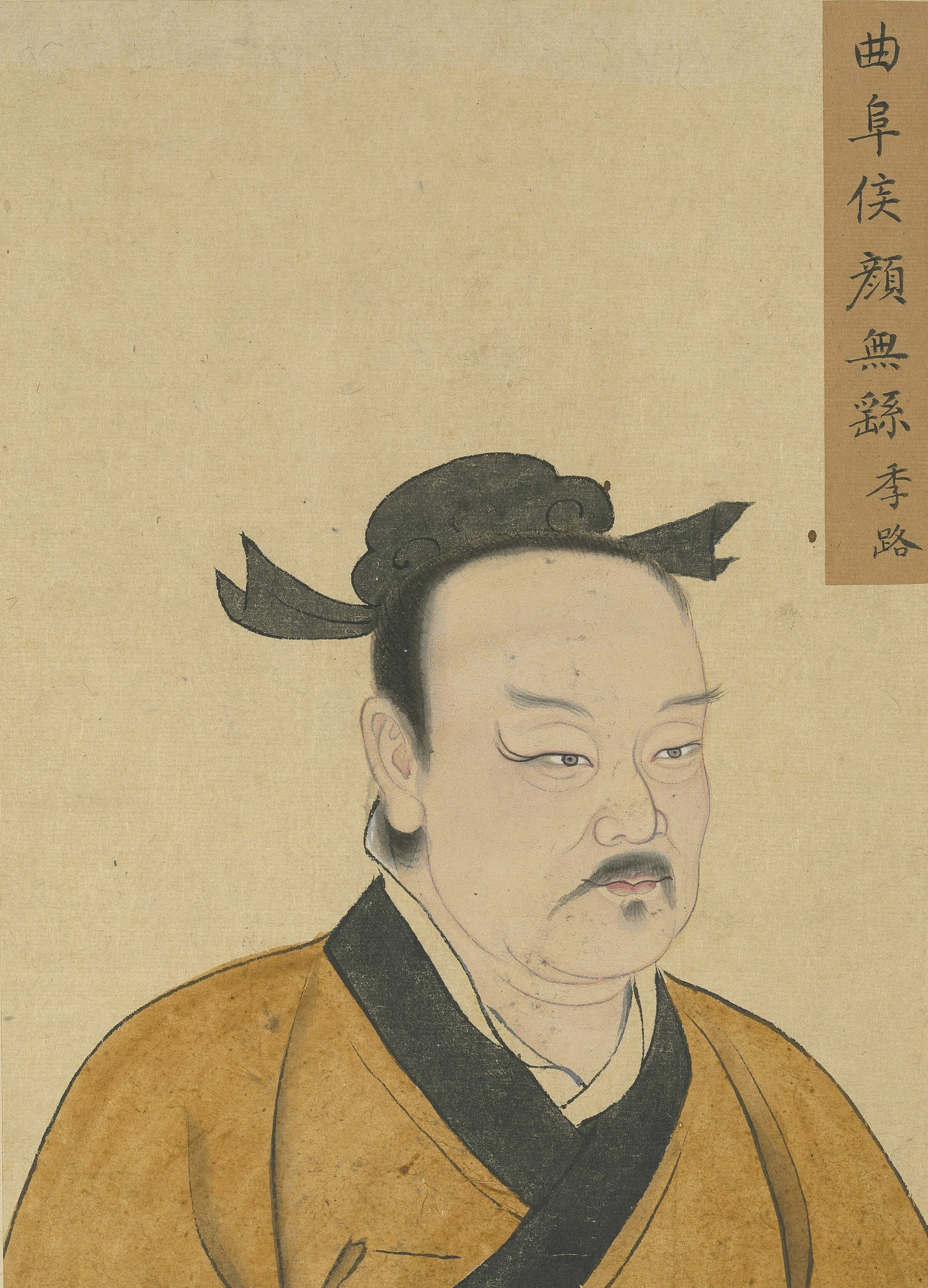
Yuan Dynasty depiction of Yan Wuyou

Yan Wuyou (Chinese: 顏無繇; Wade–Giles: Yen Wu-yu; born 545 BC), courtesy name Lu (路), also known as Yan Lu (Chinese: 顏路; Wade–Giles: Yen Lu), was a Chinese philosopher. He was one of the earliest disciples of Confucius. He was the father of Yan Hui, Confucius' favourite disciple.

== Life ==
Yan Wuyou was born in 545 BC, only six years younger than Confucius. He was born in the State of Lu, Confucius' native state.

When his son Yan Hui died in 481 BC, Yan Wuyou asked Confucius to sell his carriage to buy an exterior coffin for Yan Hui. Although Yan Hui was Confucius' favourite disciple who he mourned greatly, Confucius insisted on adhering to ritual proprieties. He said as a member of the shi class, Yan Hui was to be buried with a single layer of coffin, and that was how he buried his own son, Kong Li. Confucius added that as a member of the dafu (minister) class, it was ritually improper for him to walk on foot for official business.

== Honours ==
In Confucian temples, Yan Wuyou's spirit tablet is placed in the hall of Confucius' ancestors, opposite that of Zeng Dian.

During the Tang dynasty, Emperor Xuanzong posthumously awarded Yan Wuyou the nobility title of Count of Qi (杞伯) in 739. During the Song dynasty, he was further awarded the title of Marquis of Qufu (曲阜侯) in 1009. In 1332, during the Yuan dynasty, he was made Duke of Qi (杞国公).

== Bibliography ==
- Han, Zhaoqi (2010). "Biographies of the Disciples of Confucius". Shiji (史记) (in Chinese). Beijing: Zhonghua Book Company. ISBN 978-7-101-07272-3.
- Huang, Chichung, ed. (1997). The Analects of Confucius. Oxford University Press. ISBN 978-0-19-506157-4.
- Huang, Yong (2013). Confucius: A Guide for the Perplexed. A&C Black. ISBN 978-1-4411-9653-8.
- Legge, James (2009). The Confucian Analects, the Great Learning & the Doctrine of the Mean. Cosimo. ISBN 978-1-60520-644-8.
