= Zitong (dictionary) =

1204 Chinese orthographic dictionary

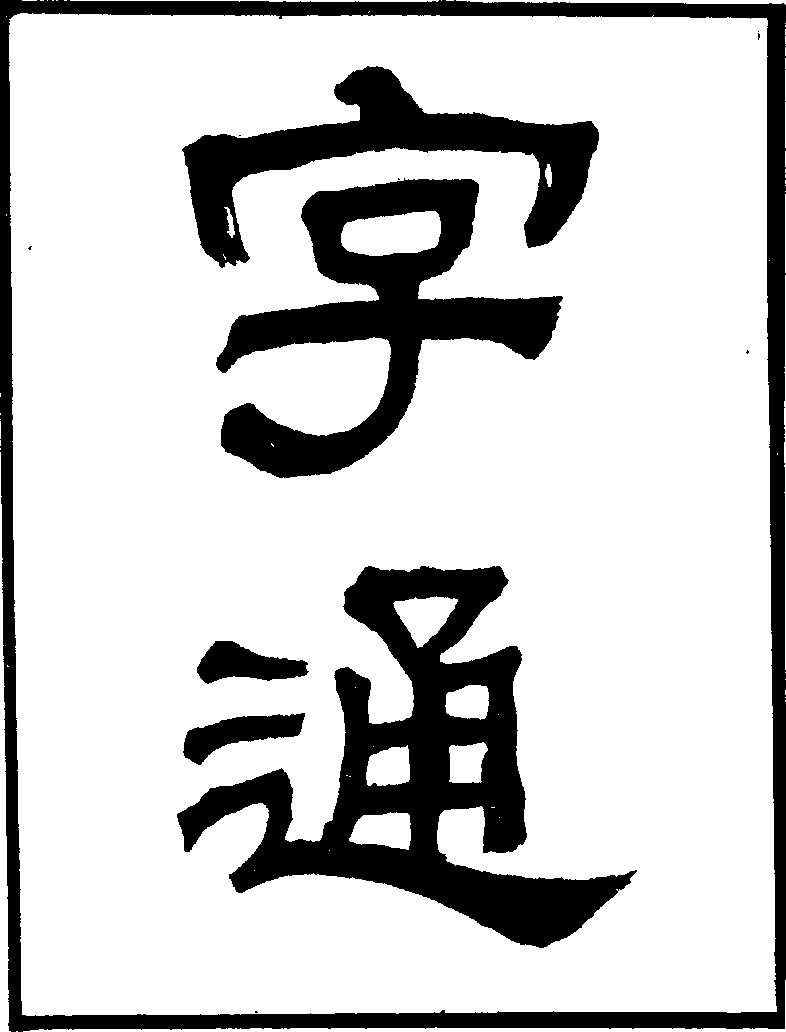
- Zitong title page in clerical script

Chinese name
- Chinese: 字通
- Literal meaning: character mastery
Transcriptions
Standard Mandarin
- Hanyu Pinyin: Zìtōng
- Wade–Giles: Tzu-t'ung
Yue: Cantonese
- Jyutping: Zi4 tung1
Southern Min
- Hokkien POJ: Jīthong
Middle Chinese
- Middle Chinese: Dzithuwng

Korean name
- Hangul: 字通
- Hanja: 자통
Transcriptions
- McCune–Reischauer: Chat'ong

Japanese name
- Kanji: 字通
Transcriptions
- Revised Hepburn: Jitsū

The Zitong is a 1254 Chinese dictionary of that was compiled by the Southern Song dynasty (1127–1279) scholar Li Congzhou 李從周. It discussed orthographic differences between Chinese characters written in different historical styles, including seal script, clerical script, and the contemporary regular script.

== Title ==
The title combines two common words: zì 字 "character; script; writing; graph; style" and tōng 通 "communicate/connect (with); join; understand thoroughly; master". While the title is usually transliterated as Zitong or Tzu-t'ung, English translations are Summary of Characters, General Dictionary of Chinese Characters, and (A Scholar) Versed in Characters.

Li Congzhou's choice of title was the name of an earlier character dictionary that is now a lost work: the (c. 500) Zitong 字通 by Yang Chengqing 楊承慶 of the Northern Wei dynasty. It contained 13,734 character head entries, which was more than the (c. 350) Zilin with 12,824 entries. Yang's Zitong has been partially reconstructed from fragments of early texts and quotations in classical texts.

The similarly titled (1671) Zhengzitong 正字通 "Correct Character Mastery" (with zhèng 正 "right; straight; correct") was published by Qing dynasty scholar Liao Wenying 廖文英, who bought and renamed the (1627) Zihui bian 字彙辯 "Zihui Disputations", which was written by the Ming dynasty author Zhang Zilie 張自烈 as a supplement to the (1615) Zihui dictionary.

Furthermore, the Japanese lexicographer Shirakawa Shizuka 白川静 edited an identically titled (1996) Jitsū 字通 "Mastery of Characters" Japanese dictionary.

== History ==
In an alphabetic language like English, orthography means "Correct or proper spelling; spelling according to accepted usage; the way in which words are conventionally written. (By extension) Any mode or system of spelling." (OED 2009, v. 4.0). When semantically extended into a logographic language like Chinese, it means "the way in which Chinese characters are conventionally written", which includes calligraphic aspects such as the script styles, stroke order, and character structure.

The first Chinese orthographic dictionaries, or "'character model' dictionaries", were compiled during the Tang dynasty (618–907) in an effort to rectify discrepancies among characters written in seal, clerical, and regular scripts, and to standardize variant characters. Emperor Taizong of Tang put the scholar and calligrapher Yan Shigu (581–645) in charge of the Palace Library in order to "verify and authorize" the Five Classics. The Archival Bureau's duties were to print authoritative editions of the classic works, to collate the styles of characters, to check and proofread government texts, and to produce a standard orthographic handbook. This became the first Chinese orthographic dictionary, Yan Shigu's book the Zìyàng 字樣 "Character Models" (aka Yanshi ziyang 顏氏字樣 "Mr. Yan's Character Models") gave model samples of writing characters in different scripts, which his grandson Yan Yuansun 顏元孫 (d. 732) used as the basis for his Ganlu Zishu orthographic dictionary.

In addition to the Zitong, various orthography dictionaries and character books were published during the Song dynasty (960–1279), for instance, the Fugubian 复古編 "Return to Old Chapters" by Zhang You 張有 and the Peixi 佩觿 "Ivory Bodkin" by the painter Guo Zhongshu.

== Text ==
The Zitong was in one volume, and based upon the classic (121) Shuowen jiezi character dictionary. It included 601 character head entries, which were arranged into 89 sections according to the number of strokes in the regular script. The head character was in seal script and entries were in regular script, giving notation first, followed by the definition. All the exegetic interpretations quote the Shuowen jiezi without any other sources.

There were flaws in the Zitong, such as listing some characters twice and inconsistencies in the 89-radical system. It did have a useful appendix with 82 popular erroneous writings, such as yīchang 衣常 instead of yīshang 衣裳 "clothing; clothes". Nevertheless, this dictionary was important for the study of lexicographical theories concerning dictionary compilation in the Song Dynasty.
