= Zeng Dian =

Disciple of Confucius (born 546 BC)

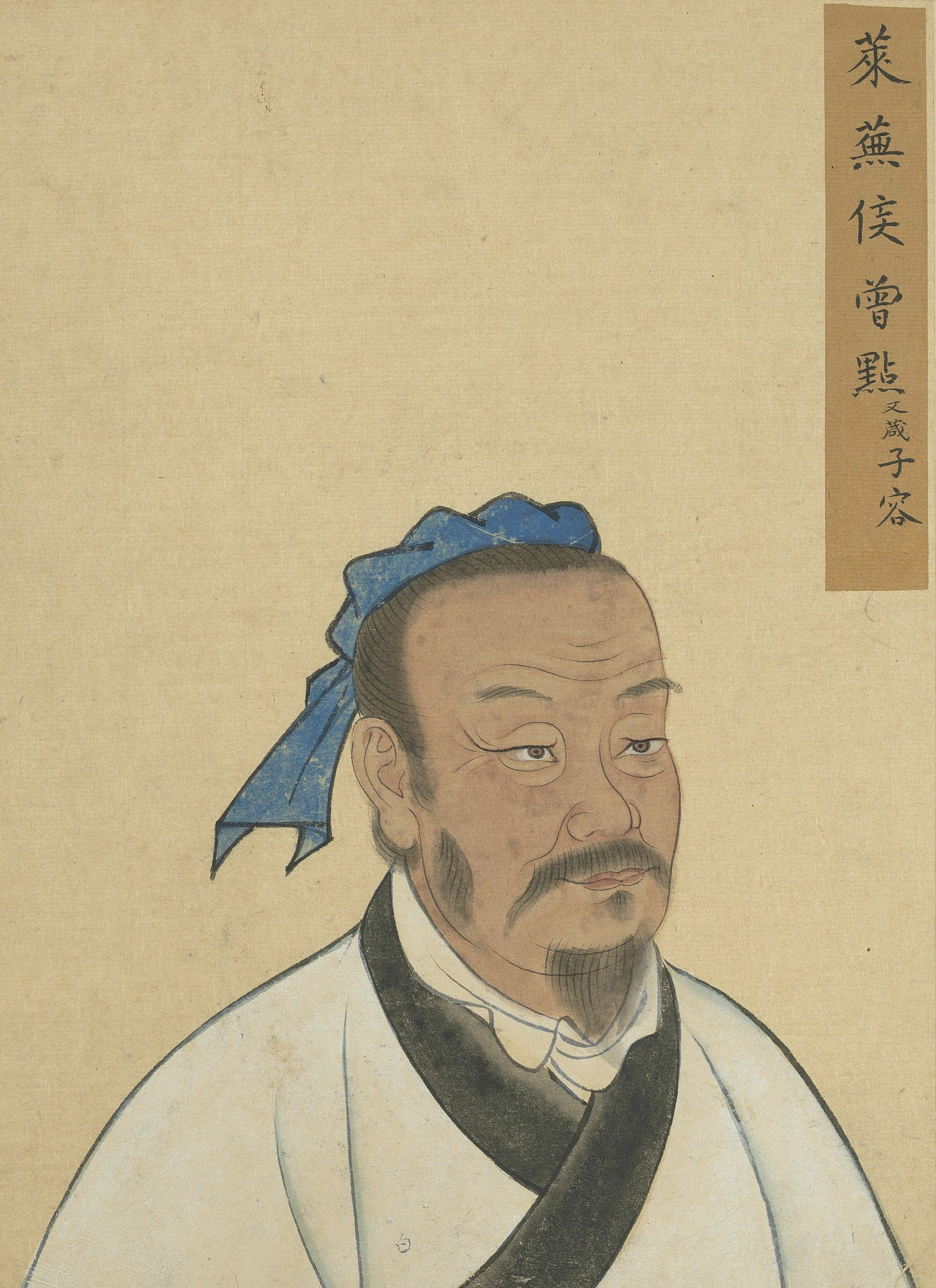
Yuan Dynasty depiction of Zeng Dian

Zeng Dian (Chinese: 曾點/曾蒧; Wade–Giles: Tseng Tien; born 546 BC), courtesy name Zixi (Chinese: 子皙; Wade–Giles: Tzu-hsi), also known as Zeng Xi (Chinese: 曾皙; Wade–Giles: Tseng Hsi), was one of the earliest disciples of Confucius. He is known for a passage in the Analects in which he expressed his ambition as no more than being content with daily life. He was the father of Zeng Shen, or Master Zeng, one of the most prominent disciples of Confucius.

== Life ==
Zeng Dian was born in 546 BC, only five years younger than Confucius. He was a native of South Wu City in the State of Lu.

The Analects (11.26) records a famous conversation between Confucius, Zeng Dian, and three other disciples of the Master—Zilu, Ran You, and Zihua. Confucius asked his students to express their ambitions. Zilu said he wanted to govern a troubled state and turn it around, Ran You wanted to rule a territory and make it prosperous, while Zihua merely wished to be a competent official. When Confucius asked Zeng Dian, Zeng unhurriedly finished playing his zither, and said he wanted something different:

"At the end of spring, with the spring clothes already been finished, I would like, in the company of five or six young men and six or seven children, to cleanse ourselves in the Yi River, to revel in the cool breezes at the Altar for Rain, and then return home singing."

Unexpectedly, Confucius endorsed Zeng Dian's wish, rather than the moral and political ambitions of his other disciples. According to the interpretation of the influential philosophers Cheng Yi and Zhu Xi, this passage signifies Confucius' view that the mind of a real sage is at ease and not always worrying about the moral boundary, and is capable of enjoying an artistic way of life and celebrating the creations of Heaven.

== Son ==
Zeng Dian was the father of Zeng Shen, later known as Zengzi or Master Zeng, and revered as one of the Four Sages of Confucianism. When Zeng Shen was 16, Zeng Dian sent him to study under Confucius. Zeng Shen would later teach Confucius' grandson Zisi (Kong Ji), who was in turn the teacher of Mencius, thus beginning a line of transmitters of orthodox Confucian traditions.

Zeng Shen was famous for his filial piety. After the deaths of Zeng Dian and his wife, he was unable to read the rites of mourning without bursting into tears. His story is included in the Yuan dynasty text The Twenty-four Filial Exemplars.

The Lüshi Chunqiu records an anecdote of Zeng Dian and his son. When Zeng Shen did not return on time after going on a mission, many feared he might have died, but Zeng Dian said: "Though he may be in mortal danger, so long as I still survive how would he dare perish?"

== Honours ==
In Confucian temples, Zeng Dian's spirit tablet is placed in the hall of Confucius' ancestors.

During the Tang dynasty, Emperor Xuanzong posthumously awarded Zeng Dian the nobility title of Count of Su (宿伯). During the Song dynasty, he was further awarded the title of Marquis of Laiwu (萊蕪侯).

== Bibliography ==
- Han, Zhaoqi (2010). "Biographies of the Disciples of Confucius". Shiji 史记 (in Chinese). Beijing: Zhonghua Book Company. ISBN 978-7-101-07272-3.
- Huang, Chichung, ed. (1997). The Analects of Confucius. Oxford University Press. ISBN 978-0-19-506157-4.
- Legge, James (2009). The Confucian Analects, the Great Learning & the Doctrine of the Mean. Cosimo. ISBN 978-1-60520-644-8.
- Lü, Buwei; Knoblock, John; Riegel, Jeffrey K. (2000). Lü Shi Chun Qiu. Stanford University Press. ISBN 978-0-8047-6398-1.
- Shen, Vincent (2013). Dao Companion to Classical Confucian Philosophy. Springer Science & Business Media. ISBN 978-90-481-2936-2.
- Yu Dan (2009). Confucius from the Heart: Ancient Wisdom for Today's World. Simon and Schuster. ISBN 978-1-4165-9656-1.
