= Zengzi =

Chinese philosopher and disciple of Confucius (505–435 BC)

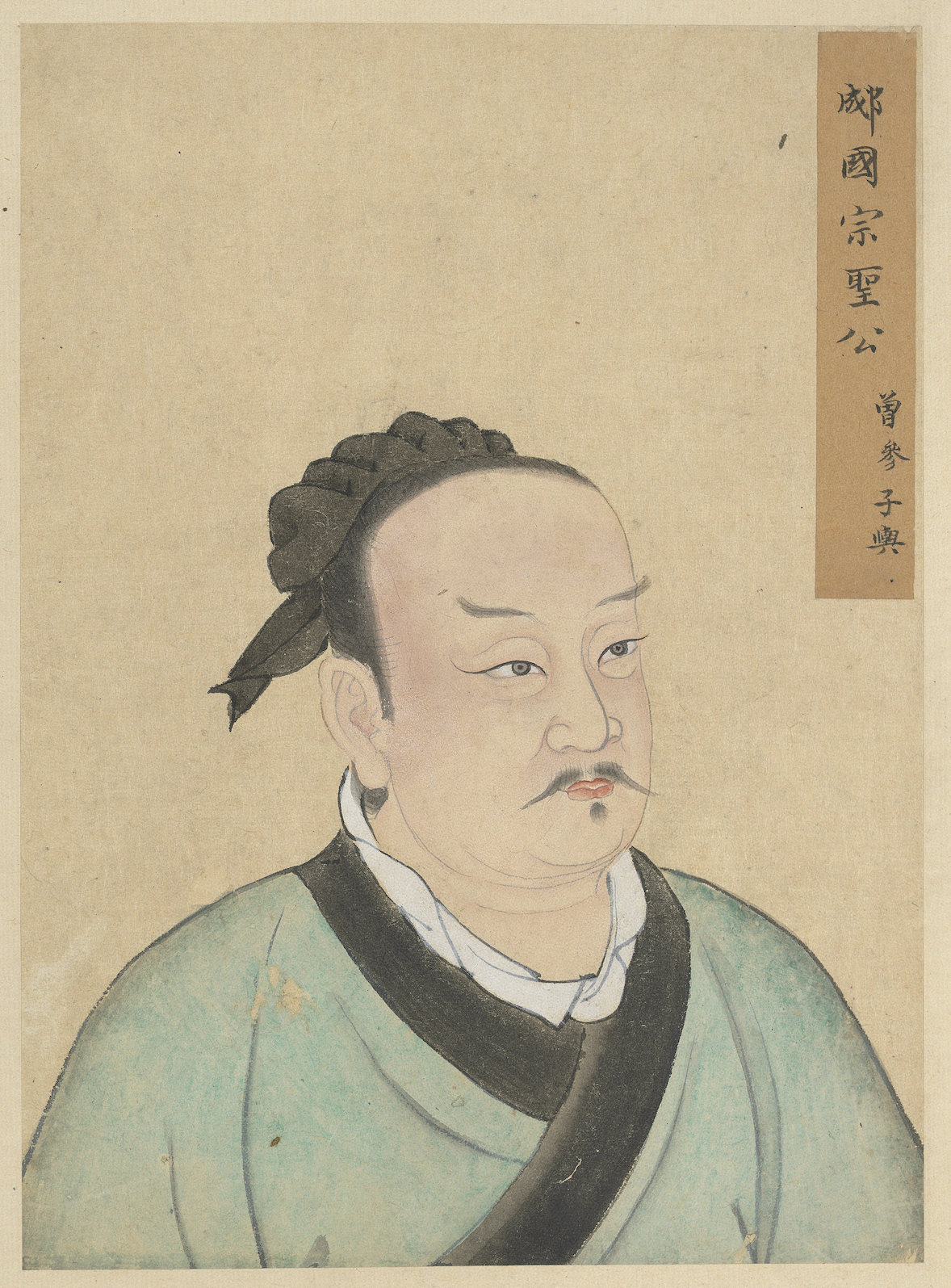
- As depicted in Half Portraits of the Great Sage and Virtuous Men of Old (至聖先賢半身像), housed in the National Palace Museum
- Chinese: 曾子
- Hanyu Pinyin: Zēngzǐ
- Literal meaning: "Master Zēng"
Transcriptions
Standard Mandarin
- Hanyu Pinyin: Zēngzǐ
- Bopomofo: ㄗㄥ ㄗˇ
- Gwoyeu Romatzyh: Tzengtzyy
- Wade–Giles: Tsêng^{1} Tzŭ^{3}
- Yale Romanization: Dzēngdž
- IPA: [tsə́ŋ.tsɹ̩̀]
Yue: Cantonese
- Yale Romanization: Jāngjí
- Jyutping: Zang1zi2
- IPA: [tsáŋ.tsǐ]
Southern Min
- Hokkien POJ: Chan-chú
- Tâi-lô: Tsan-tsú
Old Chinese
- Baxter–Sagart (2014): *[ts]ˤəŋ tsəʔ

Zeng Shen
- Traditional Chinese: 曾參
- Simplified Chinese: 曾参
- Hanyu Pinyin: Zēng Shēn
Transcriptions
Standard Mandarin
- Hanyu Pinyin: Zēng Shēn
- Bopomofo: ㄗㄥ ㄕㄣ
- Gwoyeu Romatzyh: Tzeng Shen
- Wade–Giles: Tsêng^{1} Shên^{1}
- Yale Romanization: Dzēng Shēn
- IPA: [tsə́ŋ ʂə́n]
Old Chinese
- Baxter–Sagart (2014): *[ts]ˤəŋ srum

Zeng Shen (505–435 BC), better known as Zengzi (Master Zeng), courtesy name Ziyu (子輿), was a Chinese philosopher and disciple of Confucius. He later taught Zisi (Kong Ji), the grandson of Confucius, who was in turn the teacher of Mencius, thus beginning a line of transmitters of orthodox Confucian traditions. He is revered as one of the Four Sages of Confucianism.

== Life ==
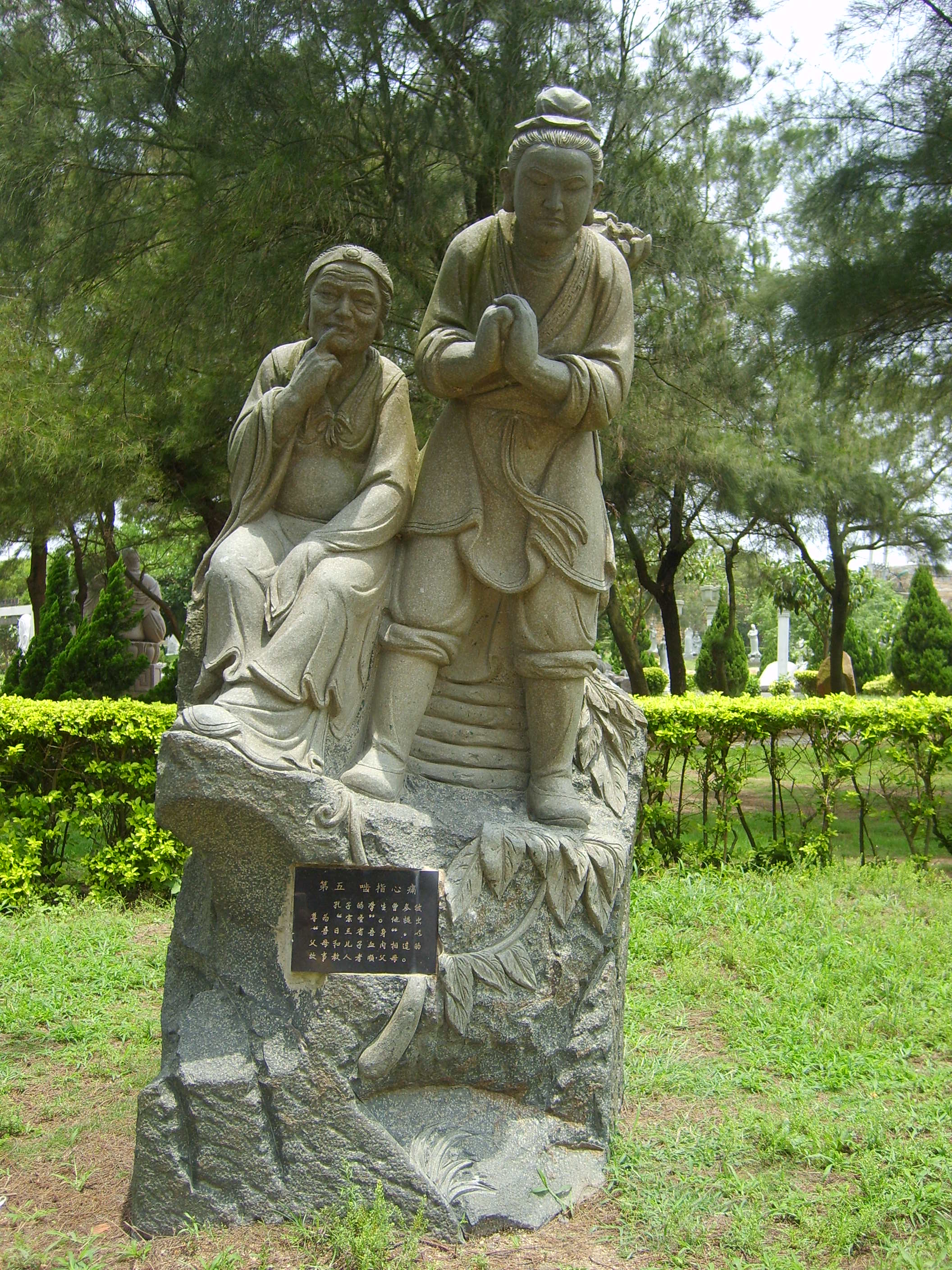
Statue of Zengzi (right) and his mother

Zeng Shen was 46 years younger than Confucius. He was a native of South Wu City in the State of Lu, and was the son of Zeng Dian, one of the earliest disciples of Confucius.

When he was sixteen, he was sent by his father to study under Confucius. Confucians later considered him to be his second most senior student, after Yan Hui. Duanmu Ci said of him, "There is no subject which he has not studied. His appearance is respectful. His virtue is solid. His words command credence. Before great men he draws himself up in the pride of self-respect. His eyebrows are those of longevity." He was noted for his filial piety, and after the death of his parents he could not read the rites of mourning without being led to think of them and being moved to tears. He was a voluminous writer. He composed ten books, compiled in the Rites of the Elder Dai (大戴禮). He was said to have composed and/or edited the Classic of Filial Piety under the direction of Confucius. He was also associated with transmission of the Great Learning. He was first associated with the sacrifices to Confucius in 668 AD, but in 1267 he was advanced to be one of Confucius' Four Assessors. His title, "Exhibitor of the Fundamental Principles of the Sage", dates from the reign of the Jiajing Emperor, when he was associated with Yan Hui.

Zengzi established his own school, and taught Zisi (Kong Ji), the grandson of Confucius, who was in turn the teacher of Mencius, thus beginning a line of transmitters of orthodox Confucian traditions. Along with Yan Hui, Zisi, and Mencius, Zengzi is considered to be one of the Four Sages of Confucianism.

== Filial piety ==
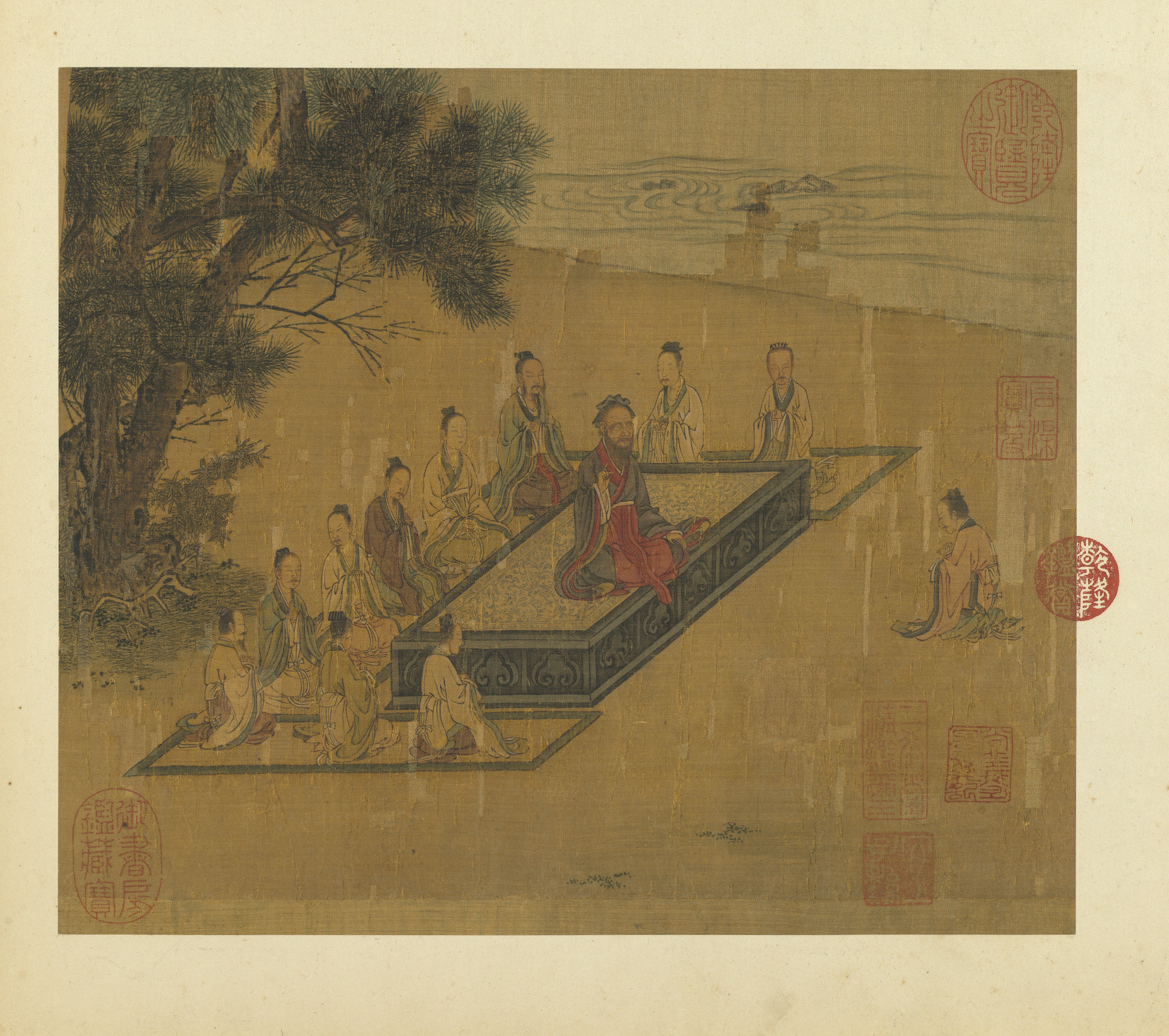
Zengzi (right) kneeling before Confucius (center), as depicted in a painting from the Illustrations of the Classic of Filial Piety, Song dynasty

Zeng Shen was known for his filial piety. After the deaths of his parents, he was unable to read the rites of mourning without bursting into tears.

A famous legend about Zeng Shen, called Nie Zhi Tong Xin (Chinese: 齧指痛心), is included in the influential Yuan dynasty text The Twenty-four Filial Exemplars. In the story, Zeng Shen was one day out gathering firewood, when some visitors unexpectedly showed up at his home. His mother bit her finger, and Zeng felt a sharp pain in his heart. He immediately knew his mother needed him and rushed home.

== Related stories ==
=== Zengzi slaughtered the pig for his son ===
One day, Zengzi's wife went shopping to the market. His son cried when his mother was leaving. She said to her son, “Don't cry. I'll slaughter a pig and make pork dishes for you when I'm back.” When she was back, Zengzi started slaughtering the pig in their yard. Zengzi's wife stopped him and said, “That was intended to be a joke.” Zengzi replied, “We should not lie to our children. Children are innocent and they learn from their parents. Therefore, if you cheat to your son, you're teaching your son to cheat others, and he won't trust you anymore. This is not the correct way to teach your son.” Finally, they cooked the pig for the son.

=== “Zeng Shen” committed murder ===
When Zengzi was living in Fei County, there was a man, with the same name of him, living nearby who committed murder. When the neighbours told Zengzi's mom that “Zeng Shen” committed murder, she initially did not believe it and stayed calm as if nothing happened. But when the third person told her about that, she started to believe that her son committed murder and hurriedly escaped from her house in panic. This story was later widely used as an example to illustrate the serious effect brought by rumours, which is also known as the Woozle effect in English.

== Descendants ==
In 1452 the title Wujing Boshi (五經博士) was bestowed upon the descendants of Zengzi and other Confucian sages such as Mencius, Yan Hui, Zhou Dunyi, and Zhu Xi.

In the Republic of China there is an office called the "Sacrificial Official to Zengzi" which is held by a descendant of Zengzi, like the post of "Sacrificial Official to Mencius" for a descendant of Mencius, "Sacrificial Official to Yan Hui" for a descendant of Yan Hui, and the post of "Sacrificial Official to Confucius", held by a descendant of Confucius.

Some of the descendants of Zengzi include:

- Zeng Gong, 43rd Generation descendant, Northern Song essayist, one of the Eight Great Prose Masters of the Tang and Song
- Zeng Guofan, 70th Generation descendant, Qing dynasty military leader and statesman
- Zeng Guoquan, 70th Generation descendant, Qing dynasty military leader and official, Zeng Guofan's younger brother
- Tsang Hin-chi, 74th Generation descendant, Hong Kong businessman, member of the Standing Committee of the National People's Congress
- Donald Tsang, 74th Generation descendant, 2nd Chief Executive of Hong Kong
- Tsang Yam-pui, 74th Generation descendant, Commissioner of Police of Hong Kong, Donald Tsang's younger brother
- Ethan Zeng, 27th Honors Cohort, The Ohio State University
