= Yan Hui =

Chinese philosopher (c. 521–481 BC)

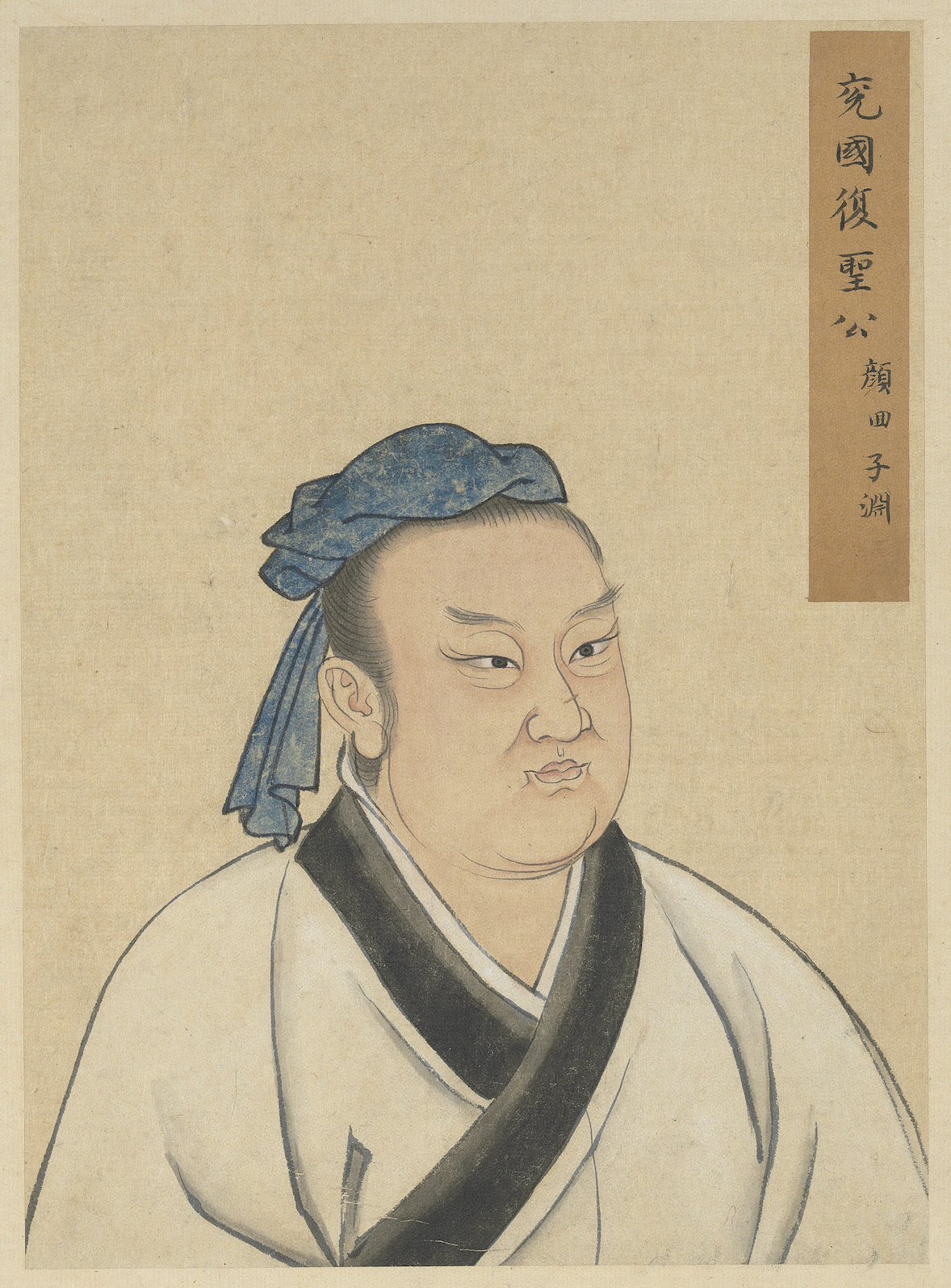
- Yan Hui in Half-Portraits of the Great Sage and Virtuous Men of Old (至聖先賢半身像)
- Traditional Chinese: 顏回
- Simplified Chinese: 颜回
- Hanyu Pinyin: Yán Huí
Transcriptions
Standard Mandarin
- Hanyu Pinyin: Yán Huí
- Bopomofo: ㄧㄢˊ ㄏㄨㄟˊ
- Gwoyeu Romatzyh: Yan Hwei
- Wade–Giles: Yen^{2} Hui^{2}
- Yale Romanization: Yán Hwéi
- IPA: [jɛ̌n xwěɪ]
Old Chinese
- Baxter–Sagart (2014): *C.ŋˤrar [ɢ]ʷˤəj

Alternative names
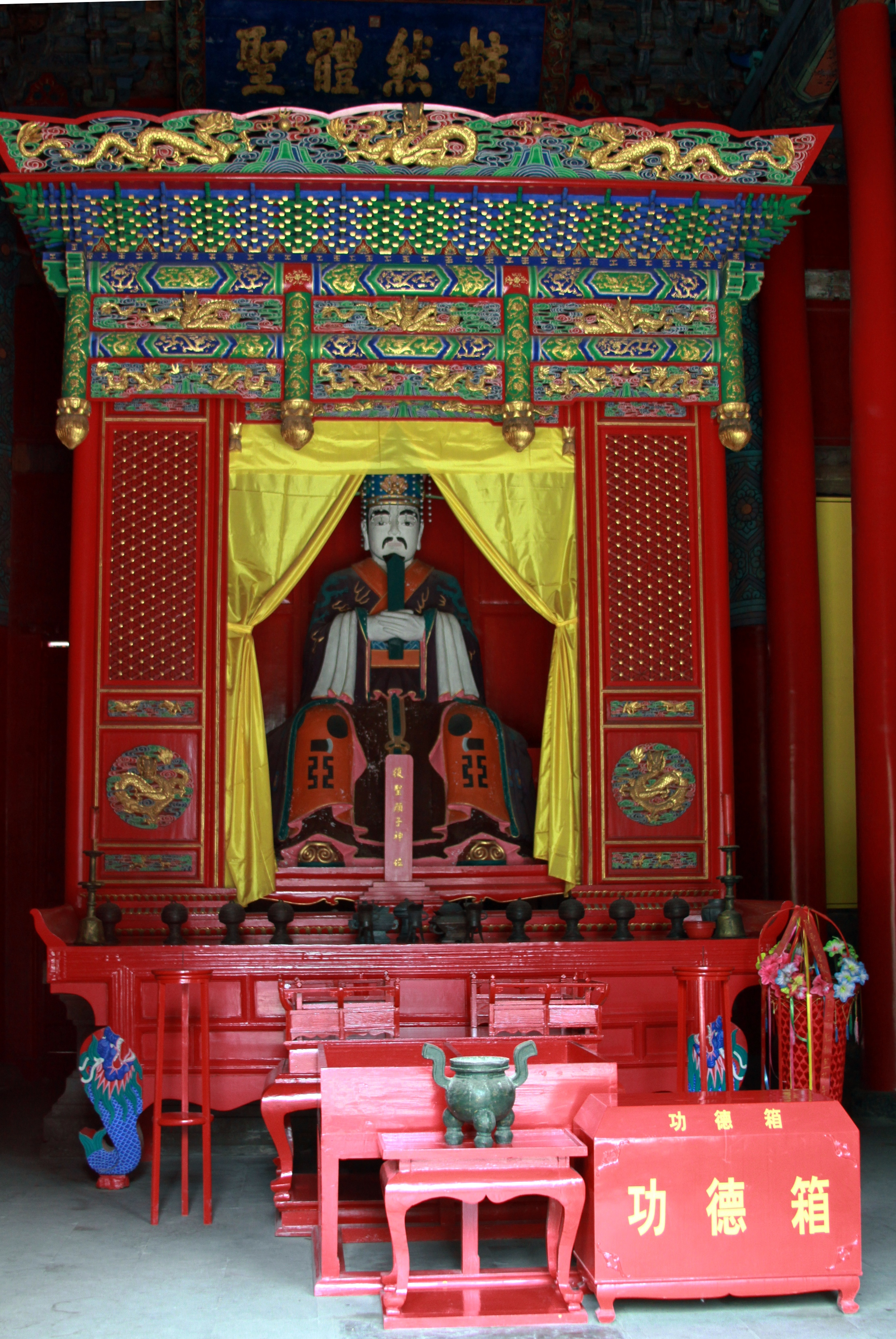
- Yan Hui in his temple at Qufu in Shandong

Courtesy name Ziyuan
- Traditional Chinese: 子淵
- Simplified Chinese: 子渊
- Hanyu Pinyin: Zǐyuān
Transcriptions
Standard Mandarin
- Hanyu Pinyin: Zǐyuān
- Bopomofo: ㄗˇ ㄩㄢ
- Gwoyeu Romatzyh: Tzyy'iuan
- Wade–Giles: Tzŭ^{3}-yüan^{1}
- Yale Romanization: Džywān
- IPA: [tsɹ̩̀.ɥɛ́n]

Yan Yuan
- Traditional Chinese: 顏淵
- Simplified Chinese: 颜渊
- Hanyu Pinyin: Yán Yuān
Transcriptions
Standard Mandarin
- Hanyu Pinyin: Yán Yuān
- Bopomofo: ㄧㄢˊ ㄩㄢ
- Gwoyeu Romatzyh: Yan Iuan
- Wade–Giles: Yen^{2} Yüan^{1}
- Yale Romanization: Yán Ywān
- IPA: [jɛ̌n ɥɛ́n]

Master Yan
- Traditional Chinese: 顏子
- Simplified Chinese: 颜子
- Hanyu Pinyin: Yánzǐ
Transcriptions
Standard Mandarin
- Hanyu Pinyin: Yánzǐ
- Bopomofo: ㄧㄢˊ ㄗˇ
- Gwoyeu Romatzyh: Yantzyy
- Wade–Giles: Yen^{2} Tzŭ^{3}
- Yale Romanization: Yándž
- IPA: [jɛ̌n.tsɹ̩̀]

Posthumous name Fusheng
- Traditional Chinese: 複聖 復聖
- Simplified Chinese: 复圣
- Hanyu Pinyin: Fùshèng
- Literal meaning: Second Coming of the Sage
Transcriptions
Standard Mandarin
- Hanyu Pinyin: Fùshèng
- Bopomofo: ㄈㄨˋ ㄕㄥˋ
- Gwoyeu Romatzyh: Fuhshenq
- Wade–Giles: Fu^{4}-shêng^{4}
- Yale Romanization: Fùshèng
- IPA: [fû.ʂə̂ŋ]

Yan Hui (c. 521–481 BC) was a Chinese philosopher. He was the favorite disciple of Confucius and one of the most revered figures of Confucianism. He is venerated in Confucian temples as one of the Four Sages.

== Names ==
Yan Hui is also known by his courtesy name Ziyuan and as Yan Yuan, a combination of his surname and courtesy name. He is also reverently referred to as Master Yan or Yanzi.

== Life ==
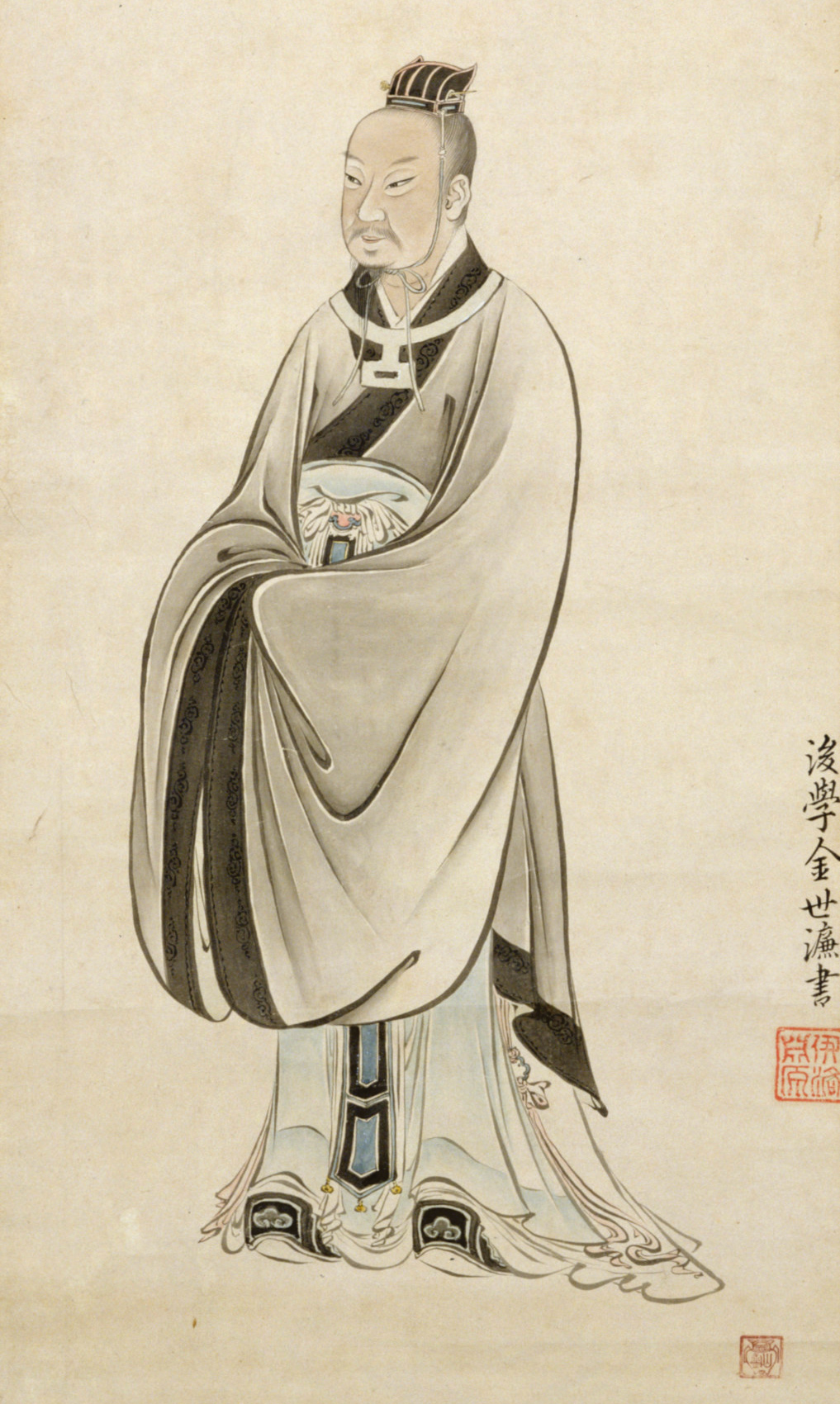
Painting of Yanzi by Kanō Sansetsu. Japan, Edo period, 1632.

Yan Hui was a native of the state of Lu. His father Yan Wuyou (Yan Lu) was one of the earliest disciples of Confucius. Yan Hui was about 30 years younger than Confucius, and became a student of the Master at a young age.

Yan Hui was Confucius' favorite disciple. "After I got Yan Hui," Confucius remarked, "the disciples came closer to me." We are told that once, when he found himself on the Nang hill with Yan Hui, Zilu, and Zigong, Confucius asked them to tell him their different aims, and he would choose between them. Zilu began, and when he had done, the master said, "It marks your bravery." Zigong followed, on whose words the judgment was, "They show your discriminating eloquence." At last came Yan Hui, who said, "I should like to find an intelligent king and sage ruler whom I might assist. I would diffuse among the people instructions on the five great points, and lead them on by the rules of propriety and music, so that they should not care to fortify their cities by walls and moats, but would fuse their swords and spears into implements of agriculture. They should send forth their flocks without fear into the plains and forests. There should be no sunderings of families, no widows or widowers. For a thousand years there would be no calamity of war. Yu would have no opportunity to display his bravery, or Ts'ze to display his oratory." The master pronounced, "How admirable is this virtue!"

== Death ==
When Yan Hui was twenty-nine, his hair was all white. He died some time after.

After the death of Yan Hui, Confucius lamented, "Heaven has bereft me!" twice. When told by other students that he was showing "excessive grief", the old philosopher replied: "Am I showing excessive grief? Well, for whom would I show excessive grief if not for this man?". Even years later, Confucius would say that no other student could take Yan Hui's place, so gifted and dedicated Yan Hui had been.

== Veneration ==
Yan Hui, along with Confucius himself, was venerated by the first emperor of the Han dynasty. The title which he now has in the sacrificial Canon—Fusheng ("Continuator of the Sage")—was conferred in the ninth year of the Jiajing era, A.D. 1530. Almost all the present sacrificial titles of the worthies in the Temple of Confucius were fixed at that time. Yan Hui's place is the first of the Four Assessors, on the east of Confucius.

== Descendants ==
The Yan family were from Langye (琅邪). The Yans abandoned northern China in 317. The devastation of the north during the Western Jin's (266–420) collapse caused the southward journey of Yan Han, who was mentioned in the Guan wo sheng fu by Yan Zhitui. After that, they served the Southern dynasties.

In 495 CE, Emperor Xiaowen of the Northern Wei, who venerated Confucius and his teachings, bestowed official ranks upon two scions of Yan Hui's lineage.

The clan had resided in the south for eight generations when Yan Zhitui (531–591) was born. His grandfather, Yan Jianyuan had committed suicide by hunger strike after the 502 rebellion against the Southern Qi. Yan Zhitui's father was Yan Xie. His elder brothers were Yan Zhiyi and Yan Zhisan. Yan Zhitui himself served under several dynasties during his lifetime and composed the Family Instructions to the Yan Clan (Yanshi Jiaxun 顏氏家訓). He also compiled the Yuanhun Zhi 冤魂志. In the approximately 1,000 years from Yan Hui's to Yan Zhitui's generation, two Yans sought a military career; most of the Yans served as literati.

For most of the Ming (1368–1644) and during the entire Qing (1644–1912) dynasty, Yan Hui's descendants held the hereditary title of Wujing Boshi (五经博士; 五經博士; Wǔjīng Bóshì), a scholarly rank from the Hanlin Academy. The current only direct descendant (the seventy-ninth generation) of Yan Hui is Yan Binggang (顏秉刚).

In Taiwan there is an office called the "Sacrificial Official" (Fengsiguan 奉祀官) to the Four Sages of Confucianism, which include Yan Hui.

== Shrines ==
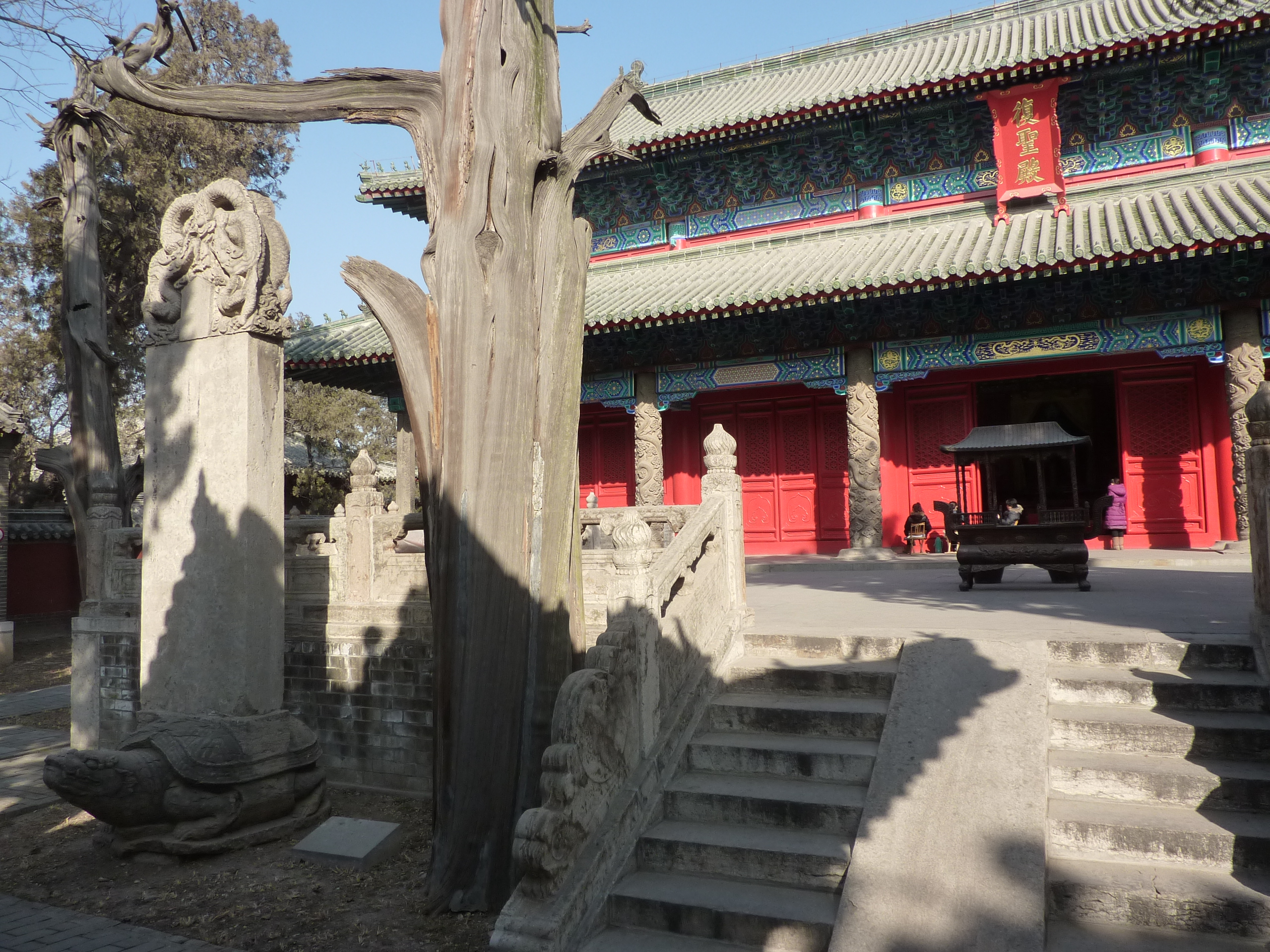
Fusheng Hall, the main sanctuary of the Temple of Yan Hui in Qufu, Shandong province

Yan Hui is venerated at the Temple of Yan Hui, which is located in Qufu's walled city, a few blocks north of the Temple of Confucius.

Yan Hui's tomb is now surrounded by hundreds of tombs of his descendants, forming the Yan Family Cemetery ("Yan Forest"). A stele was installed at his tomb during the Jurchen Jin dynasty, and re-erected during the Ming dynasty. The tomb is well preserved.

== See also ==
- Four Sages
- Neo-Confucianism
- Progeria
