= Four Sages =

Four eminent Chinese philosophers in the Confucian tradition

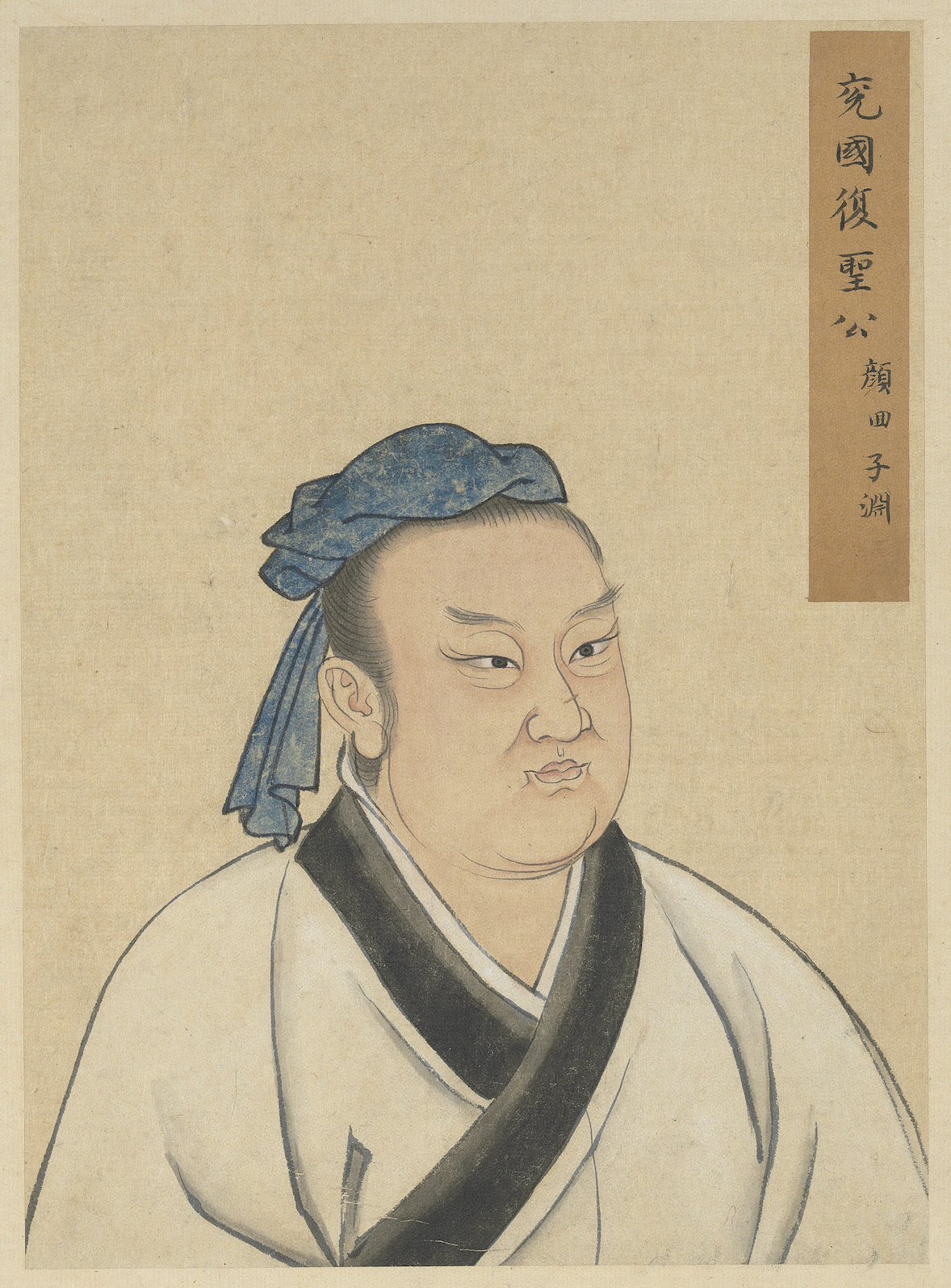
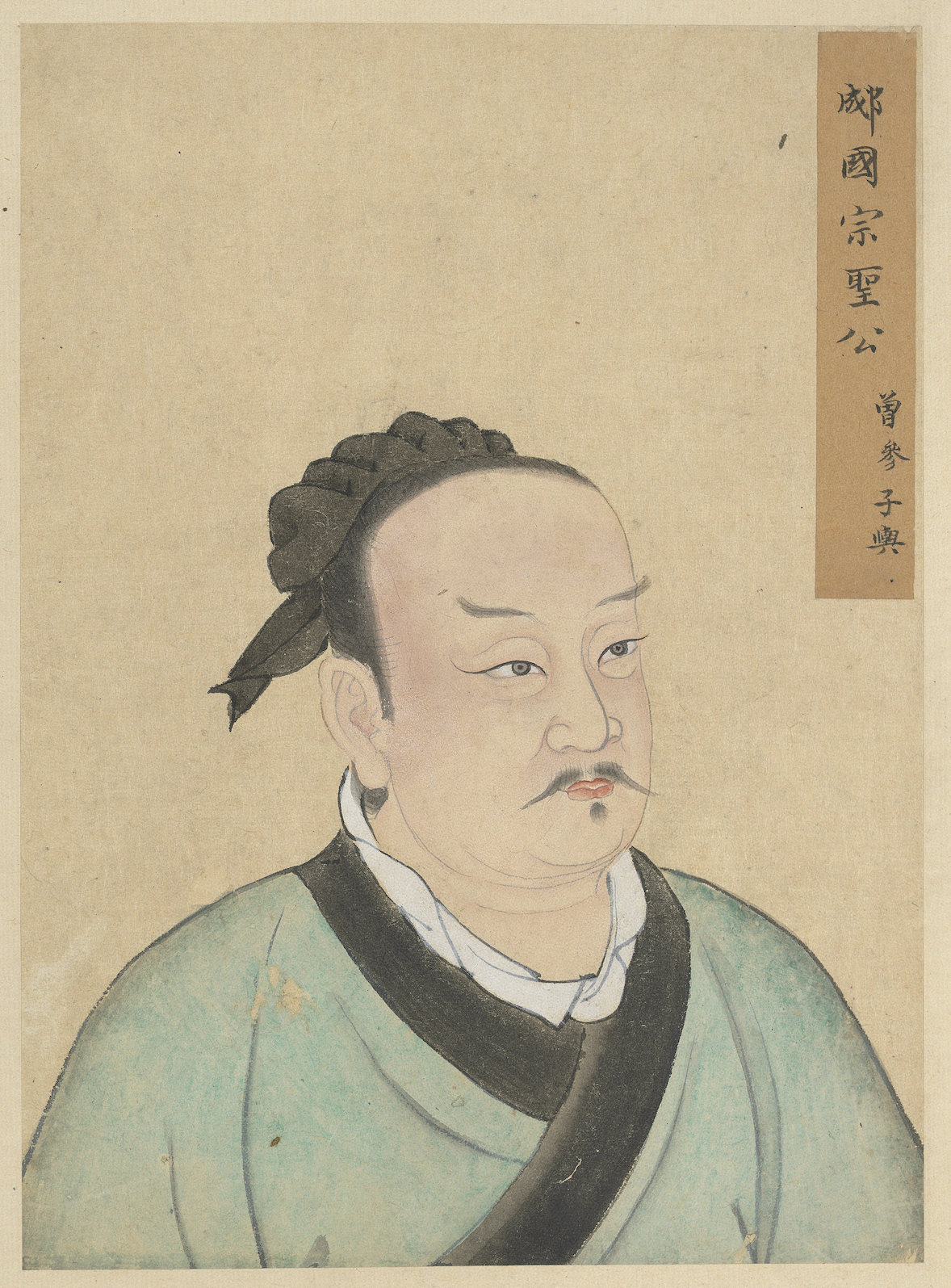
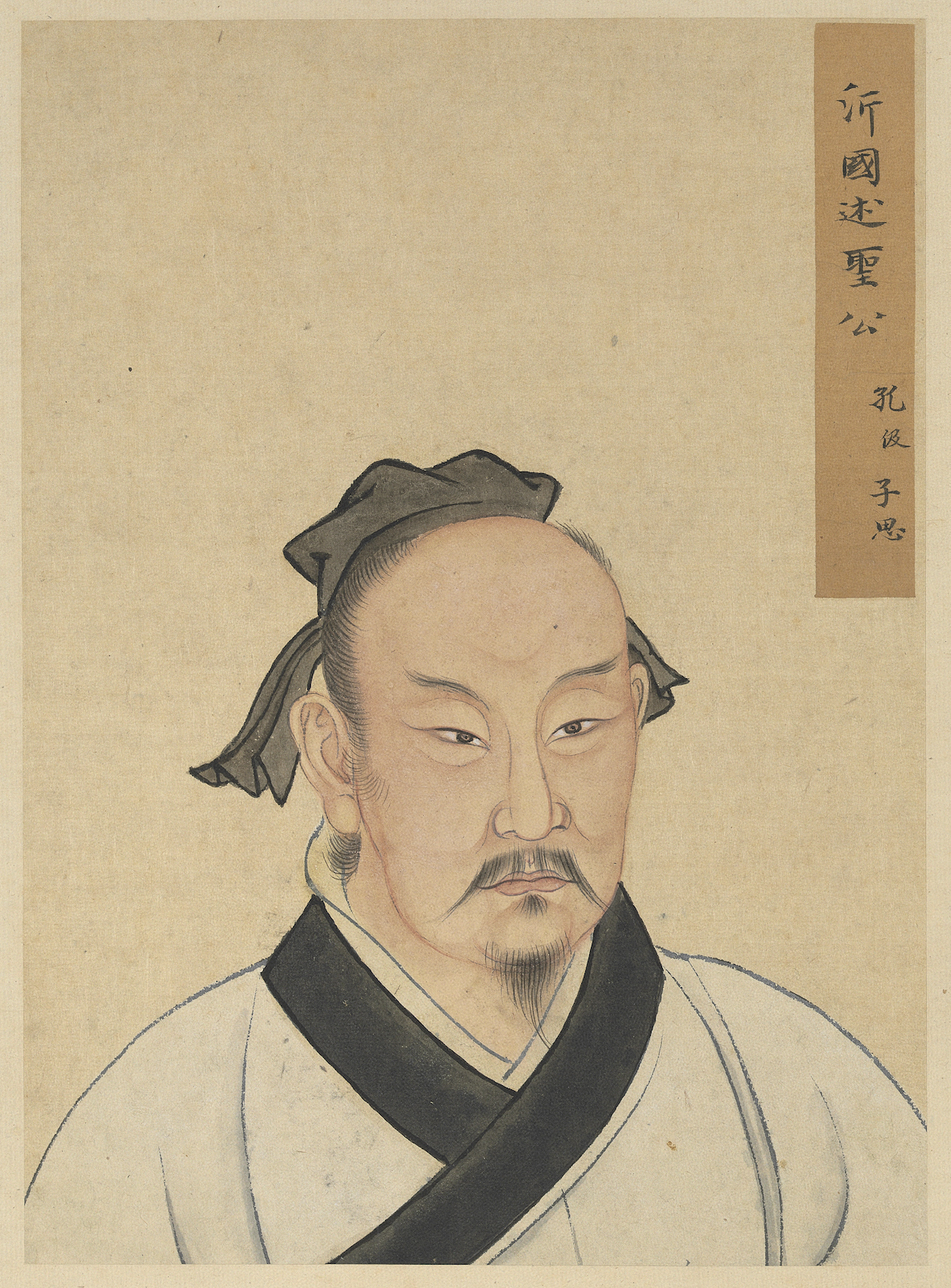
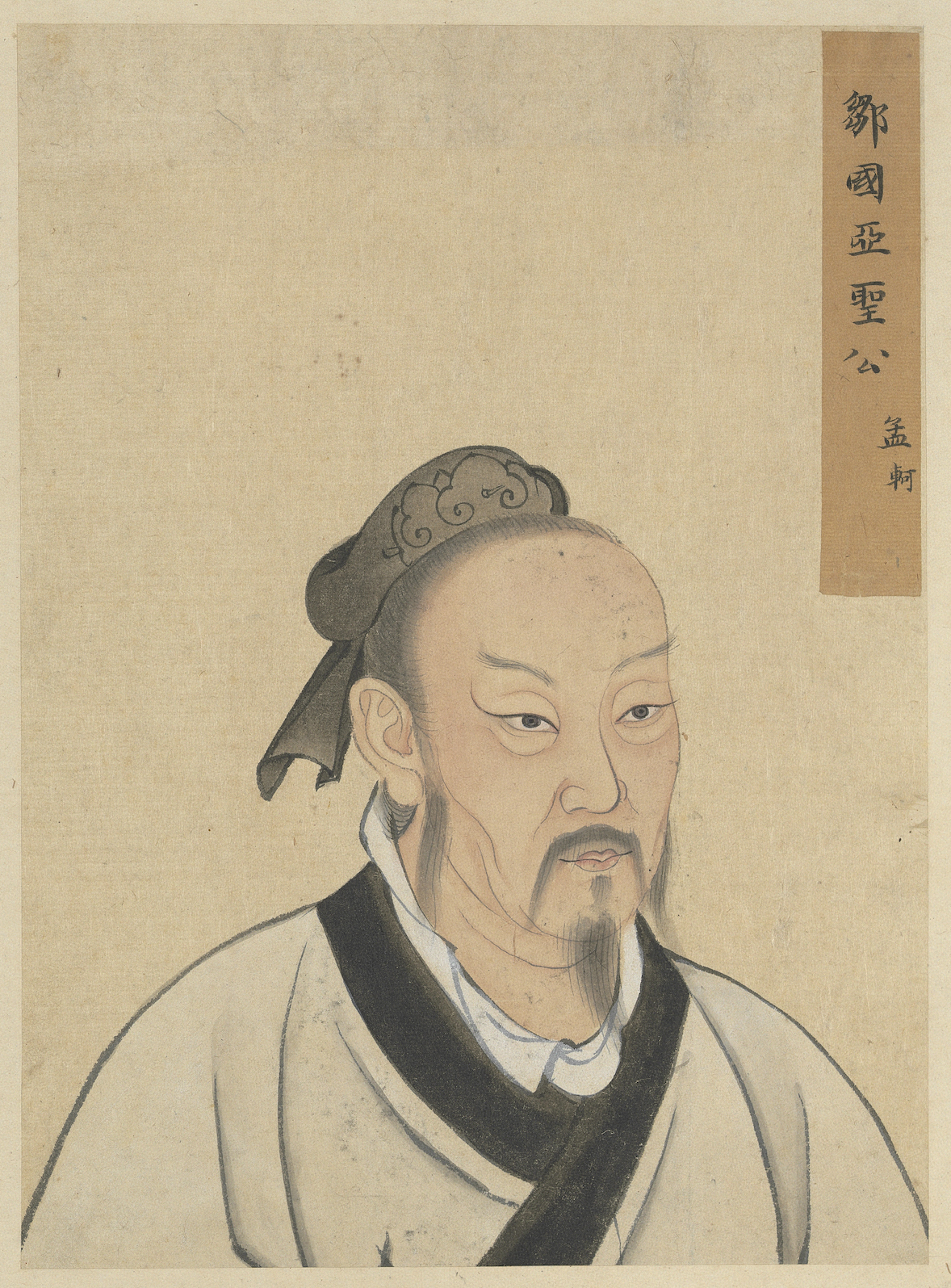
The Four Sages of Confucianism, depicted in Half Portraits of the Great Sage and Virtuous Men of Old (至聖先賢半身像) – housed in the National Palace Museum in Taipei.

Clockwise from top-left:

- Yan Hui
- Zengzi
- Mencius
- Zisi

The Four Sages, Assessors, or Correlates (Chinese: 四配; pinyin: Sì Pèi), are four eminent figures in the Chinese philosopher and Confucianism tradition. They are traditionally accorded a status akin to sainthood, and their spirit tablets are prominently placed in Confucian temples.

The Four Sages are:

- Yan Hui (521–481 BC), Confucius's favourite disciple, prominently featured in the Analects.
- Zengzi or Zeng Shen (505–435 BC), another disciple of Confucius and author of the Great Learning.
- Zisi or Kong Ji (481–402 BCE), Confucius's grandson and student of Zengzi, and author of the Doctrine of the Mean.
- Mencius or Master Meng (372–289 BC), a student of Zisi and author of the Mencius.

Within a traditional Confucian temple, Yan Hui's tablet is placed first to the east of Confucius.

The families of the descendants of the Four Sages 四氏 continue to hold hereditary offices in the Republic of China (Taiwan), such as the Sacrificial Official to Confucius, "Sacrificial Official to Mencius", "Sacrificial Official to Zengzi", and "Sacrificial Official to Yan Hui". These families (except for the Yan's) use generation poems, which were bestowed upon them by Ming and Qing Emperors.

希言公彥承，宏聞貞尚衍；
興毓傳繼廣，昭憲慶繁祥；
令德維垂佑，欽紹念顯揚；
建道敦安定，懋修肇彝常；
裕文煥景瑞，永錫世緒昌。

== See also ==
- Confucianism
- Disciples of Confucius
- Twelve Philosophers
- Kong Family Mansion
- Temple of Confucius, Qufu
- Cemetery of Confucius
- Temple of Zengzi 曾廟
- Mencius's sites: Meng family mansion 孟府, Temple of Mencius 孟廟, and Cemetery of Mencius 孟林.
- Temple of Yan Hui
