= Family instructions =

Traditional Chinese literary genre

Family instructions or family rules (Chinese: 家训; pinyin: jiāxùn) are a genre of traditional Chinese didactic literature that prescribes moral teachings and codes of conduct for the family unit. Typically written by a patriarch or esteemed elder, these texts were intended to guide descendants in proper Confucian behavior, household governance, and personal conducts. They reflect the Confucian belief that good government and social harmony begin with self-cultivation and well-ordered families – cultivate oneself, regulate the family, govern the state, and bring peace to all under heaven (修身,齐家,治国,平天下, “xiushen, qijia, zhiguo, ping tianxia”). As such, family instructions became a vital means of transmitting Confucian values—filial piety, fraternal love, loyalty, integrity, and ritual propriety—across generations within a family. This tradition evolved over centuries, reaching from early imperial times through the Tang, Song, Ming, and Qing dynasties, and played a significant role in shaping both elite culture and popular ethics in China.

== Prominent works ==
- "Admonitions to my son Bo Qin" (诫伯禽书), by Duke of Zhou
- "A Letter Admonishing My Son" (诫子书), and "A Letter Admonishing My Nephew"(诫外甥书), by Zhuge Liang
- Family Instructions of the Yan Clan (颜氏家训), by Yan Zhitui
- "Bao Zheng’s Family Instructions"(包拯家训)
- Maxims for Managing the Home (朱子家训 or 治家格言) by Zhu Bolu(朱柏庐)
- Standards for Students: Instructions in Virtue from the Chinese Heritage (弟子规) by Li Yuxiu (李毓秀)
- Liao-Fan’s Four Lessons (了凡四训) by Yuan Huang (袁黄)
- Family instructions (聪训斋语) by Zhang Ying (张英), father of Zhang Tingyu
- Family instructions (澄怀园语) by Zhang Tingyu
- Family Letters (曾国藩家书) of Zeng Guofan
