= Yan Youqin =

Yan Youqin (顏游秦), courtesy name Youdao (有道), native of Linyi, Langya Commandery, was a politician who lived during the Sui dynasty and the Tang dynasty. He was the governor of Lianzhou.

== Background ==
Yan Youqin was the third son of Yan Zhitui. He was a compiler and proofreading official of Secret Pavilion. In 623, he moved to Lianzhou and Yunzhou, given the title Baron of Linyi. He was the author of the twelve volumes of "Han Shu Jue Yi", which was quoted by Yan Shigu in his "Han Shu Zhu".

== Life ==
The common people sang Yan Youqin's touching deeds in the form of poems, praising him for his diligence and righteousness, and his love for the people.
