= Temple of Yan Hui =

Chinese temple

Coordinates: 35°36′3″N 116°59′19″E

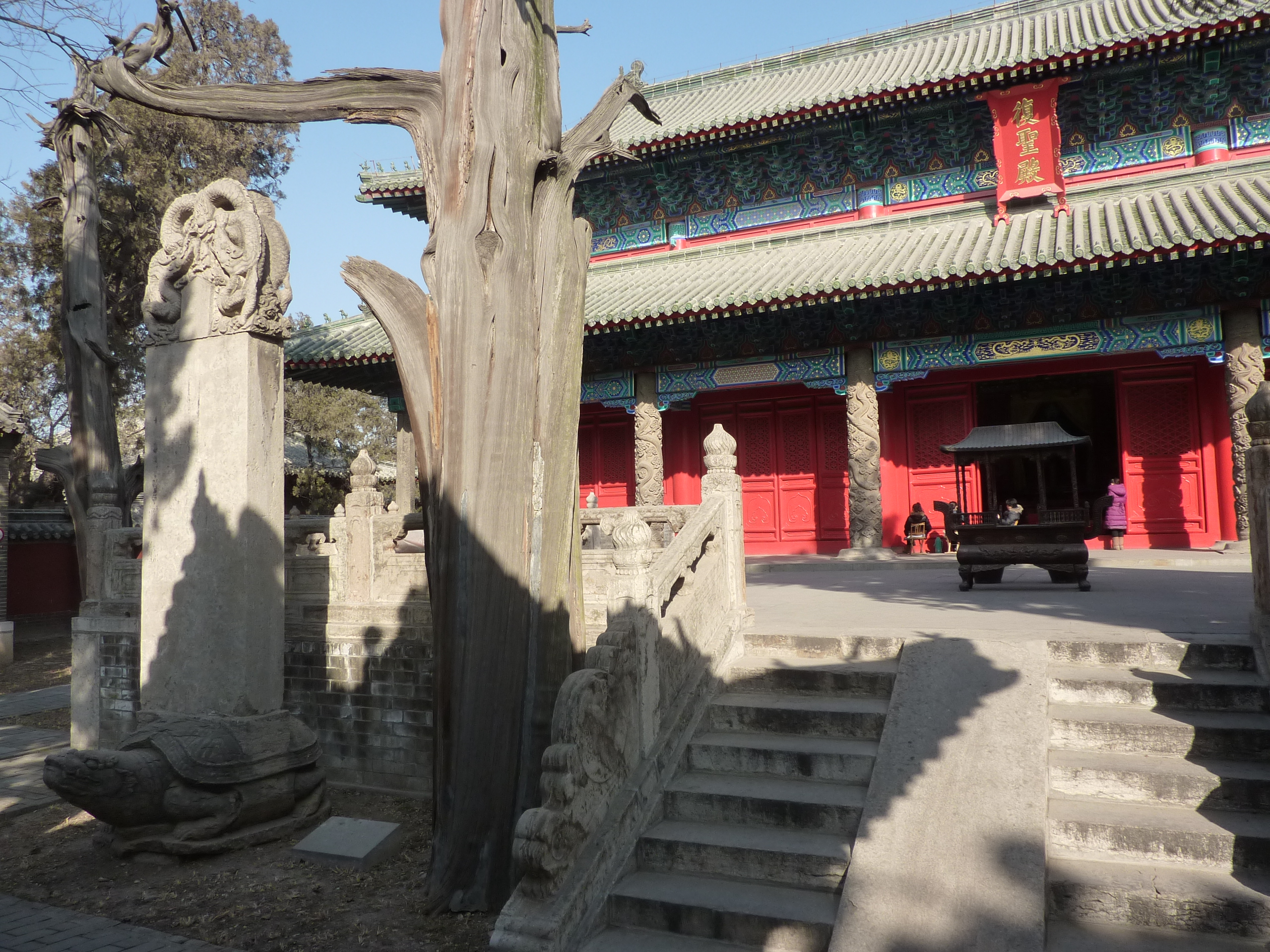
Fusheng Hall ("The Hall of the Continuator of the Sage"), the main sanctuary of the temple.

The Temple of Yan Hui, commonly known as simply the Temple of Yan or Yan Temple (Chinese: 颜庙; pinyin: Yán miào), is a temple in Qufu, Jining, Shandong, China, dedicated to Yan Hui (521-490 BC), the favorite disciple of Confucius.

== Location and layout ==
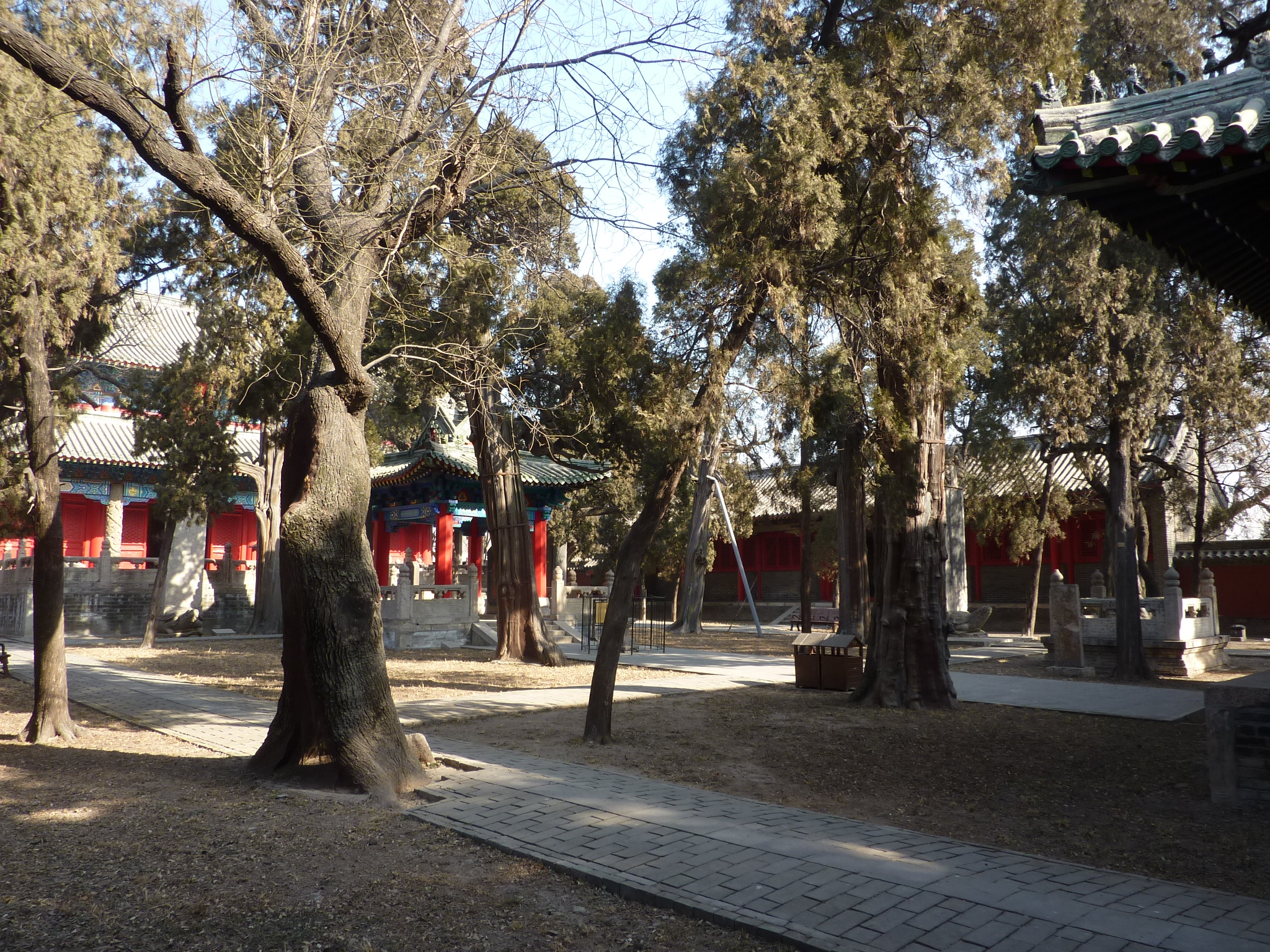
The northern courtyard of the temple

The temple is located within the historic walled city of Qufu, the hometown of both Confucius and Yan Hui, in modern Shandong Province. The temple is just south of the northern gates of the city wall, and is few blocks to the north of the Temple of Confucius (which is located north of the city wall's southern gates).

The temple's premises are a rectangle, 254.50 m long (from the north to the south) and 109.80 m wide (from the east to the west). According to local historians, there are 148 architectural and sculptural objects (halls, pavilions, gates, steles) on the temple's premises, as well as 369 valuable old trees.

== Gallery ==
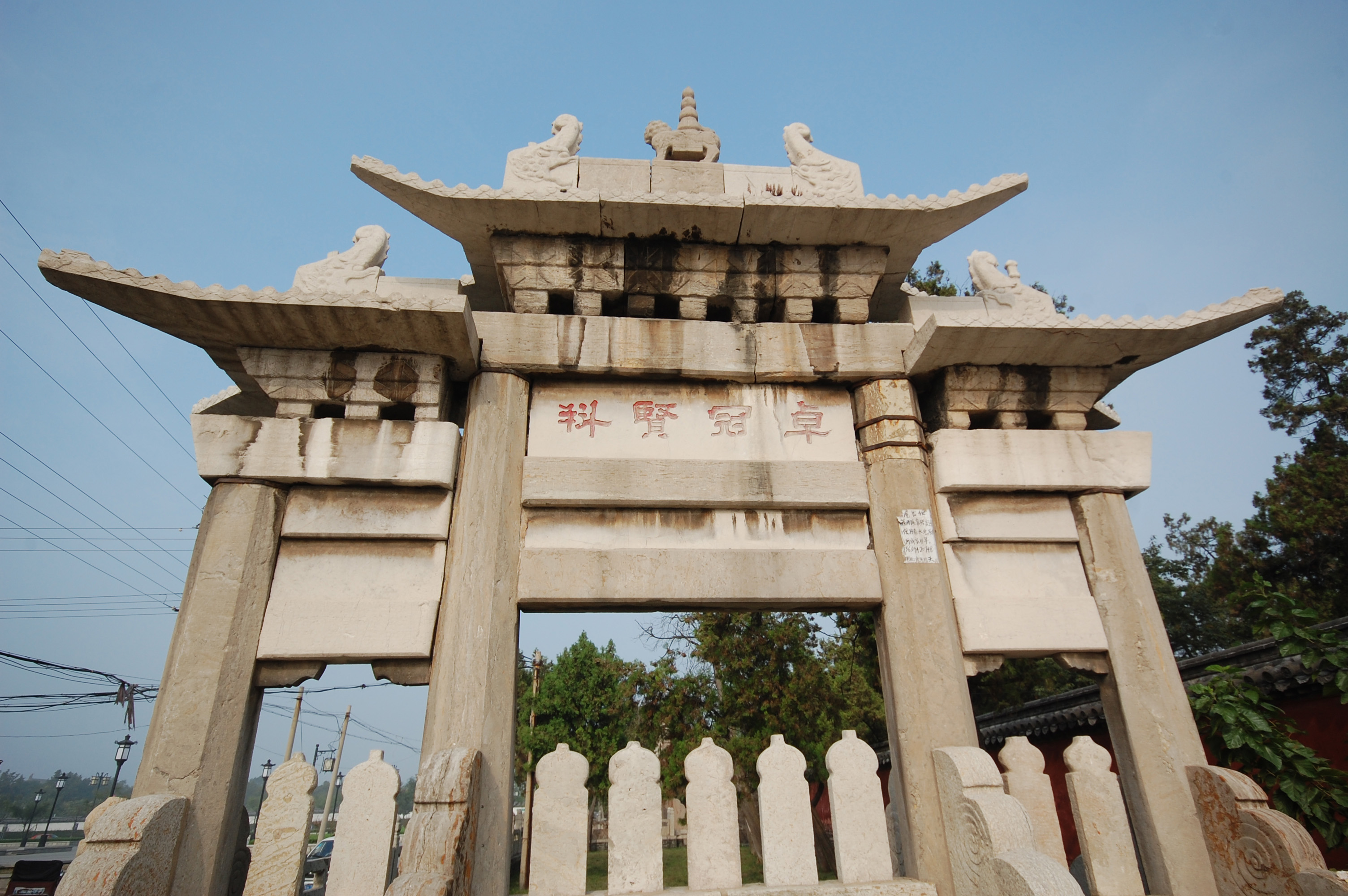
A gateway

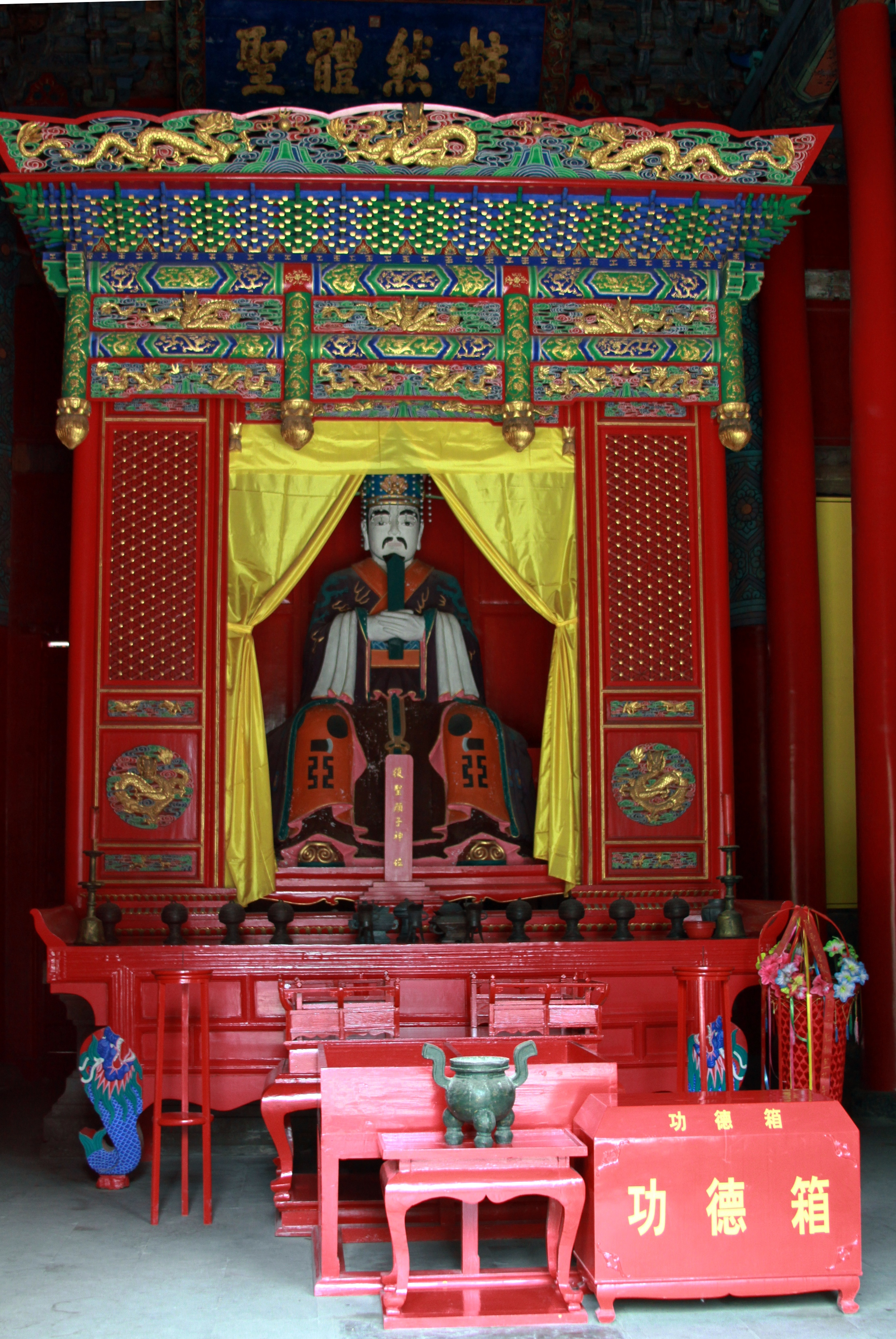
The sanctuary (Hall of Fusheng)

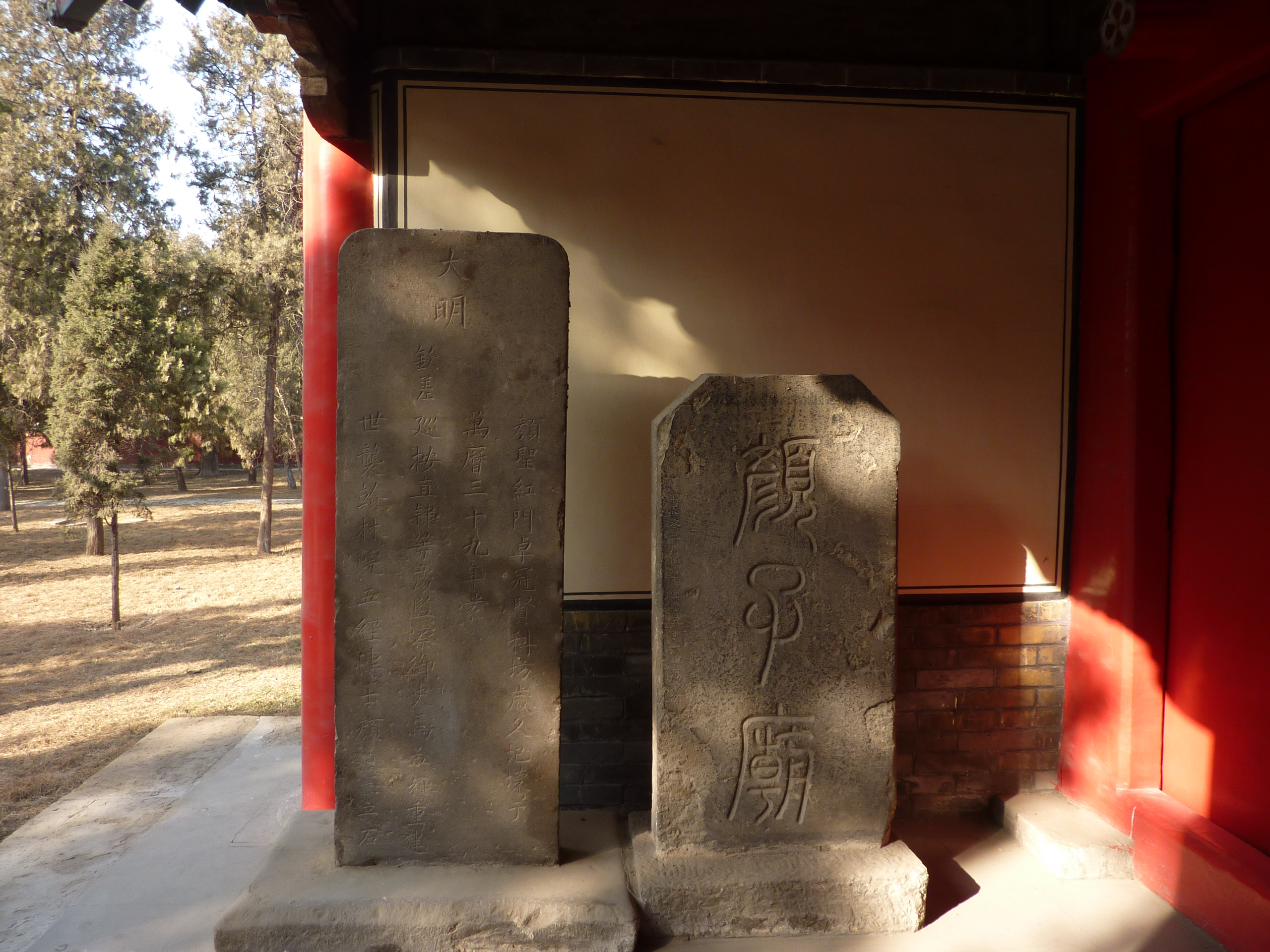
"Yan Zi Miao" Stele (right), Year 24 of the Dading era (1184), and a Wanli 39 (1611) stele (left)

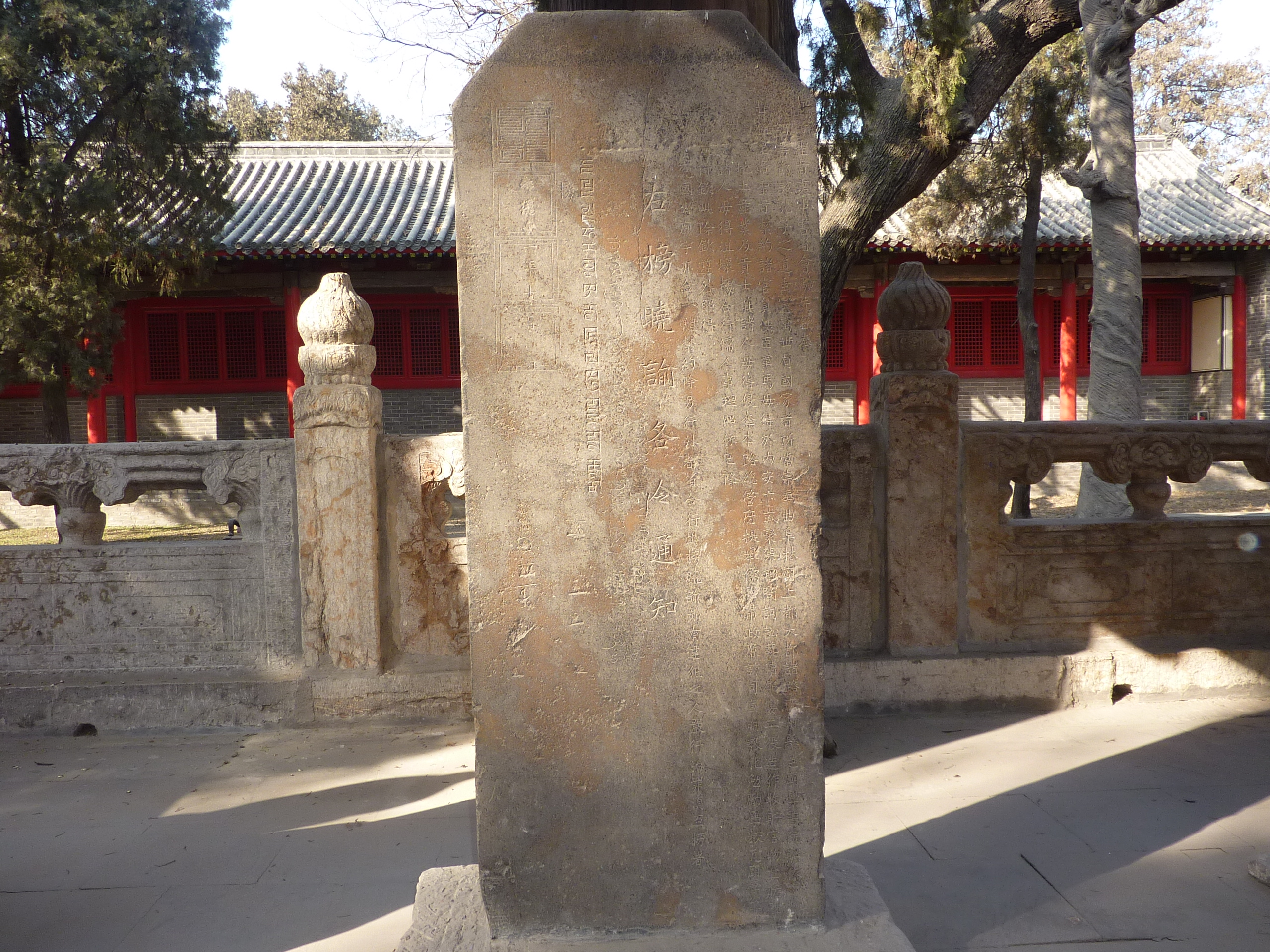
Edict of Temür Khan granting protection to the temple, in Chinese and Mongol ('Phags-pa script). Dade 11 (1307)

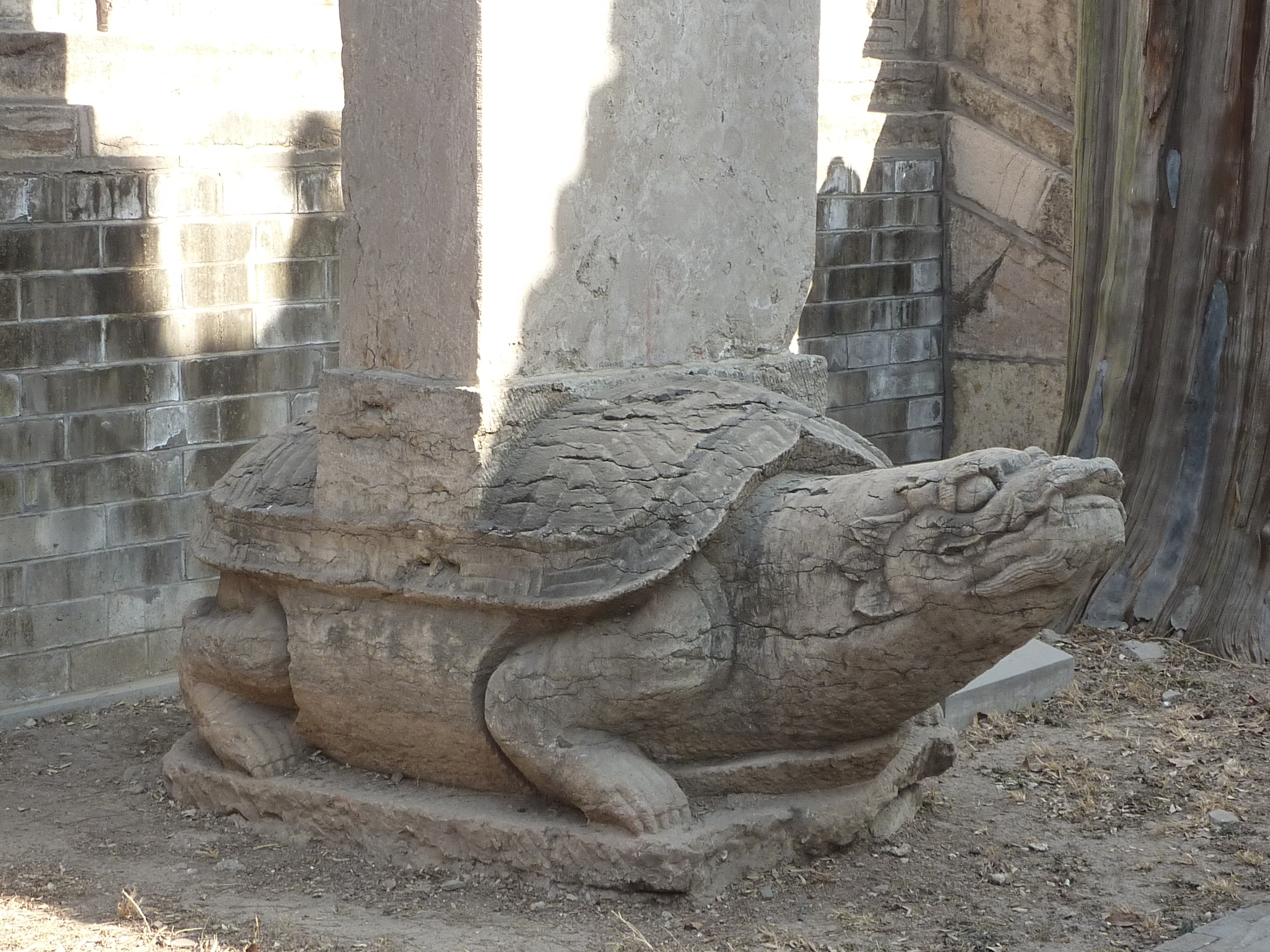
Bilingual stele granting Yan Hui the title of Fusheng (Continuator of the Sage), Duke of Yanguo. Zhishun 2 (1331)

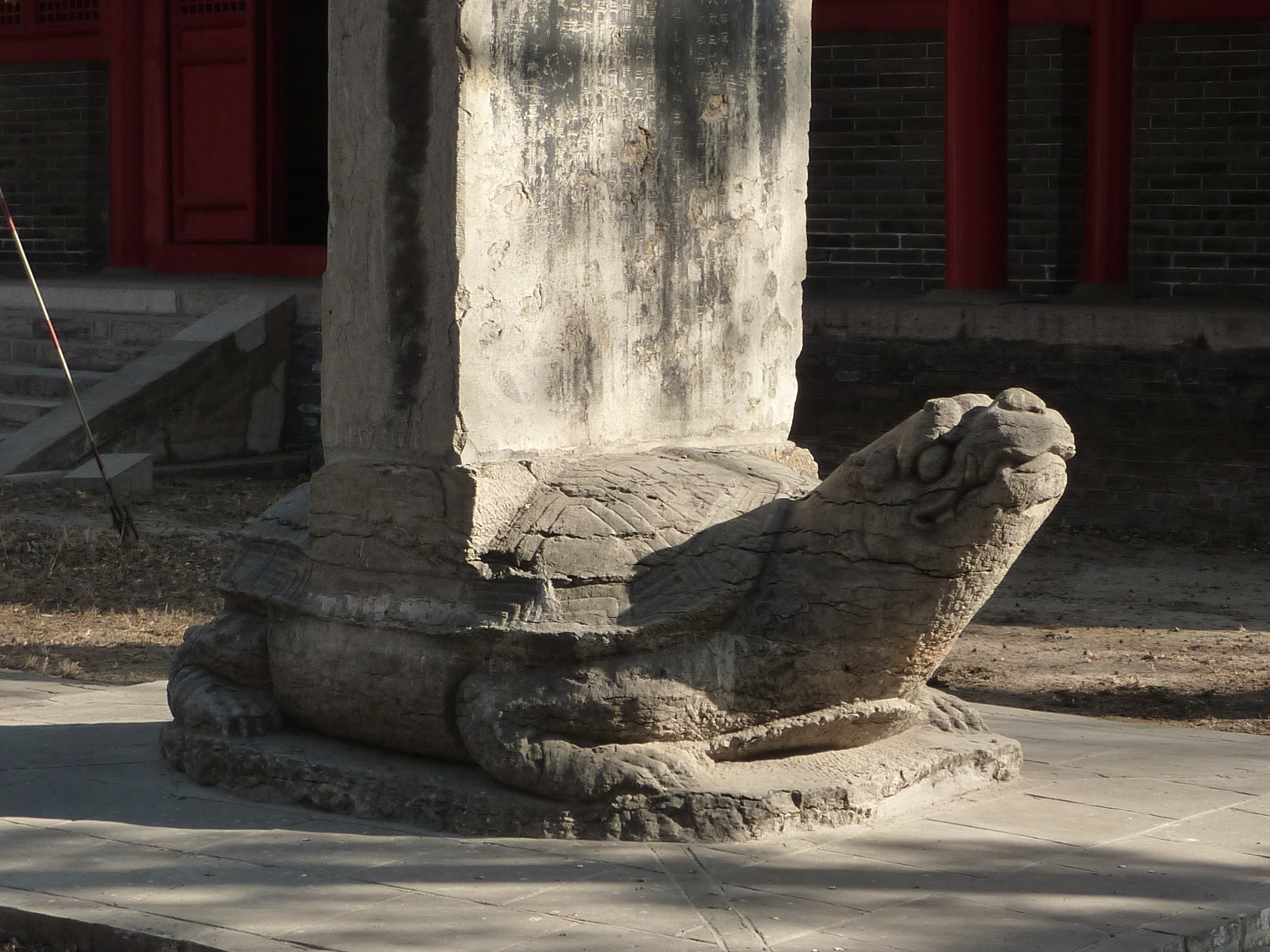
Stele in memory of rebuilding the temple. Zhizheng 9 (1349)

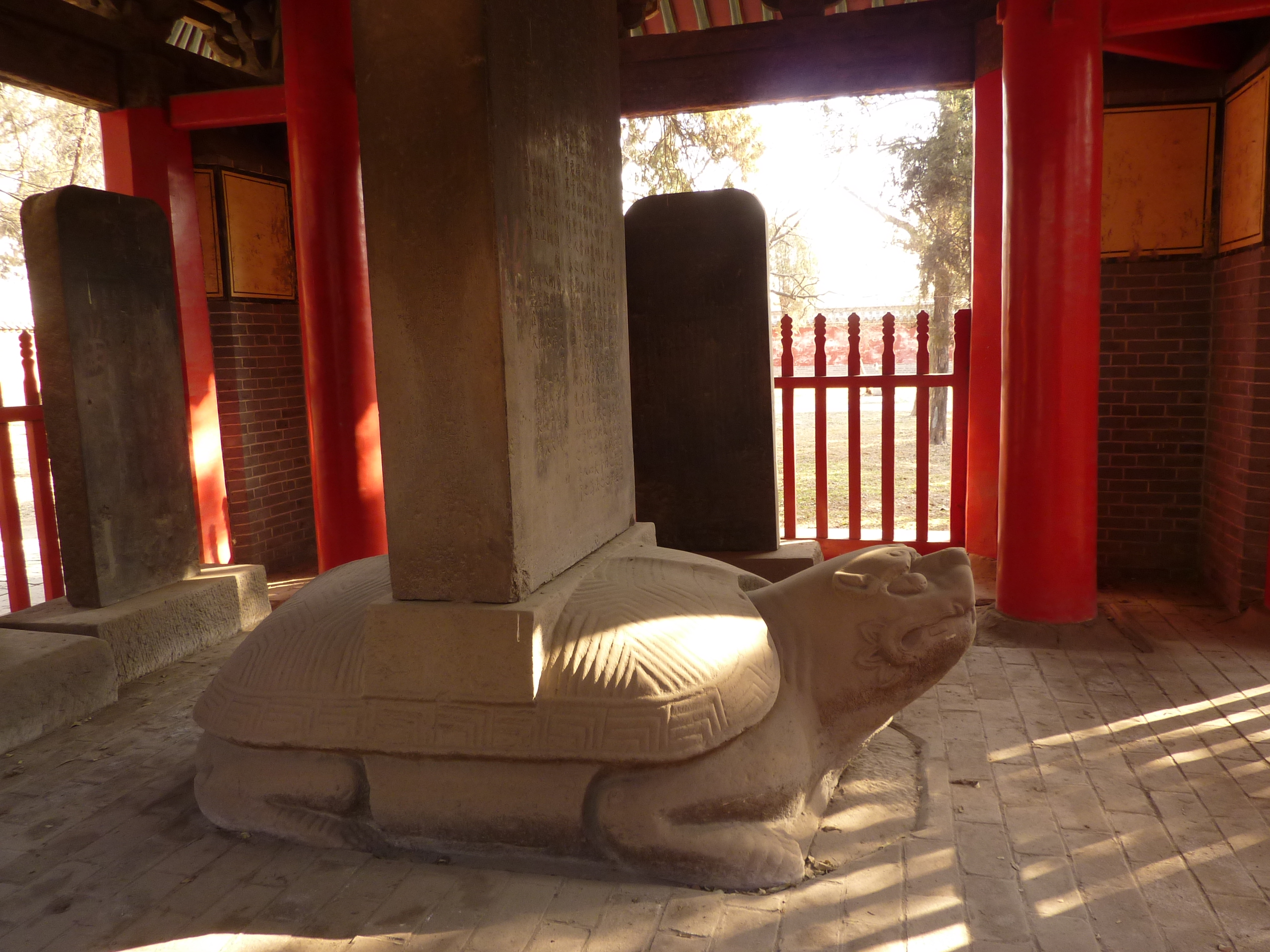
Stele in memory of rebuilding the temple. Zhengtong 6 (1441)

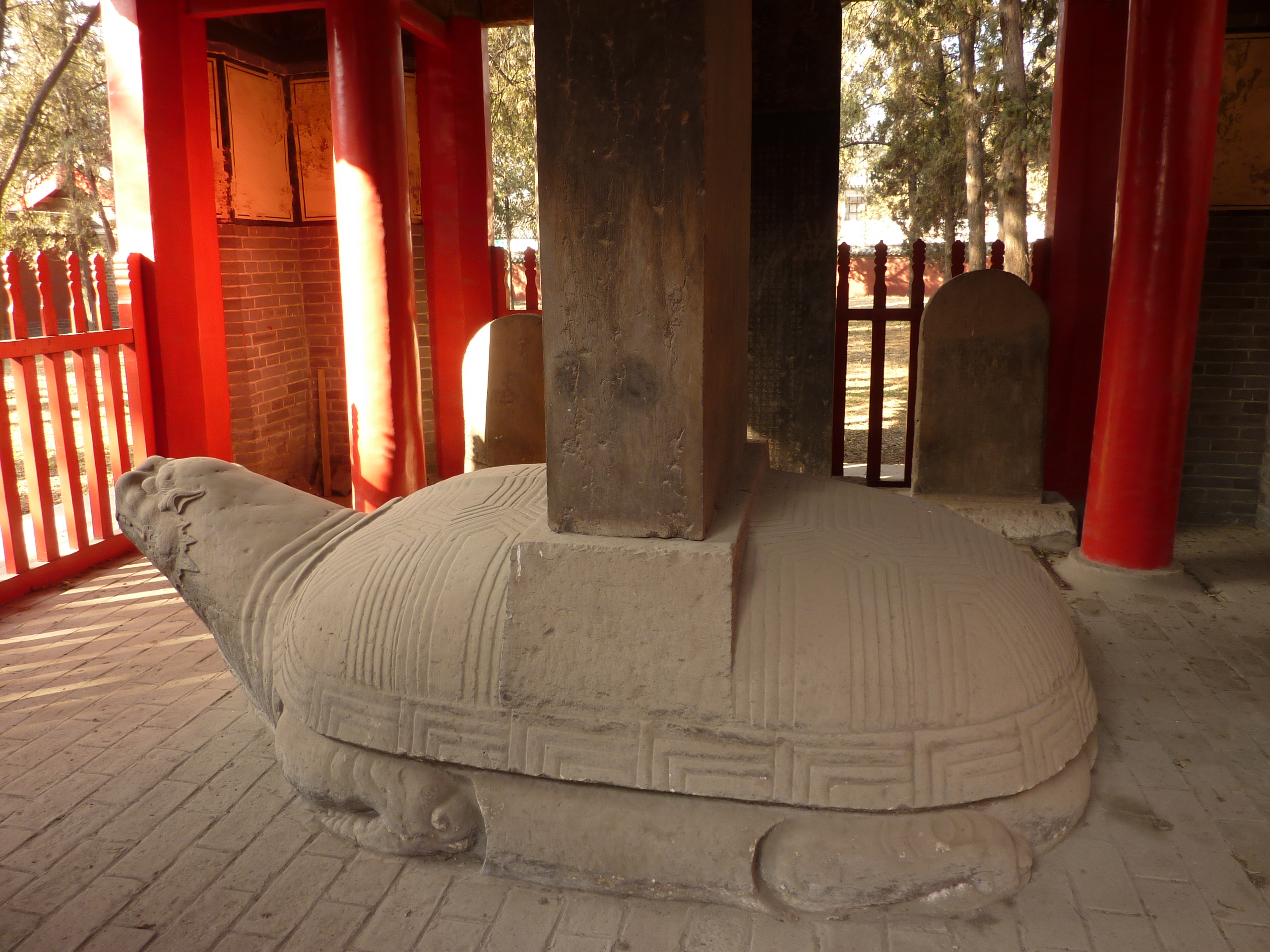
Stele in memory of rebuilding the temple. Zhengde 4 (1509)

== See also ==
- Temple of Confucius, Qufu
- Temple of Mencius 孟廟
- Temple of Zengzi 曾廟
