= Yan Zhiyi =

Northern Zhou Dynasty minister and Sui Dynasty governor (523–591)

Yan Zhiyi (颜之仪) (523–591), courtesy name Zisheng (子升), was a native of Linyi County, Langya Commandery (琅琊郡) (now Shandong Province). He was a minister during the Northern Zhou dynasty and a governor during the Sui dynasty. He died in the winter of 591-592 at the age of 69 (by East Asian reckoning).

== Life ==
=== During the Southern Liang dynasty ===
Yan Zhiyi's father Yan Xie entered the service of Emperor Yuan of Liang, when the latter was still Prince of Xiangdong. In January 555, Western Wei (the precursor state of Northern Zhou) captured Jiangling, and Yan Zhiyi (presumably with his family) moved to Chang'an.

=== During the Northern Zhou dynasty ===
At Chang'an, Yan Zhitui first entered the service of Emperor Ming.

On 27 March 576, when Yuwen Yun (the later Emperor Xuan) was still crown prince during the reign of his father Emperor Wu, he was sent on an expedition against the Tuyuhun. Yuwen Yun made errors during this expedition; while officials like Zheng Yi (郑译) were reprimanded for failing to correct the crown prince, Yan Zhiyi was rewarded for his repeated petitions. Yan was made Baron of Pingyang County, with a fiefdom of 200 households.

During the reign of Emperor Xuan, Yan Zhiyi was made a duke and his fiefdom increased to a thousand households.

After the death of Emperor Xuan, court officials led by Liu Fang (刘昉) and Zheng Yi amended the edict containing Emperor Xuan's will, making Yang Jian (the later Emperor Wen of Sui) chancellor and chief counselor for the young Emperor Jing. Yan Zhiyi, knowing that this was not Emperor Xuan's true intentions, refused to join in the plot. Later, after Yang Jian had become chancellor and regent, he asked Yan Zhiyi for the Imperial Seal. Yan replied with a stern expression, "The Seal belongs to the Emperor; why is the Chancellor demanding to possess it?" Yang Jian was so angered by the reply that he ordered Yan to be dragged out and executed. However, remembering and apprehending Yan's excellent reputation with the people, Yang Jian halted the execution.

=== During the Sui dynasty ===
In 585, Yan Zhitui was made Inspector of Ji Prefecture (集州, in today Nanjiang County, Sichuan).

== Family ==
Yan Zhiyi is a member of the noble Yan clan of Langya (琅琊颜氏), and is a son of Yan Xie (颜协; 498 - 539), son of Yan Jianyuan. Yan Zhiyi had a younger brother, Yan Zhitui.
