= Yanhu Township =

Yanhu Township 盐湖乡
- Township
- Location within Tibet
- Coordinates: 32°31′07″N 82°28′48″E
- Country: China
- Region: Tibet
- Prefecture: Ngari
- County: Gê'gyai

Population
  - Total
  - Major Nationalities: Tibetan
  - Regional dialect: Tibetan language
- Time zone: UTC+8 (China Standard)

Yanhu Township (simplified Chinese: 盐湖乡; traditional Chinese: 鹽湖鄉; pinyin: Yánhú Xiāng; lit. 'salt lake') is a township in the east of Gê'gyai County, western Tibet Autonomous Region, People's Republic of China.

== See also ==
- List of towns and villages in Tibet
