= Yan Zhitui =

Chinese artist-scholar (531–591)

Yan Zhitui (Chinese: 顏之推; pinyin: Yán Zhītuī; Wade–Giles: Yen^{2} Chih^{1}-t'ui^{1}, 531–591?) courtesy name Jie (Chinese: 介) was a Chinese calligrapher, painter, musician, writer, philosopher and politician who served four different Chinese states during the late Northern and Southern dynasties: the Liang dynasty in southern China, the Northern Qi and Northern Zhou dynasties of northern China, and their successor state that reunified China, the Sui dynasty. Yan Zhitui was a supporter of Buddhism in China despite criticism by many of his Confucian-taught peers.

== Family background ==
Yan Zhitui's ancestors were originally from Linyi in modern-day Shandong Province. His family belonged to the aristocratic Yan clan of Langya (琅琊顏氏). After the fall of the Jin dynasty's capital city of Chang'an during the Uprising of the Five Barbarians, the Yan family migrated south below the Yangtze River in 317. At the Eastern Jin's new capital of Jiankang (modern-day Nanjing) the Yan family became prominent amongst the elite families. The Yan family provided many officials that served the governments of the Eastern Jin dynasty and the succeeding Southern Dynasties in southern China. There was one dissident of the Yan family, though; upon the transition of the Southern Qi to Liang regimes in April to May 502, Yan Zhitui's grandfather Yan Jianyuan refused to serve the Liang court out of continuing loyalty to the Southern Qi. When Emperor Wu of Liang assumed the throne and control over southern China, Yan Jianyuan starved himself to death in an act of piety towards the dynasty he once served. Despite this act of devotion from his grandfather, his father Yan Xie decided to serve Emperor Wu and the new Liang dynasty. Yan Zhiyi and Yan Zhisan were his older brothers.

== Descendants ==
He had three sons: Yan Silu, Yan Minchu and Yan Youqin.

== Life ==
Yan Zhitui's father Yan Xie died in 539, when he was only nine years old (by East Asian reckoning). Without a father figure to guide or support him, Yan was raised largely by his elder brother. In his teenage years, Yan served as a lowly court attendant in the southern capital at Jiankang. Yet, when he was eighteen years old the infamous military general Hou Jing came to power in southern China in a rebellion against the Liang dynasty. Yan and a royal prince narrowly escaped execution once they were made prisoners of Hou Jing.

In 552, Yan Zhitui fled to Jiangling (江陵, in what is modern Jingzhou, Hubei), accompanying the Liang prince he served prior to Hou Jing's revolt. The Liang prince established a rival court, yet it was destroyed when Western Wei invaded from the north and captured Jiangling in January 555. At age twenty-four, Yan Zhitui had become an enslaved prisoner of war, carted off with 100,000 others to the Western Wei capital of Chang'an.

In 556, his family managed to escape Chang'an, and prepared to move east in hopes of returning to the Liang dynasty over southern China. However, the Chen dynasty would overthrown the Liang dynasty in the south with the ascension of Emperor Wu of Chen in November 557. Much like his grandfather who had refused to serve Liang once it usurped control from the Southern Qi state, Yan Zhitui decided not to serve the new Chen regime. Instead, Yan Zhitui was accepted in several court positions serving the Northern Qi dynasty in northeastern China. Yet, fate would have it that Yan would be forced to move again, this time after the Northern Zhou defeated the Northern Qi in February 577, becoming the sole ruling dynasty over northern China. At age forty-six, Yan Zhitui moved back to Chang'an where he had once spent time in captivity. For the next several years he was not appointed to any governmental posts, and suffered for a brief time in a state of poverty. When the Sui dynasty headed by Emperor Wen of Sui usurped control in the north from the Northern Zhou dynasty, Yan Zhitui was once again recognized and appointed to several scholarly and ministerial posts.

== Written works ==
In his 26-chapter book Yanshi jiaxun《顏氏家訓》"The Family Instructions of Master Yan"), Yan Zhitui left an entire written compendium of his own philosophy and life-advice to his sons, advising them on which paths to take and which paths to avoid to gain success in life. In addition, he also made observations about the differences between Northern and Southern China of his time, especially in regards to language, customs, and culture. He wrote that he formed many bad habits in life that took years to overcome because his elder brother had not been strict enough with him in the absence of their father. He stressed the need to acquire a good education, since well-educated ministers were chosen for posts, while others who had prestigious family lines for centuries wound up working on farms or tending to horses in the stable if they were not properly educated. Although he stressed the need for mastering calligraphy, painting, and playing the musical instrument of the lute (guqin), he warned against them from practicing too much and gaining too much skill. This was because those of higher rank, in a degrading and humiliating fashion, could easily call upon them to constantly entertain and produce fanciful calligraphy, poetry, or a musical song on the spot. Yan Zhitui was an antiquarian when it came to the prized calligraphy in his family's collection, with written pieces in his possession that were originally penned by the masters of early calligraphy, Wang Xizhi and his son Wang Xianzhi.

In his writing, Yan Zhitui also supported Buddhism. Yan defended it against many peers who were staunch critics of the religion, despite Yan's own emphasis on Confucian learning and education. Yan also required of his sons that his funeral be accompanied by Buddhist services, and persuaded his sons not to offer meat in traditional ancestral offerings. Although he called upon his sons to observe and respect the teachings of Buddhism, he did not want them to lead a remote and isolated monastic life, as he still had expectations that his sons should marry and have families of their own. He did, however, encourage them to:

...attend to the chanting and reading of the sacred books and thereby provide for passage to your future state of existence. Incarnation as a human is difficult to attain. Do not pass through yours in vain!

Although paper had been known as a wrapping and padding material in China since the 2nd century BC, an early reference to the use of paper for toilet purposes was made by Yan. In 589 AD Yan Zhitui wrote:

"Paper on which there are quotations or commentaries from Five Classics or the names of sages, I dare not use for toilet purposes".
