= Bắc Ninh Temple of Literature =

Confucian temple in Bắc Ninh Province, Vietnam

Văn Miếu Bắc Ninh (Bắc Ninh Temple of Literature) is a Confucian temple located in Bắc Ninh Province, Vietnam. Bắc Ninh Temple of Literature is famous for its large –scale with 677 graduateships of the pre-court competition- examination, occupied one third in the whole country.

The Temple of Literature was worthy demonstrations of the age-old Kinh Bac civilization. It symbolizes the intellectual curiosity of the inhabitants of Bắc Ninh province which happens to be the province with the largest number of doctors appointed under the Vietnamese feudal system. Bắc Ninh, alone, accounted for one third of all national appointments.
