= Cangzhou Confucius Temple =

Temple in Cangzhou, Hebei, China

- 沧州文庙

Religion
- Affiliation: Confucianism

Location
- Location: Cangzhou, Hebei

Architecture
- Style: Ming Dynasty
- Founder: Ji Weiren

Cangzhou Confucius Temple (simplified Chinese: 沧州文庙; traditional Chinese: 滄州文廟), or Cangzhou Confucian Temple, is a Confucian temple located in the east of Xiaoshi Street, Cangzhou City. It was founded by Ji Weiren (纪惟仁), an Administrative Assistant (判官) of Cangzhou, in the first year of Hongwu in the Ming Dynasty (1368).

== General information ==
Cangzhou Confucius Temple is a Ming Dynasty building complex, facing south, 110.5 meters long from north to south, 37.2 meters wide from east to west, covering an area of 4,110 square meters, with a construction area of 1,986 square meters.

== History ==
After the founding of Cangzhou Confucius Temple, it has been repaired and expanded several times, but most of the monuments were destroyed for historical reasons.
