= Jingzhou Confucius Temple =

Confucian temple in China

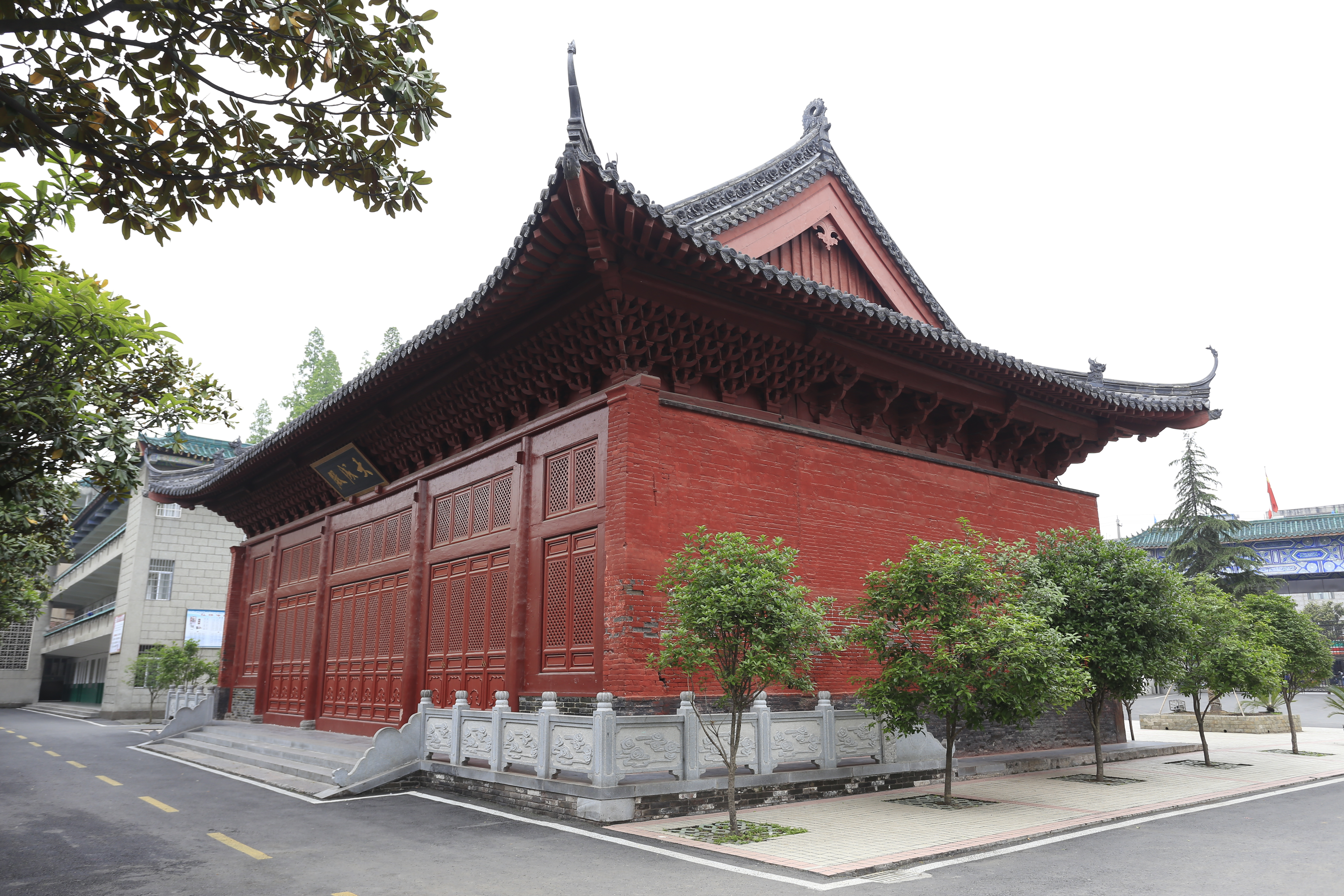
- Dacheng Hall of Jingzhou Confucius Temple

- Location within Hubei Location within China

Religion
- Affiliation: Confucianism

Location
- Location: Jingzhou, Hubei
- Interactive map of Jingzhou Confucius Temple
- Coordinates: 30°21′16″N 112°10′48″E

Jingzhou Confucius Temple (simplified Chinese: 荆州文庙; traditional Chinese: 荊州文廟), or Jingzhou Confucian Temple, previously Confucian Temple of Jiangling County (江陵县文庙), is a Confucian temple located in Jingzhou Experimental Middle School (荆州市实验中学), Jingzhong Road, Jingzhou District, Jingzhou City, Hubei Province.

Completed in 1725, Jingzhou Confucius Temple was severely damaged by the invading Japanese army during the Second Sino-Japanese War, and then underwent restorations. It is the only existing Confucian temple in Jingzhou.

== History ==
The construction of Jingzhou Confucius Temple began in the 60th year of the Kangxi in the Qing Dynasty (1721), and was completed in 1725.

During the Second Sino-Japanese War, when the Japanese invasion army occupied Jingzhou, the Jingzhou Confucius Temple was destroyed and the relics inside the temple were looted by the Japanese army. Now, only the Dacheng Hall (大成殿) and the Lattice Star Gate (棂星门) remain.

== Conservations ==
After the founding of the People's Republic of China, the Jingzhou local government repaired the Jingzhou Confucius Temple twice in 1953 and 1965.

In 1960, the original Jiangling County Government listed Jingzhou Confucius Temple as a key cultural relic protection unit, and in 2008 it was designated as a provincial cultural relic protection unit in Hubei Province.

== Gallery ==
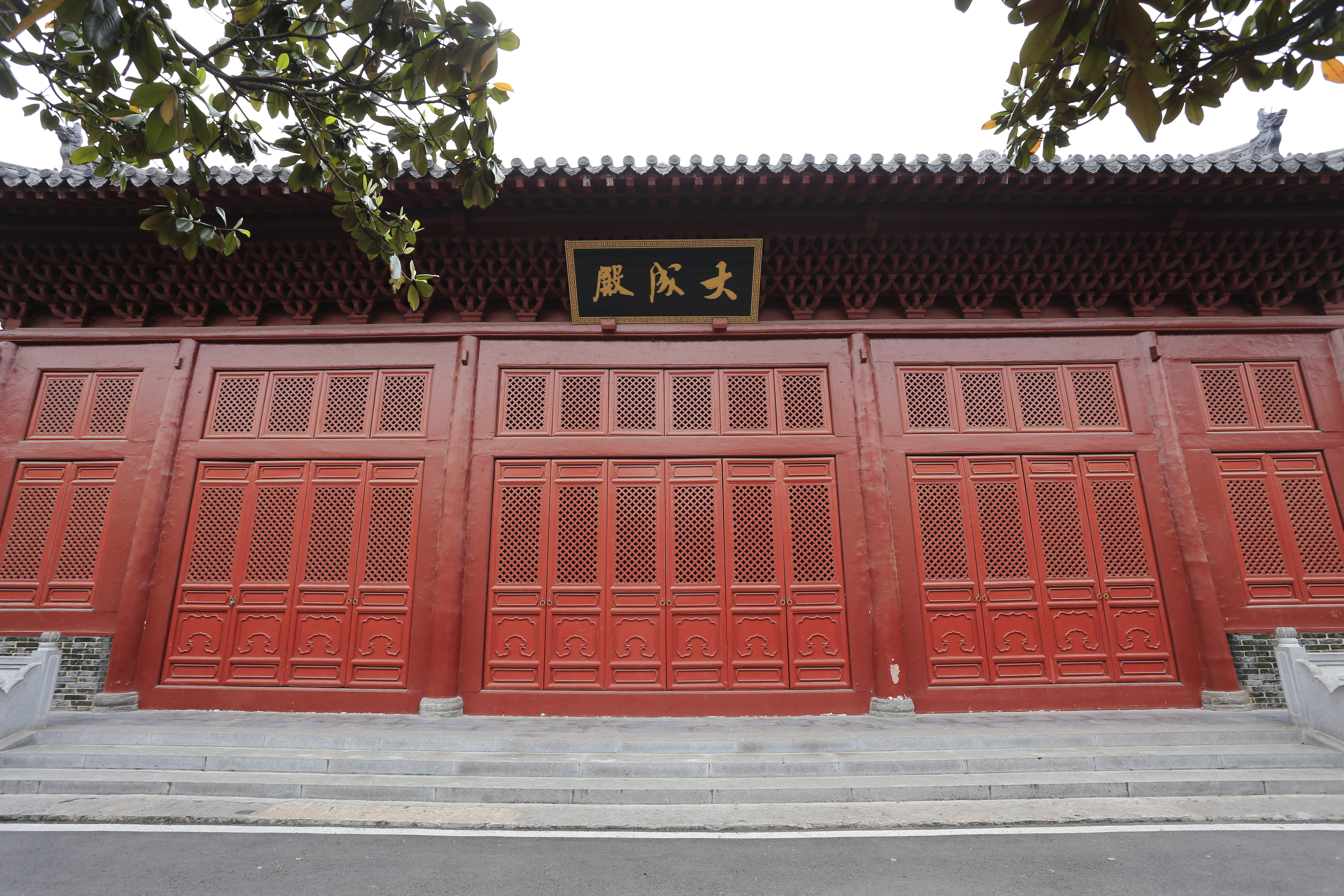

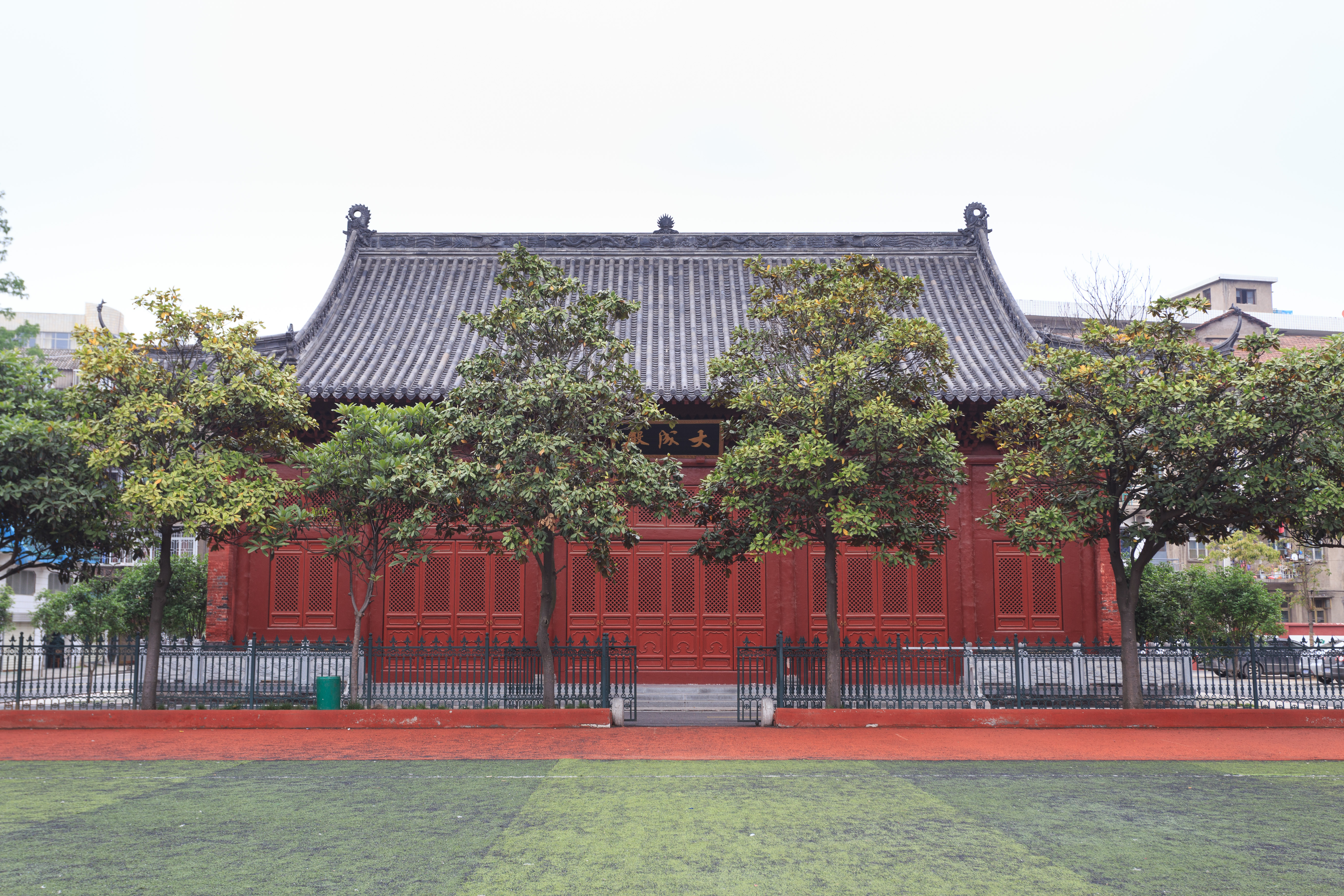
