= Ürümqi Confucius temple =

Confucian temple in Xinjiang, China

Ürümqi Confucius Temple
- Ürümçi Kûñzi İbadet Xanısı
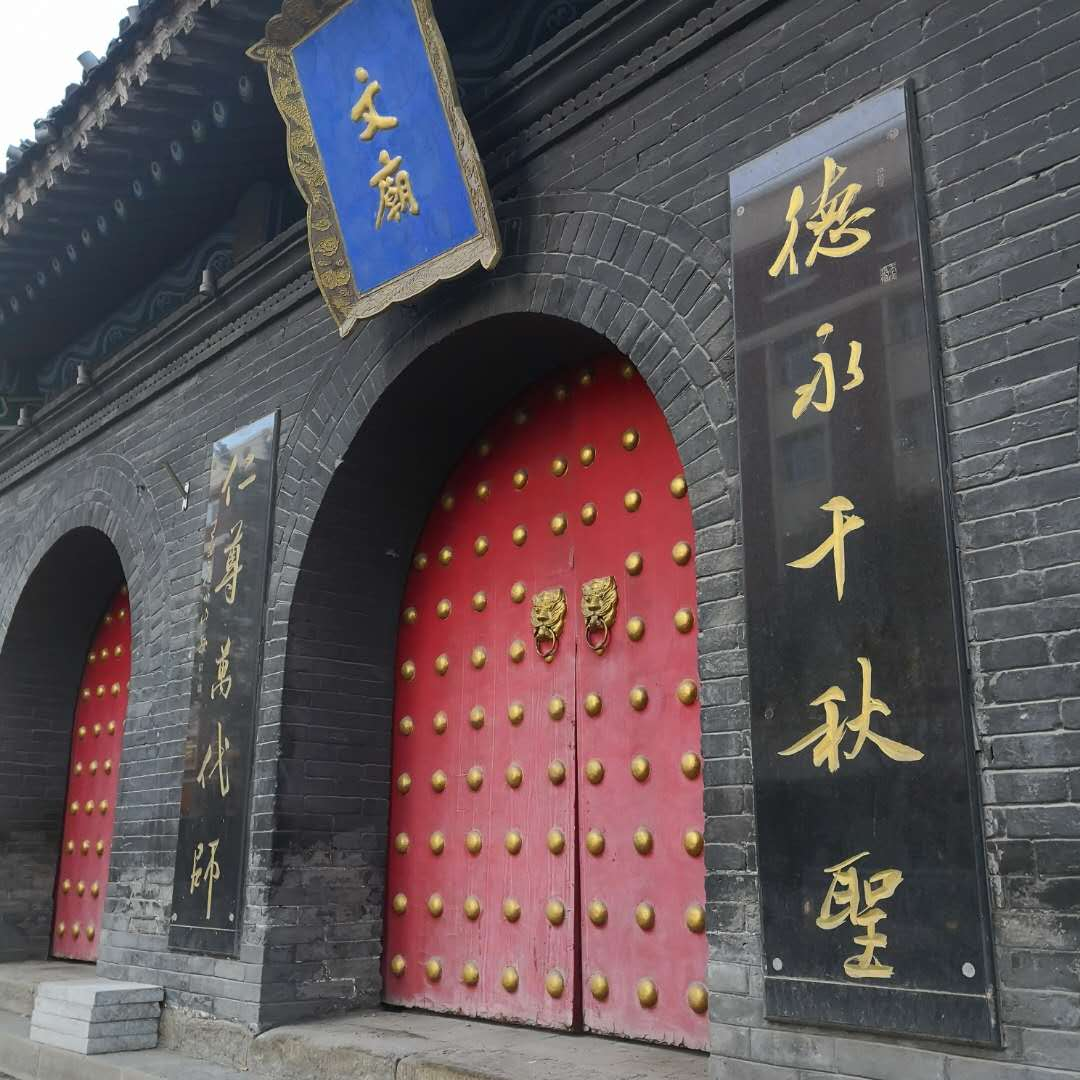

Religion
- Affiliation: Confucianism

Location
- Location: No. 15, north side of Qianjin Road, Tianshan, Urumqi, Xinjiang
- Interactive map of Ürümqi Confucius Temple
- Coordinates: 43.8012°N 87.6265°E

Architecture
- Established: Late Qing dynasty

Ürümqi Confucius Temple (uyghur:Ürümçi Kûñzi İbadet Xanısı)also known as Urumqi Confucian Temple) is a Confucian temple located at No. 15, north side of Qianjin Road (前进路), Tianshan District, Ürümqi, Xinjiang, China. Built in the late Qing dynasty, it is the only well-preserved Qing dynasty style temple complex in Xinjiang, and the only remaining Confucian temple in Xinjiang.

The Ürümqi Confucius Temple was built on Culture Road (previously Confucius Temple Lane) in 1765–1767, when the Qing government expanded the Dihua New City (迪化新城, now Urumqi City). Originally known as the "God Temple" (上帝庙), it was rebuilt in 1922 (the 11th year of the Republic of China), dedicated mainly to God and secondarily to Confucius. In 1945, the main hall of the God Temple was rebuilt as the Confucius Dacheng Hall (孔子大成殿).

In 1979, the temple was listed as a municipal-level cultural relic protection unit in Urumqi. In October 2019, it was included as the eighth batch of China's Major Historical and Cultural Site Protected at the National Level.

== History ==
In 1769, Wen Fuzeng, the then-minister of affairs in Urumqi (then known as Dihua), made a memorial and planned to build a school and a Confucian temple in the city. That spring, though the temple was not yet completed, the spring memorial ceremony began. This was the first time that the Confucian sacrifice ceremony was held in Dihua in the Qing dynasty. In 1773, the Confucian Temple was established on the east of Dongguanxiang Street, and the construction of school palaces began in various parts of Xinjiang.

Following the Muslim conquest of the city in 1864 during the Dungan Revolt, most of the Confucian temples and schools built during the Qianlong period were destroyed. Of those remaining, a few were converted into mosques. The city was recaptured by Qing forces led by Zuo Zongtang in 1876, restoring Qing dominance in Xinjiang. In 1879, Zhou Chongfu, Yin of Zhendi Road, built the Confucian temple on Chengxi Street. In 1890, the Qing government rebuilt the Dihua Confucian Temple into an ancient building with a certain scale. Every spring and autumn, officials of the Qing government organized a ceremony to worship Confucius in the temple.

After the founding of the Republic of China, the ruler of Xinjiang, Yang Zengxin, also made sacrifices to Confucianism at the Dihua Confucian Temple. In 1922, the temple was moved from Zhixi Street to Xinmancheng East Street, which was inside the East Gate of Dihua at that time.

Yang Zengxin viewed Confucianism, Christianity, and Islam as all worshipping the god of heaven; and thus, that all believers could worship one God. Therefore, Yang Zengxin changed the name of the Confucian temple to "God Temple". After Sheng Shicai came to power, the temples in Dihua were repurposed, and their property and land were handed over to the Han Nationality Cultural Promotion Association. In 1933, the God Temple was converted into a warehouse. After the Kuomintang took over Xinjiang in 1945, the God Temple was renovated into a Confucian temple, and the offering of sacrifices to Confucius was resumed. Some documents say that the God Temple was formerly known as the "Huanghua Pavilion", the "Longevity Palace", or the "Martyrs' Shrine". While some scholars believe that the Confucian temple is synonymous with the Huanghua Pavilion—based on studies of its function, places of worship, and location—this is not the case with either the Longevity Palace or the Martyrs' Shrine; these claims may be misrepresented.

In September 1991, the Confucian temple was opened as part of the Ürümqi City Museum. The museum is affiliated to the Ürümqi City Cultural Bureau.

== Building ==
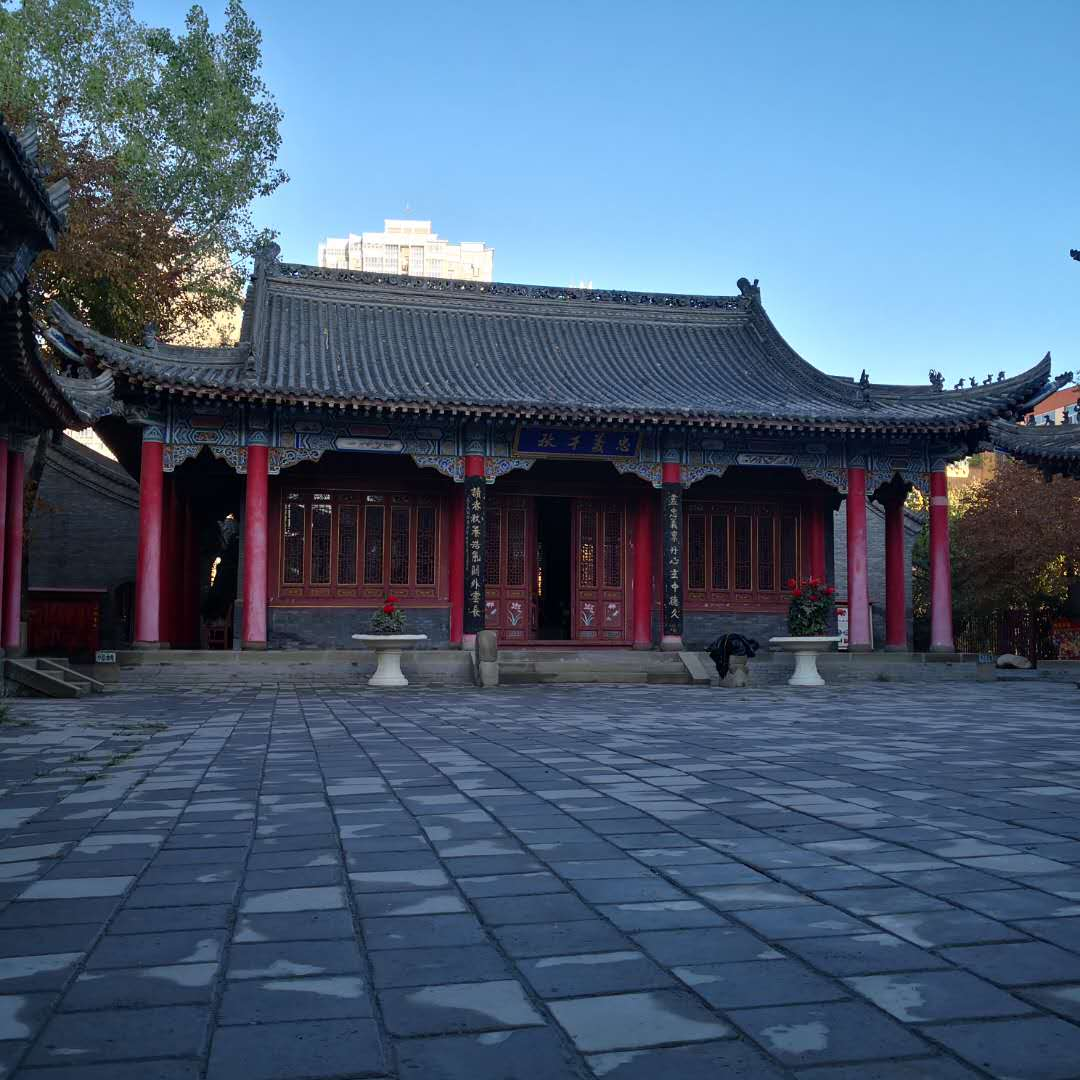
Guandi Hall

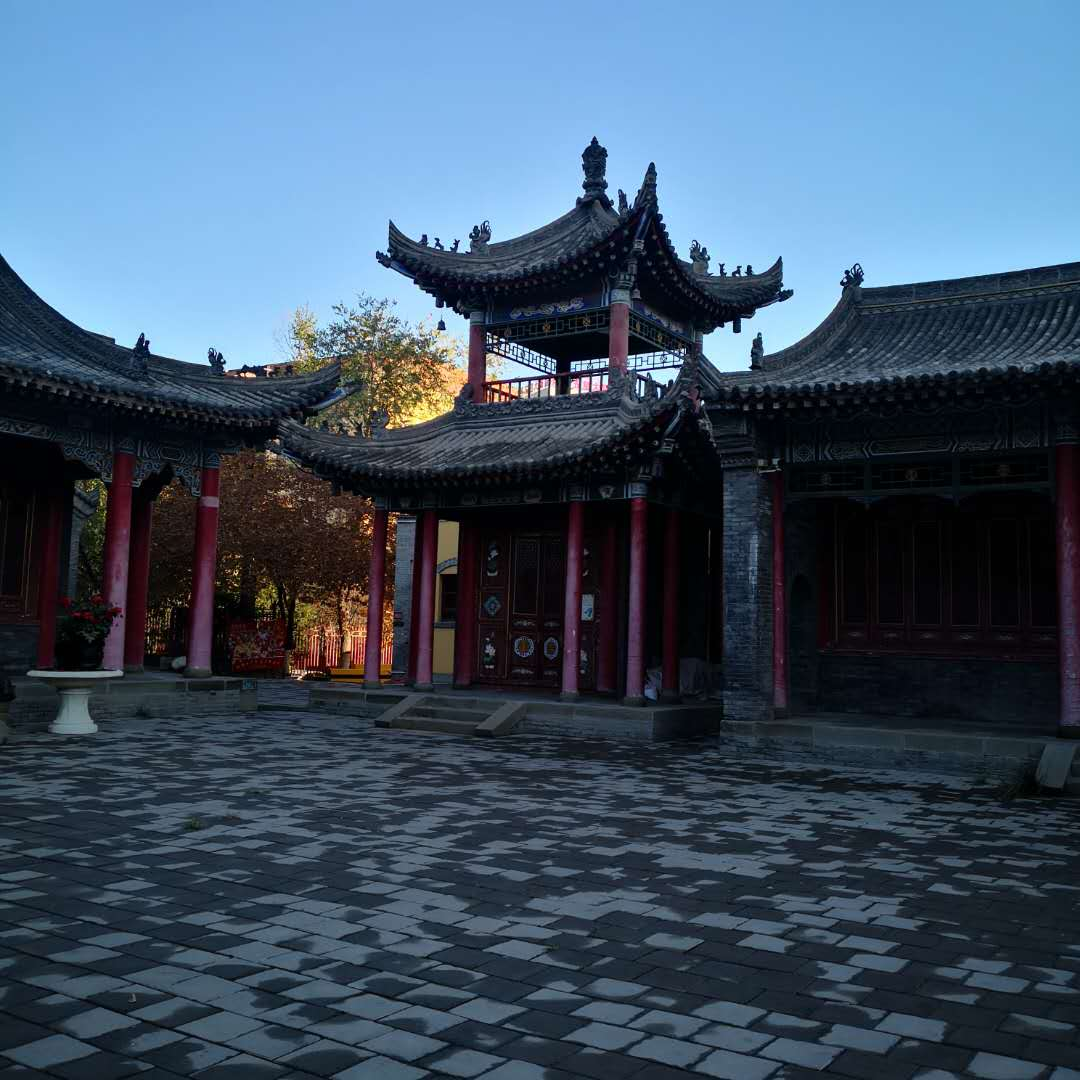
Bell Tower

Confucian temples do not have a standardized ritual system. Most Confucian temples have three courtyards, while the Urumqi Confucian Temple only has two; the second courtyard contains fewer buildings than other Confucian temples. The temple's area is also much smaller than other famous Confucian temples: only about 2,800 square meters, with a construction area of 900 square meters. Similar to other Confucian temples, the Ürümqi Confucian Temple is highly symmetrical, with the central axis as the benchmark. It sits north to south, the roof is a beam-lifting frame, the single eaves rest on the top of the mountain, and the heads of animals such as lions and hippos are placed on the main ridge and vertical ridge. His Highness has a very high pedestal.

The main entrance of the Confucian Temple is the starting point of the central axis, with a width of more than 13 meters and a depth of more than 5 meters. In front of the door is a dismounting stele engraved with the themes of qin, chess, calligraphy, and painting. On the east and west sides are the Manzi Gates, named "Ruihe" and "Fuzhen" respectively. The Guandi (Front) Hall has three rooms about 16 meters wide and less than 10 meters deep. It is rectangular, surrounded by 28 red columns and a corridor with a width of 1.5 meters. The carved animal heads on the roof ridge are of a lion, Tianma, hippopotamus, fish holding, and bullfighting. Among them, the ridge on the east is in disrepair, and the lion has fallen. The Dacheng (Main) Hall has three rooms over 16 meters wide and 11 meters deep. It is convex in shape, surrounded by a corridor composed of 30 red columns; the base is 0.8 meters high, and the beasts on the roof are dragons. In the hall, there are statues or reliefs of Confucius, Si Pei, and Twelve Philosophers. There are also plaques such as "The Master of the World" and "The Life and the People". There is a white elm tree in front of the door, named "Ancient and Famous Tree". The Bell Tower (east) and Drum Tower (west) are symmetrical; both are two-story buildings with four corners and spires, with the first floor housing a bell or drum and the second floor empty. The platform is 0.45 meters high, surrounded by 16 red columns, and a corridor with a width of 1.5 meters. The front bay is 2.16 meters and has four doors. The sides are masonry gables with openwork windows, and the back is a grey solid brick wall.

== Protection ==
In 1979, the Ürümqi Confucian Temple was designated as a municipal-level cultural relics protection unit in Ürümqi. From 1988 to 1990, large-scale maintenance and repair work was carried out with an investment of one million yuan. In 2013, the Ürümqi Cultural Relics Bureau spent three months and 4 million yuan to repair the temple. In 2014, the temple was included in the seventh batch of autonomous region-level cultural relics protection units. In 2016, temple roof tiles fell off, and it was closed for repair. On 16 October 2019, the Confucian Temple was listed as the eighth batch of national key cultural relics protection units.

The main function of Ürümqi Confucian Temple is to worship Confucius and promote Confucian culture. However, it also provides a sacrifice space for the two saints of culture and martial arts. The Guandi Hall in the first half is the sacrifice space for "Wu Sheng", and the Dacheng Hall in the second half is the space for "Sacrificing Confucius". Other Han culture rituals are promoted here to various deities such as the God of Wealth, the Taibaijinxing, the God of Earth, and the Goddess of Mercy. In addition, the Ürümqi Confucian Temple also hosts different festivals and celebrations. During the Lunar New Year and the Spring Festival, the temple holds fairs that include fire performances, sending Spring Festival couplets, and listening to opera. During the Qingming Festival, the temple holds poetry and ancestor worship activities. During the Dragon Boat Festival, zongzi are made in the Confucian Temple. During the Mid-Autumn Festival, people will worship the moon and make moon cakes in the temple.
