= Confucius Shrine, Nagasaki =

Confucian temple in Nagasaki, Japan

Coordinates: 32.73549°N 129.872695°E

Confucius Shrine in Nagasaki

Kōshi-byō (孔子廟) is a Confucian temple in Nagasaki, Japan. Today the land on which it stands is owned by the Chinese Embassy in Tokyo.

First built in 1893 by Chinese residents of Nagasaki with the support of the Qing dynasty government, the shrine was designed to serve as a place of worship and learning for the Chinese community, and housed a Confucian sanctuary and primary school. The buildings were severely damaged by the atomic bomb explosion on August 9, 1945 and were not restored and opened to the public until September 1967. The shrine was extensively renovated in 1982. Standing outside the shrine are 72 statues representing the 72 followers of Confucius.

A building at the rear of the shrine houses the Museum of Chinese History and Palace Museum. It features large illuminated photographs of the old Silk Road and models of early Chinese inventions such as the world's first seismograph. Displayed on the second floor are more than 80 treasure-class articles of varying antiquity on loan directly from the Chinese National Museum and Palace Museum in Beijing.
