= Xích Đằng Temple of Literature =

Confucian temple in Vietnam

Coordinates: 20.661944°N 106.048889°E

- Văn miếu Xích Đằng
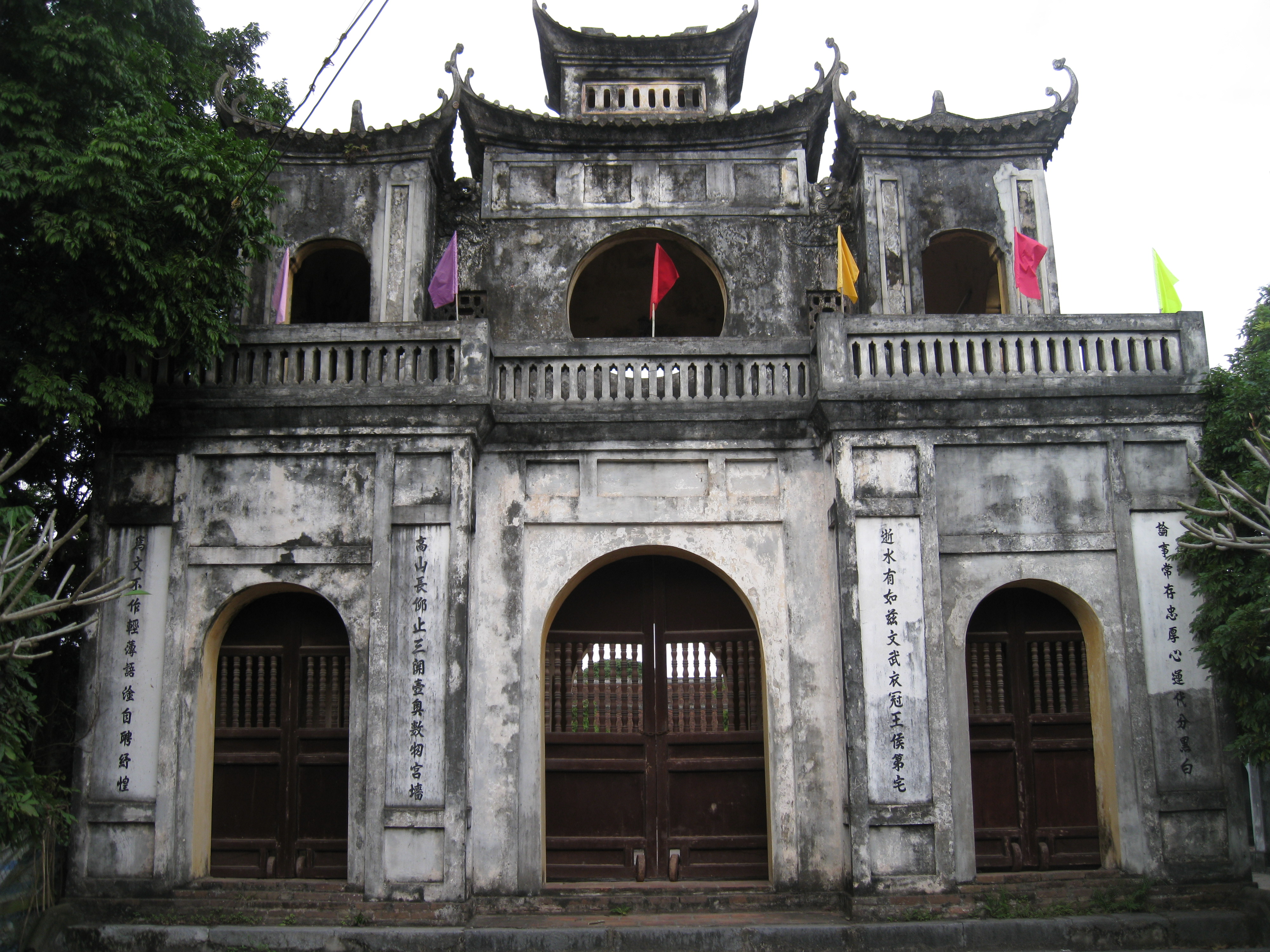
- Gate of Văn miếu Xích Đằng

Religion
- Affiliation: Confucianism
- Province: Hưng Yên
- Festivals: 10 February & 10 August

Location
- Location: Lê Quý Đôn, Lam Sơn Ward
- Municipality: Hưng Yên
- Country: Vietnam
- Interactive map of Xích Đằng Temple of Literature

Architecture
- Established: 1831

Văn miếu Xích Đằng is a Confucian temple located in Hưng Yên City. It is also known as Văn Miếu Hưng Yên. The Văn miếu Xích Đằng was built in 1832, and belongs to the province now located in Hưng Yên City, province of Hưng Yên.

== History ==
The Văn miếu Xích Đằng received its name because it was built in the Xích Đằng village. The Confucius temple was established in 1831 in the Hưng Yên province. It began construction from the seventeenth century, and was restored and embellished by the Nguyễn emperor, Minh Mạng. Remnants of the temple still remain today which consists of two buildings known as Phương Trượng Tower and Tịnh Mãn Tower.

== Festivals and holidays ==
Two traditional temple festival seasons were used to be held on 10 February and 10 August, which are known as lunar calendar dates. The temple organizes cultural activities on the first day of spring, such as worship ceremonies, offering incense, calligraphy exhibitions, ca tru singing, which altogether gradually restores the ancient festival. In the second day of the Lunar New Year, calligraphy exhibits are high on demand in the Xích Đằng Confucius Temple festival, similar to that of the Văn Miếu in Hanoi.
