= Mao Điền Temple of Literature =

Confucian temple

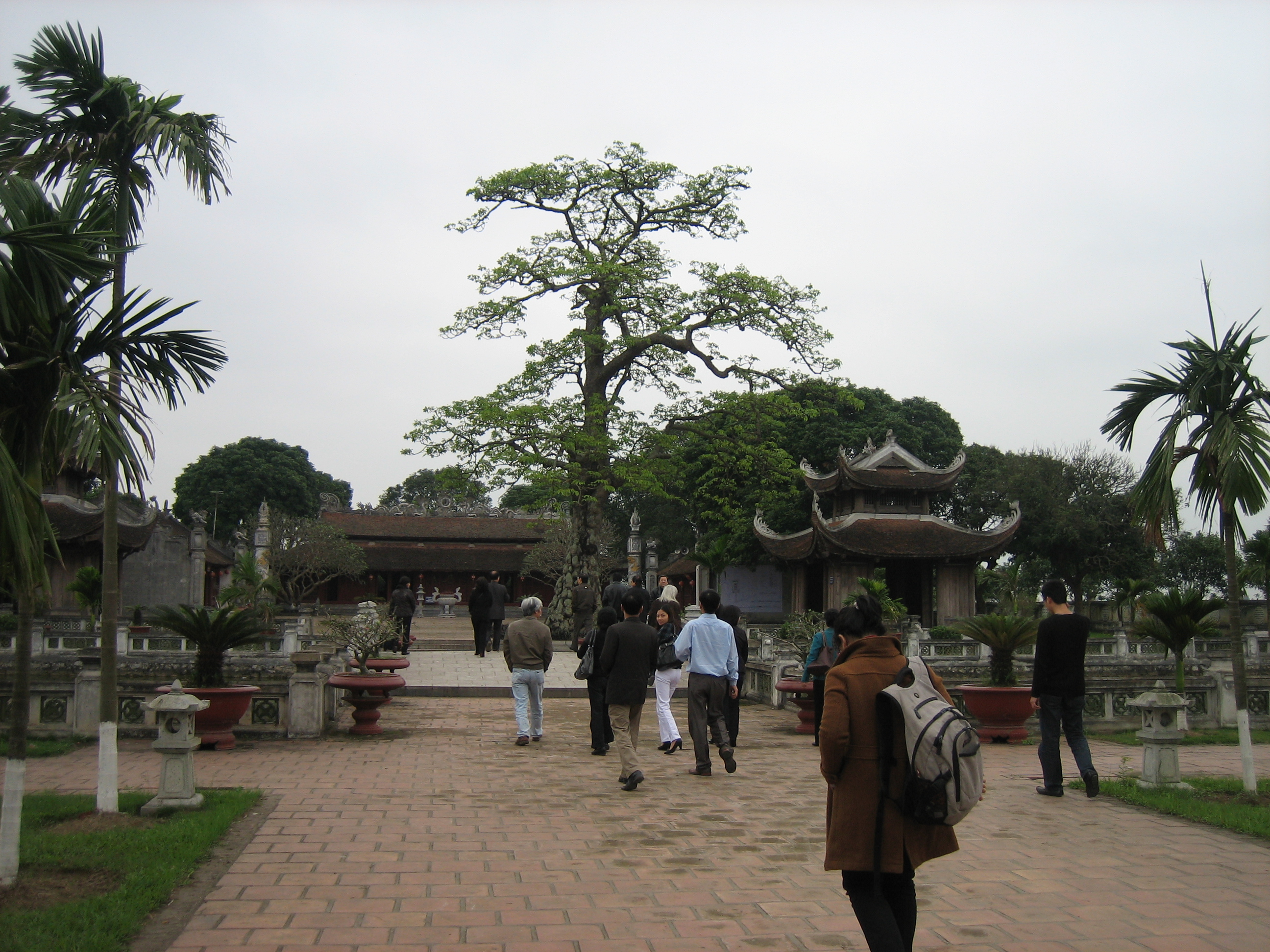
Văn Miếu Mao Điền

Văn Miếu Mao Điền is a Confucian temple located in Mậu Tài Village, Cẩm Điền Commune, Cẩm Giàng District, Hải Dương Province, Vietnam. The site was badly damaged and effectively laid waste by French military action in 1948. The temple has recently been further renovated with government funding. The Văn Miếu of Mao Điền, a national antique building, is the second largest literature temple in Vietnam, after the temple in Hanoi.

== Renovation ==
The temple is a place where 600 doctors of Hải Dương province have resided for over 500 years. The Mao Điền Temple served as a symbol of traditional affection for learning, worship for Confucian teachings, and where outstanding Confucian scholars of the province were honored. The People's Committee of the Hải Dương province has planned to spend approximately VND 19 billion to restore the Văn Miếu of Mao Điền, located in Cẩm Giàng district. The restoration project plans to reconstruct roads, parking lots, and build a new stone embankment.
