= Taichung Confucian Temple =

Temple in North, Taichung, Taiwan

- 臺中市孔廟
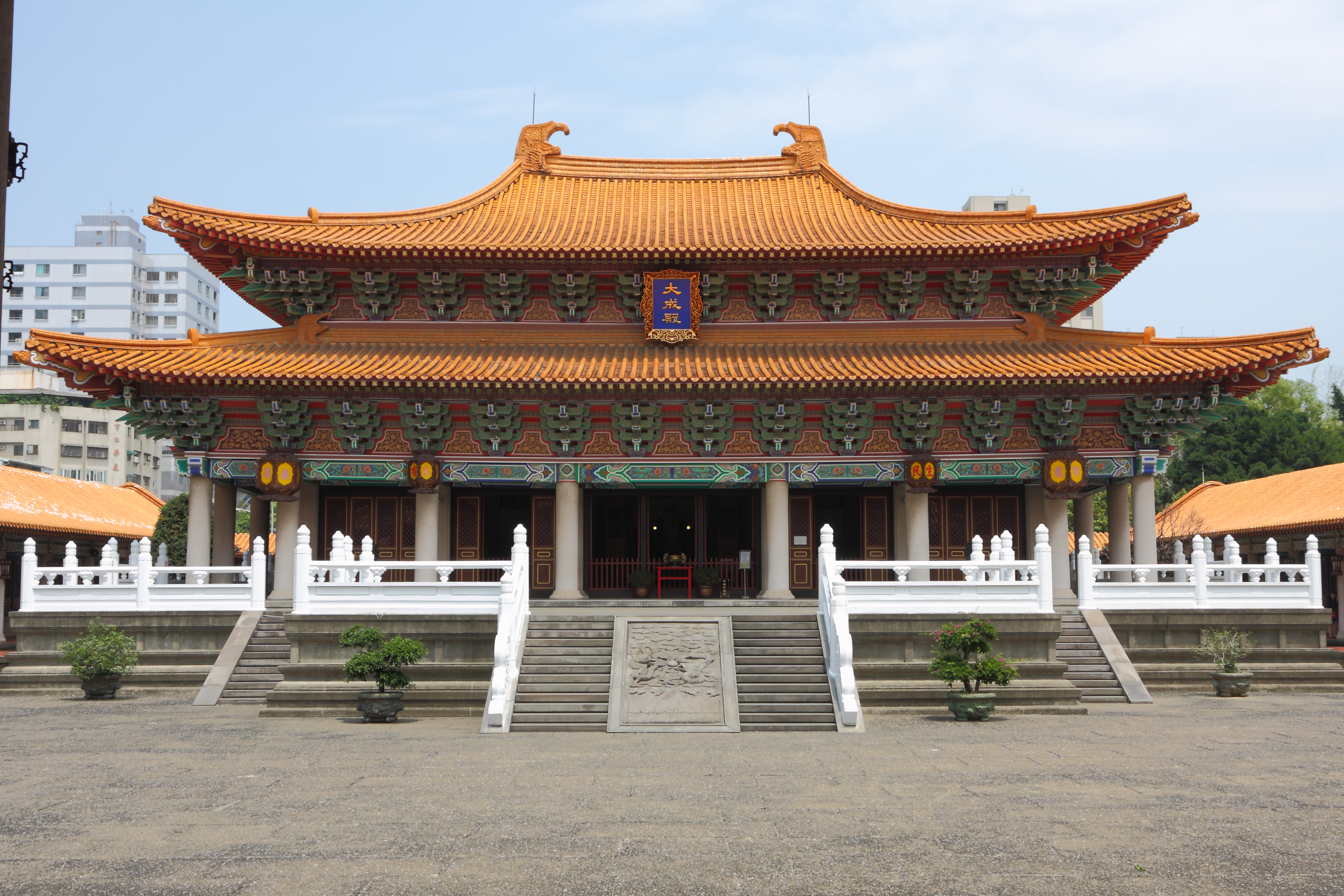

- Location within Taichung

Religion
- Affiliation: Confucianism

Location
- Location: North, Taichung, Taiwan
- Interactive map of Taichung Confucian Temple
- Coordinates: 24°09′15.4″N 120°41′23.9″E

Architecture
- Type: Temple of Confucius
- Style: Song dynasty
- Groundbreaking: 1972
- Completed: 1976
- Site area: 20,000 m^{2}

The Taichung Confucian Temple (traditional Chinese: 臺中市孔廟; simplified Chinese: 台中市孔庙; pinyin: Táizhōng Shì Kǒngmiào) is a Confucian temple in North District, Taichung, Taiwan.

== History ==
The construction of the temple began in 1972 and completed in 1976.

== Architecture ==
The temple was constructed in Song dynasty architectural style following the layout of Qufu Confucian Temple in Shandong. It sits in a 20,000 m^{2} of complex area.

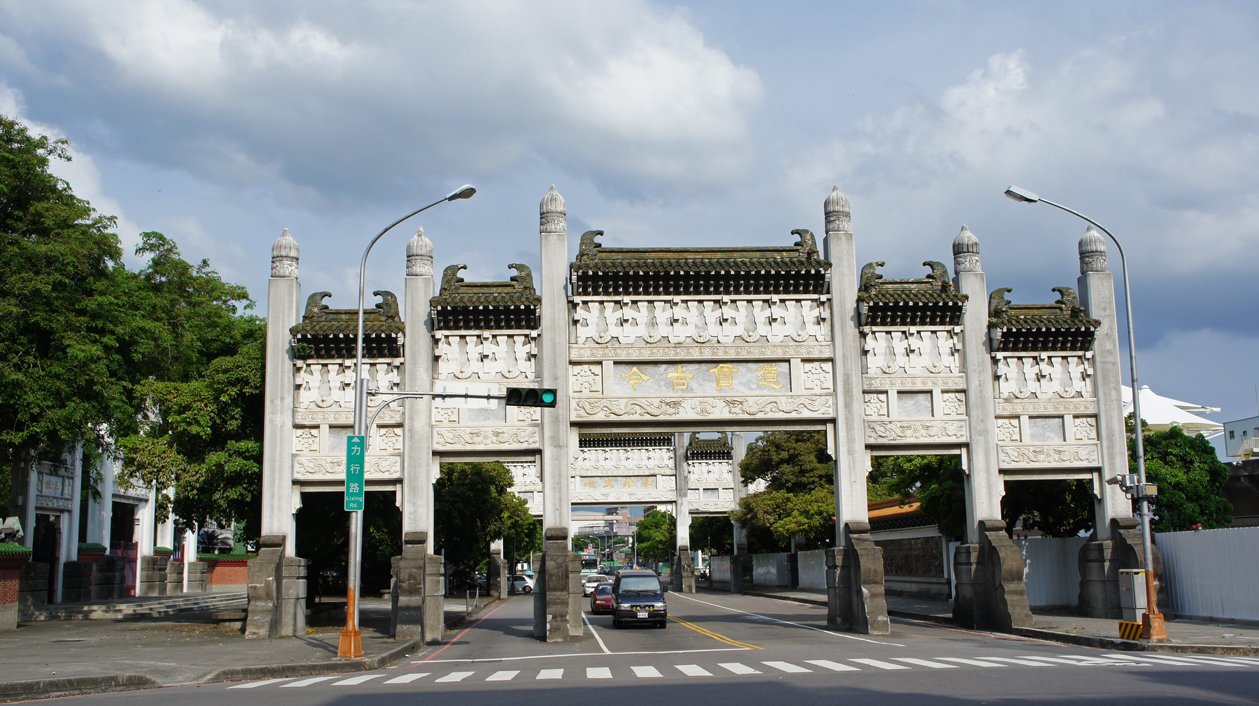
Paifang

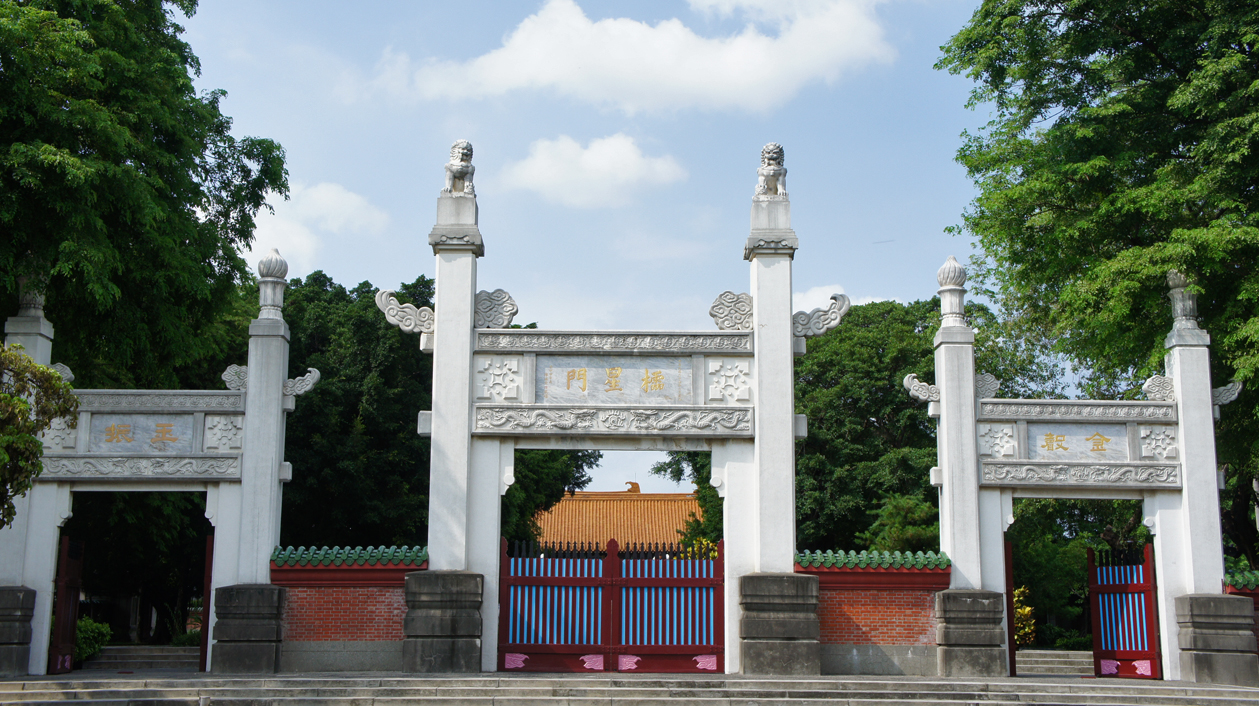
Lixing Gate (櫺星門)

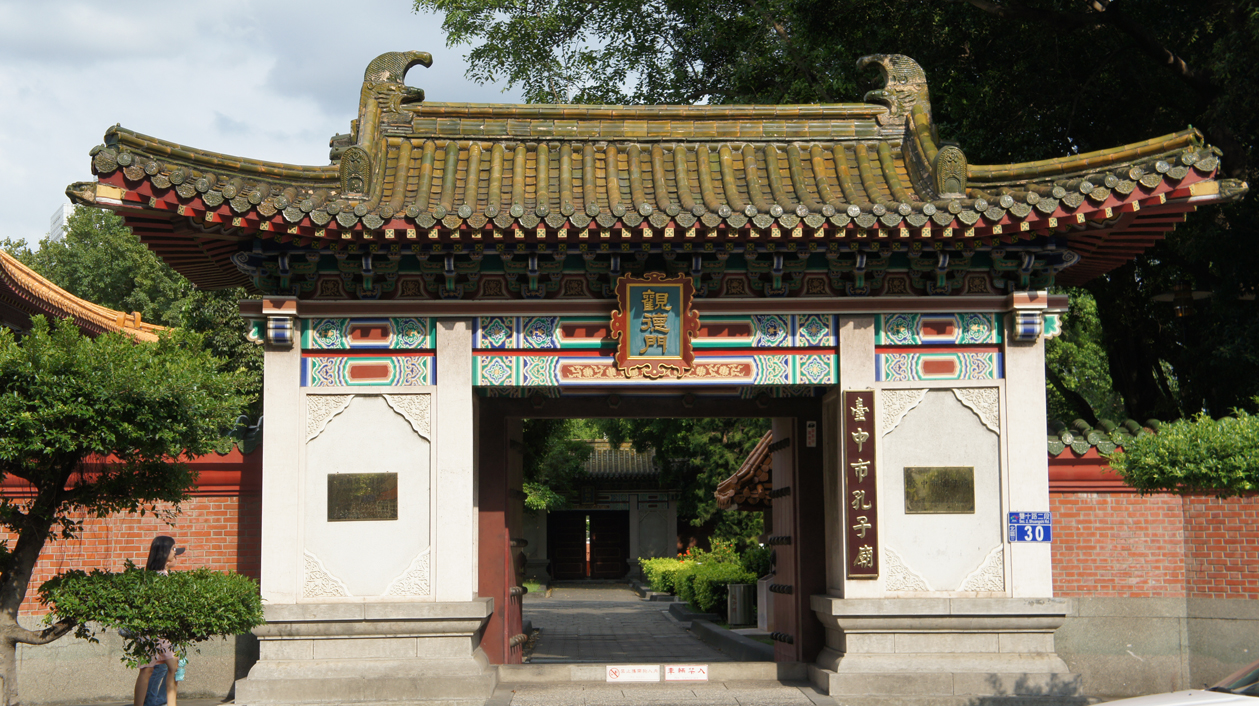
Guande Gate (觀德門)

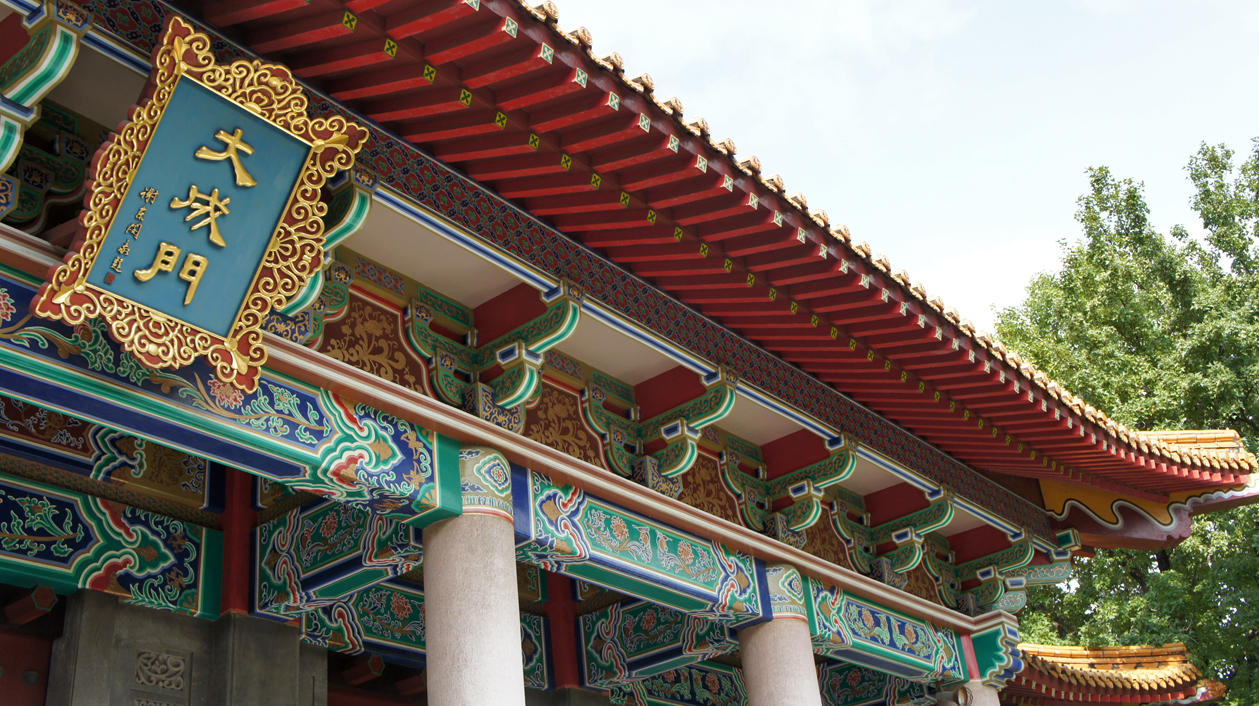
Dacheng Gate (大成門)

== Transportation ==
The temple is within walking distance, north of Taichung Station of Taiwan Railway.

== See also ==
- Temple of Confucius
- List of temples in Taichung
- List of temples in Taiwan
- Religion in Taiwan
