= Temple of Confucius =

Temple to venerate Confucius and Confucian sages and philosophers

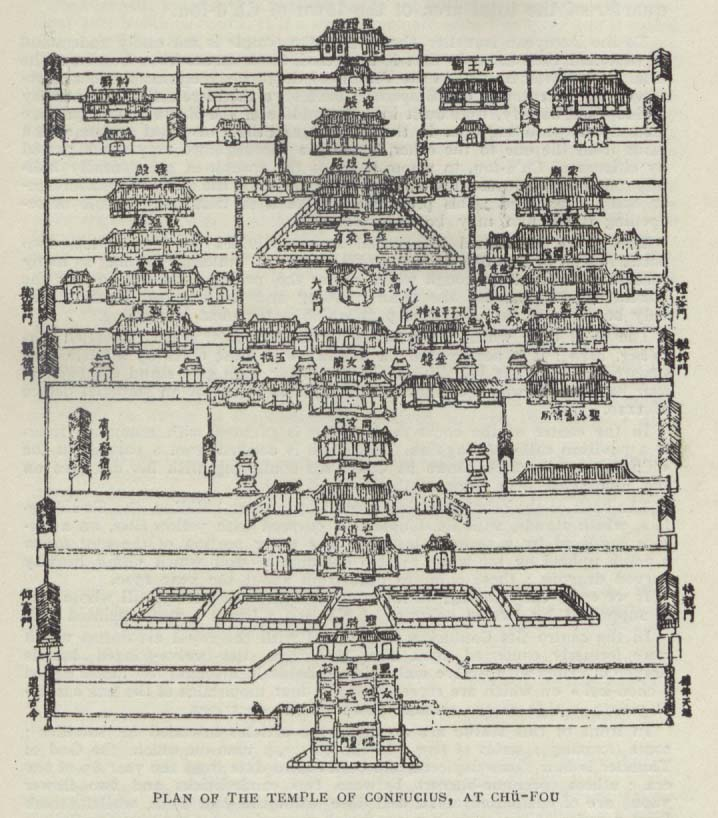
- The Temple of Confucius in Qufu c. 1912

Chinese name
- Traditional Chinese: 孔廟
- Simplified Chinese: 孔庙
- Literal meaning: Temple of Kong
Transcriptions
Standard Mandarin
- Hanyu Pinyin: Kǒngmiào

Temple of Literature
- Traditional Chinese: 文廟
- Simplified Chinese: 文庙
Transcriptions
Standard Mandarin
- Hanyu Pinyin: Wénmiào
Southern Min
- Hokkien POJ: Bûn-biō

Temple of the Sage
- Traditional Chinese: 聖廟
- Simplified Chinese: 圣庙
Transcriptions
Standard Mandarin
- Hanyu Pinyin: Shèngmiào
Southern Min
- Hokkien POJ: Sèng-biō

Temple of the Master
- Traditional Chinese: 夫子廟
- Simplified Chinese: 夫子庙
Transcriptions
Standard Mandarin
- Hanyu Pinyin: Fūzi miào

Temple of Study
- Traditional Chinese: 學廟
- Simplified Chinese: 学庙
Transcriptions
Standard Mandarin
- Hanyu Pinyin: Xuémiào

Palace of Study
- Traditional Chinese: 學宮
- Simplified Chinese: 学宫
Transcriptions
Standard Mandarin
- Hanyu Pinyin: Xuégōng

Vietnamese name
- Vietnamese alphabet: Văn (Thánh) Miếu
- Chữ Hán: 文廟 文(聖)廟
- Literal meaning: Temple of (the Sage of) Literature

Korean name
- Hangul: 문묘 공자묘
- Hanja: 文廟 孔子廟
- Literal meaning: Temple of Literature; Temple of Confucius
Transcriptions
- Revised Romanization: Munmyo; Gongjamyo
- McCune–Reischauer: Munmyo; Kongjamyo

Japanese name
- Kanji: 聖廟 聖堂
Transcriptions
- Romanization: seibyō seidō

Indonesian name
- Indonesian: Boen Bio

Manchu name
- Manchu script: ᡴᡠᠩᡶᡠᡯ ᡳ ᠮᡠᡴᡨᡝᡥᡝᠨ
- Möllendorff: kungfudzi-i muktehen

A temple of Confucius or Confucian temple is a temple for the veneration of Confucius and the sages and philosophers of Confucianism in Chinese folk religion and other East Asian religions. They were formerly the site of the administration of the imperial examination in China, Korea, Japan and Vietnam and often housed schools and other studying facilities.

== Names ==
The temples are known by a variety of names throughout East Asia. The two greatest temples in Qufu and Beijing are now known in Chinese as "Temples of Confucius" (Chinese: 孔廟; pinyin: Kǒngmiào). In some localities, they are known as "Temples of Literature" (Chinese: 文廟; pinyin: wénmiào; Korean pronunciation: munmyo; Vietnamese: văn miếu, Indonesian: boen bio) or "Temples of the Sage of Literature" (Vietnamese: văn thánh miếu). In Southern China, however, temples by that name generally honor Wenchang Wang, a separate deity associated with the scholar Zhang Yazi. In Japan, they are usually known as "Temples" or "Halls of the Sage" (Japanese: seibyō or seidō, respectively).

== History ==
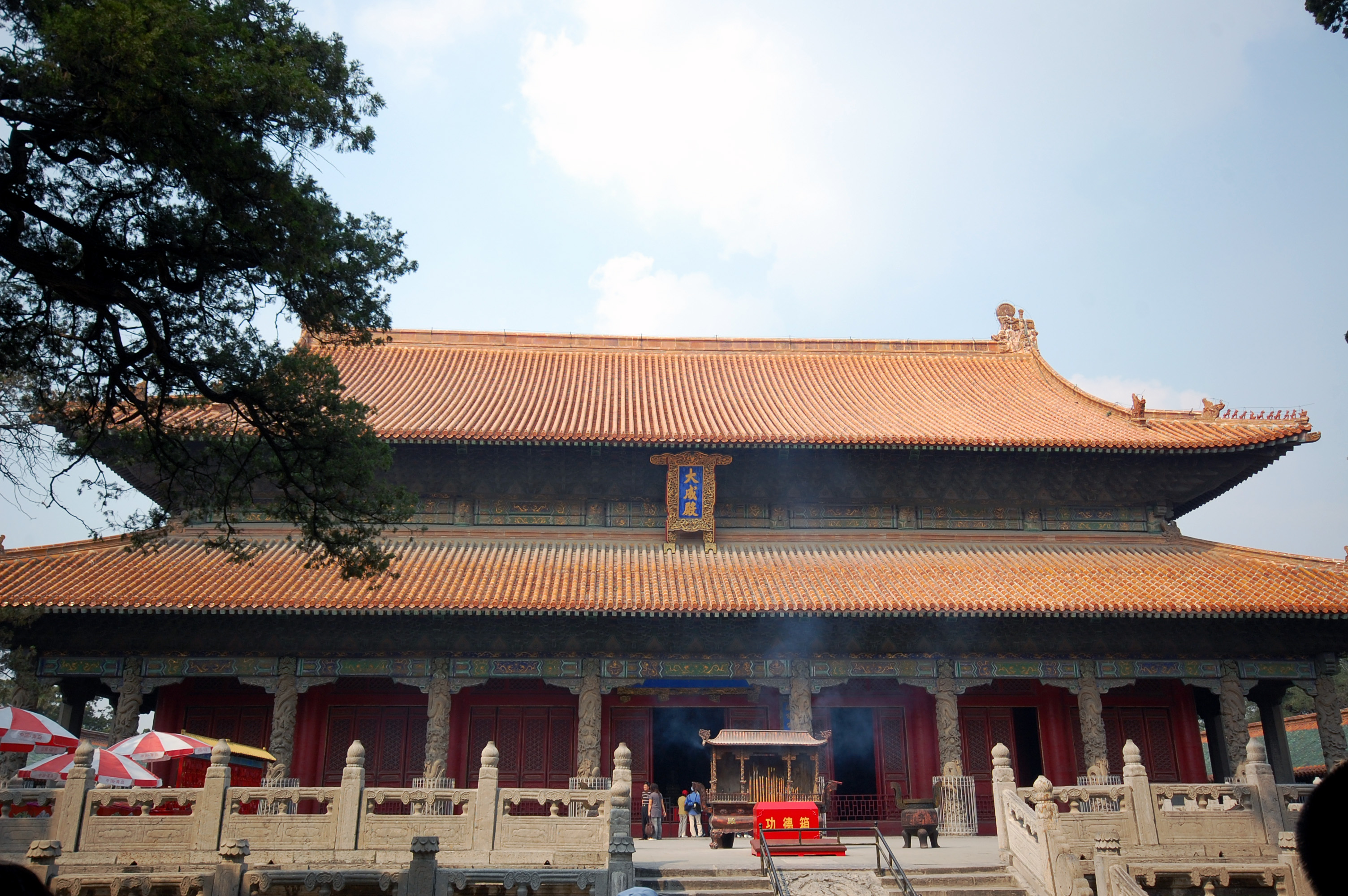
Hall of Great Perfection (Dacheng Hall) of the Confucius temple in Qufu

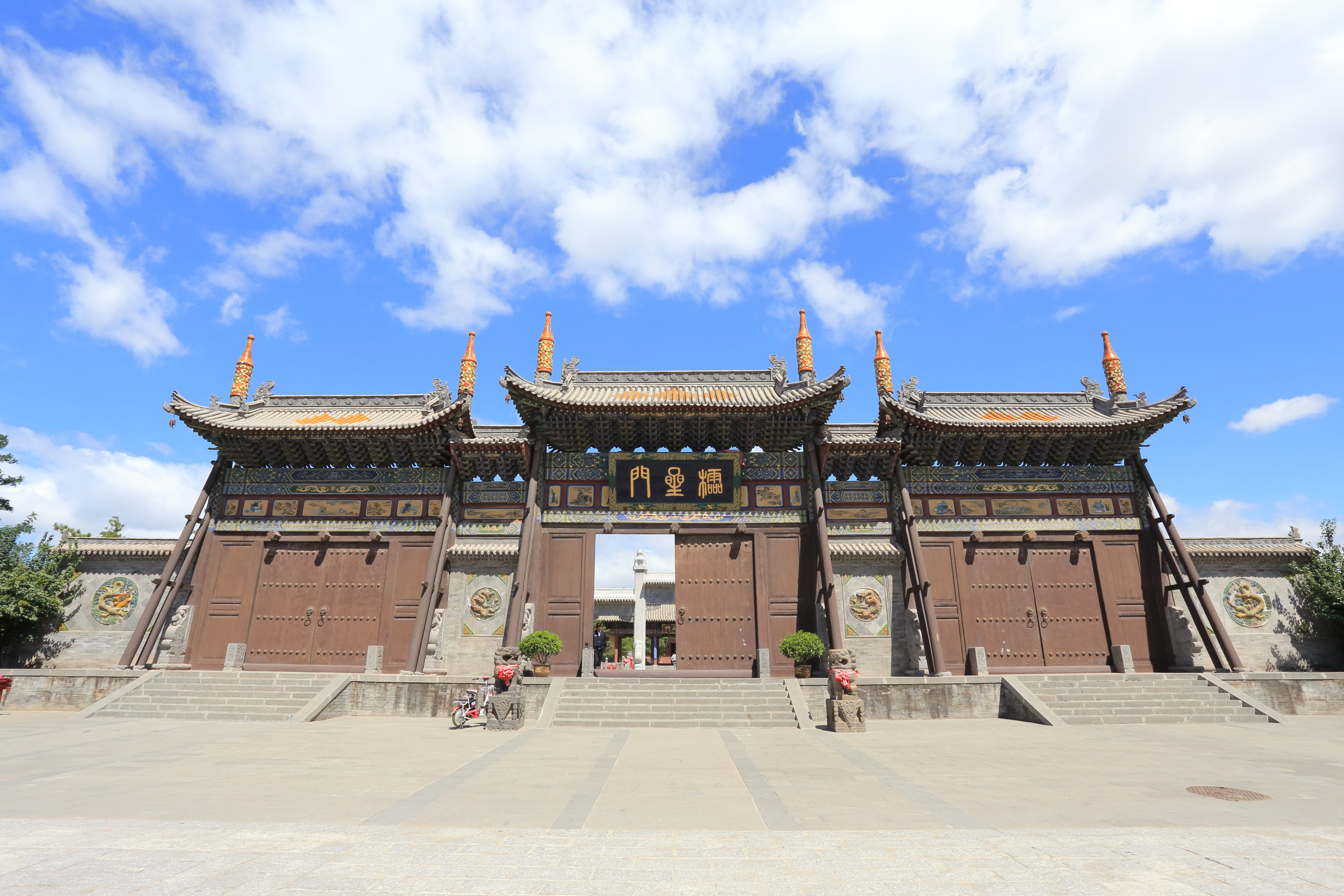
The gates of the Temple of Confucius in Datong, Shanxi.

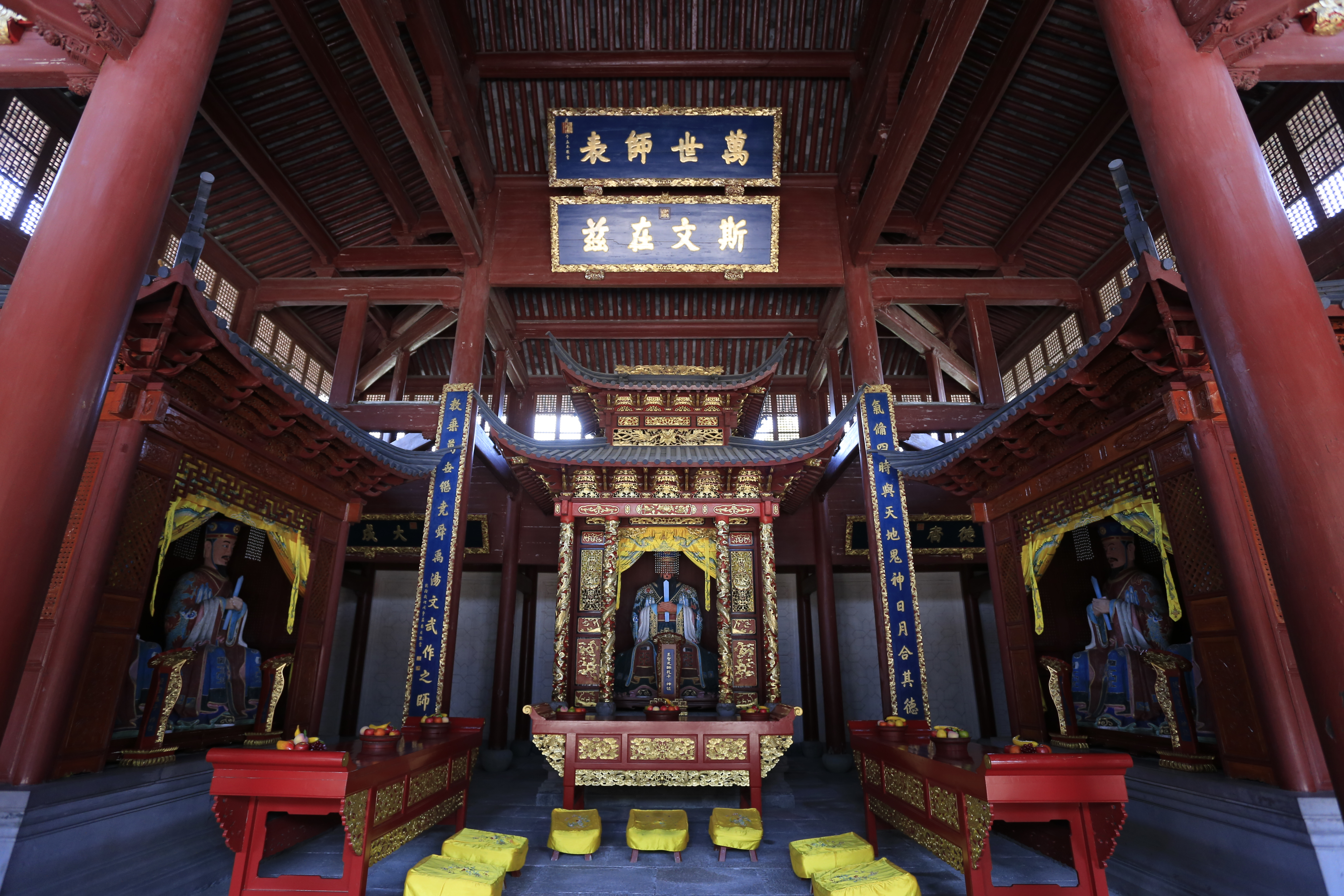
Main hall of the Temple of Confucius in Ningbo, Zhejiang.

The development of state temples devoted to the cult of Confucius was an outcome of his gradual canonisation. In 195 BC, Han Gao Zu, founder of the Han dynasty (r. 206–195 BC), offered a sacrifice to the spirit of Confucius at his tomb in Qufu. Sacrifices to the spirit of Confucius and that of Yan Hui, his most prominent disciple, began in the Imperial University (Biyong) as early as 241.

In 454, the Liu Song dynasty of southern China built a prominent state Confucian temple. In 489, the Northern Wei constructed a Confucian temple in the capital, the first outside of Qufu in the north. In 630, the Tang dynasty decreed that schools in all provinces and counties should have a Confucian temple, as a result of which temples spread throughout China. Well-known Confucian shrines include the Confucian Temple in Jianshui, the Confucian Temple in Xi'an (now the Forest of Steles), the Fuzi Miao in Nanjing, and the Confucian Temple in Beijing, first built in 1302. The Confucian Temple of old Tianjin is located on Dongmennei Dajie, a short distance west of Traditional Culture Street (Gu Wenhua Jie). Occupying 32 acres of land, the Confucian Temple is the largest extant traditional architectural complex in Tianjin.

The largest and oldest Temple of Confucius is found in Confucius' hometown, present-day Qufu in Shandong Province. It was established in 479 BC, one year after Confucius's death, at the order of the Duke Ai of the State of Lu, who commanded that the Confucian residence should be used to worship and offer sacrifice to Confucius. The temple was expanded repeatedly over a period of more than 2,000 years until it became the huge complex currently standing. There is another temple in Quzhou. In addition to Confucian temples associated with the state cult of Confucius, there were also ancestral temples belonging to the Kong lineage, buildings commemorating Confucius's deeds throughout China, and private temples within academies.

== Structure ==
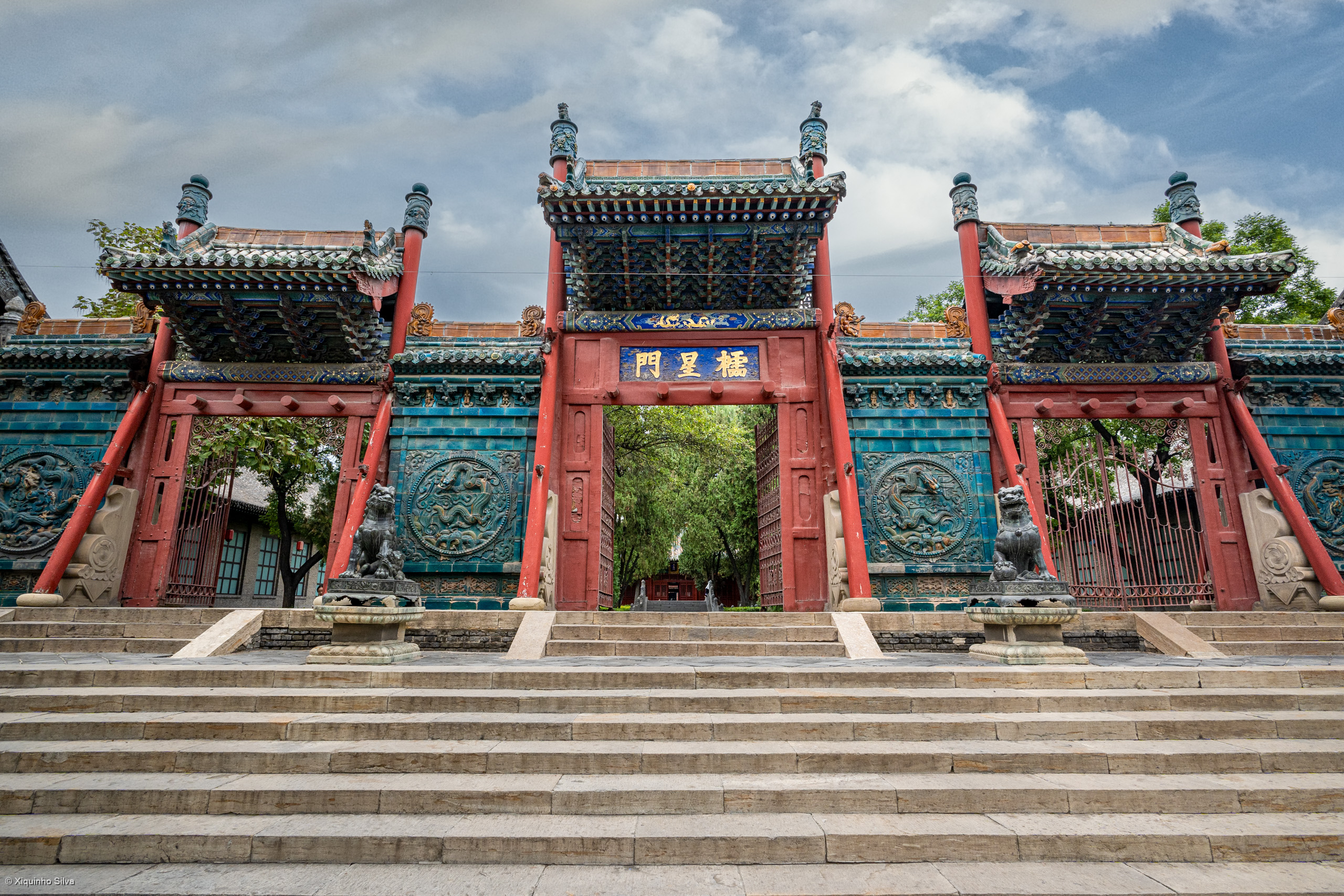
The Lingxing Gate of the Taiyuan Confucius Temple

Beginning in the Tang dynasty (618–907), Confucian temples were built in prefectural and county schools throughout the empire, either to the front of or on one side of the school. The front gate of the temple is called the Lingxing Gate (棂星门; 欞星門). Inside there are normally three courtyards, although sometimes there are only two. However, the complex in Qufu has nine courtyards containing scores of steles commemorating visits by an emperor or imperial grants of noble titles upon descendants of Confucius. The main building, situated in the inner courtyard with entry via the Dachengmen (大成门; 大成門), is called the Dachengdian (大成殿), variously translated as "Hall of Great Achievement", "Hall of Great Completion", or "Hall of Great Perfection". In imperial China, this hall housed the Spirit Tablets (神位) of Confucius and those of other important sages (圣; 聖) and worthies (贤; 賢). In front of the Dachengdian in Qufu is the Apricot Pavilion or Xingtan (杏坛; 杏壇). Another important building behind the main building is the Shrine of Adoring the Sage (崇圣祠; 崇聖祠; Chongshengci), which honoured the ancestors of Confucius and the fathers of the Four Correlates and Twelve Philosophers.

Unlike Taoist or Buddhist temples, Confucian temples do not normally have images. In the early years of the temple in Qufu, it appears that the spirits of Confucius and his disciples were represented with wall paintings and clay or wooden statues. Official temples also contained images of Confucius himself. However, there was opposition to this practice, which was seen as imitative of Buddhist temples. It was also argued that the point of the imperial temples was to honour Confucius's teachings, not the man himself.

The lack of unity in likenesses in statues of Confucius first led Emperor Taizu of the Ming dynasty to decree that all new Confucian temples should contain only spirit tablets and no images. In 1530, it was decided that all existing images of Confucius should be replaced with spirit tablets in imperial temples in the capital and other bureaucratic locations; nevertheless many modern Confucian temples do feature statues. Statues also remained in temples operated by Confucius's family descendants, such as that in Qufu. The use of spirit tablets as opposed to images seems to reflect Confucian ritual values that emphasize respect, moral cultivation, and remembrance over visual representation.

== Worship ==
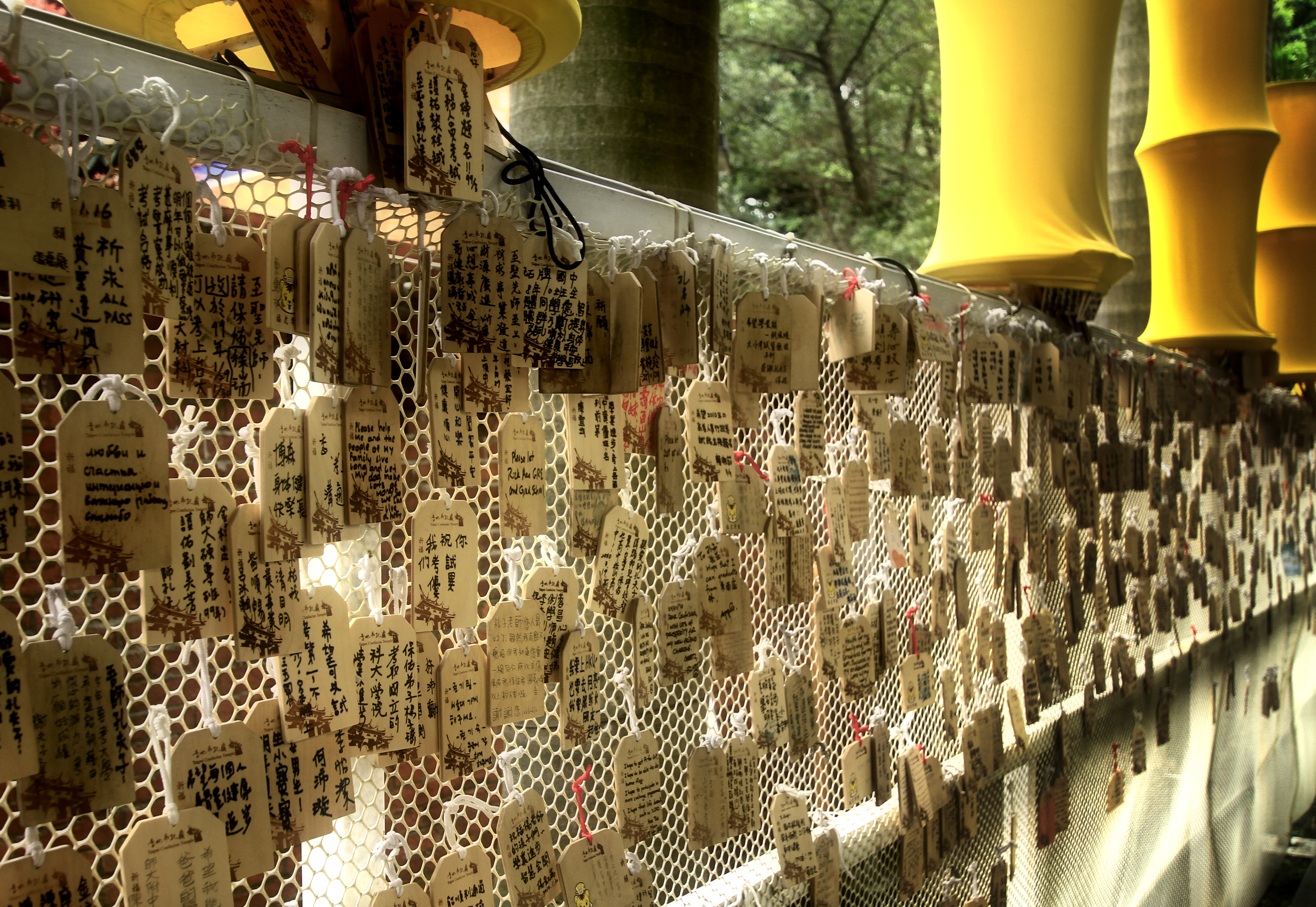
Prayer plaques in a temple of Confucius

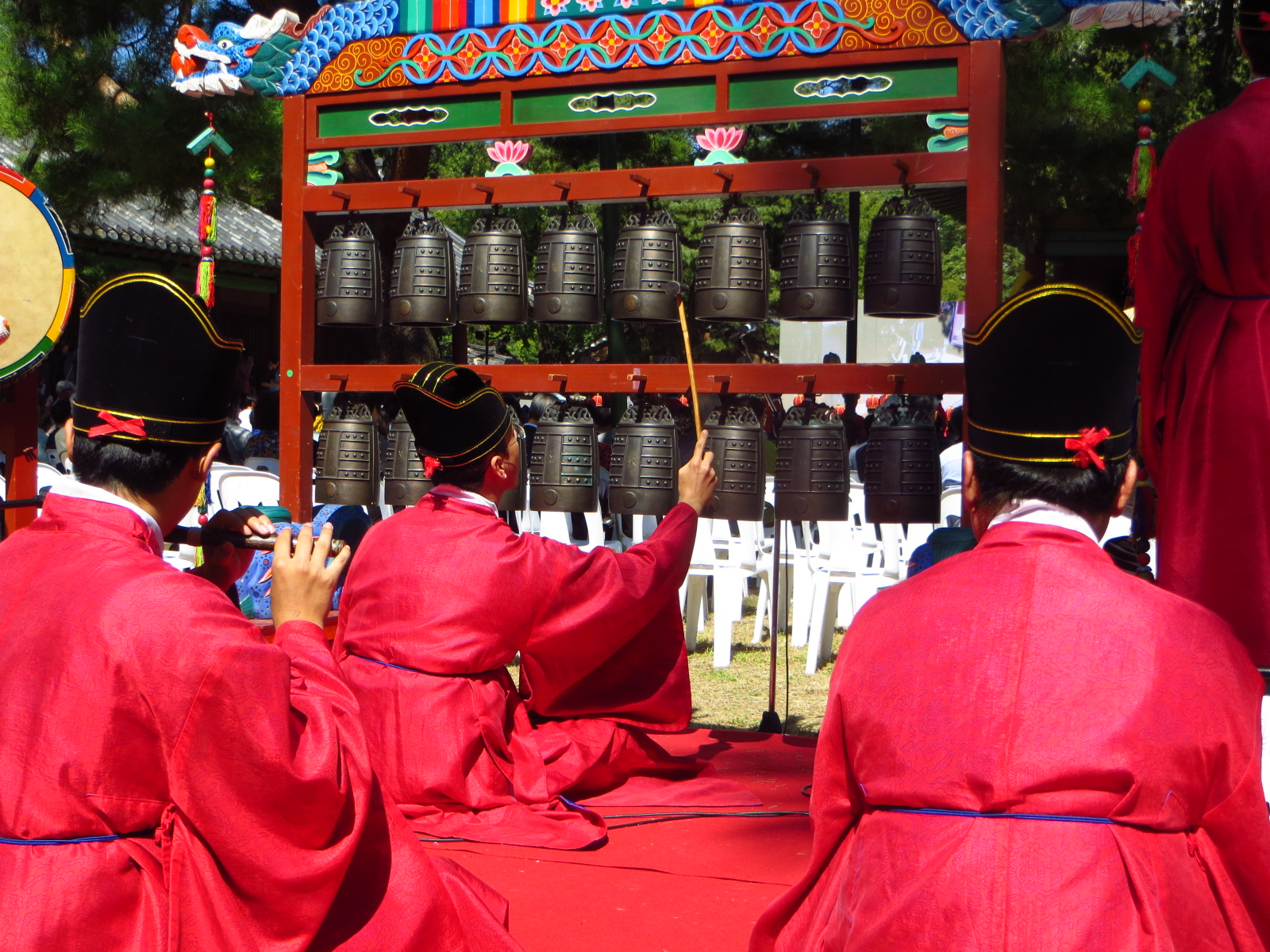
Aak musicians at a Confucian ceremony in Munmyo Shrine, Korea

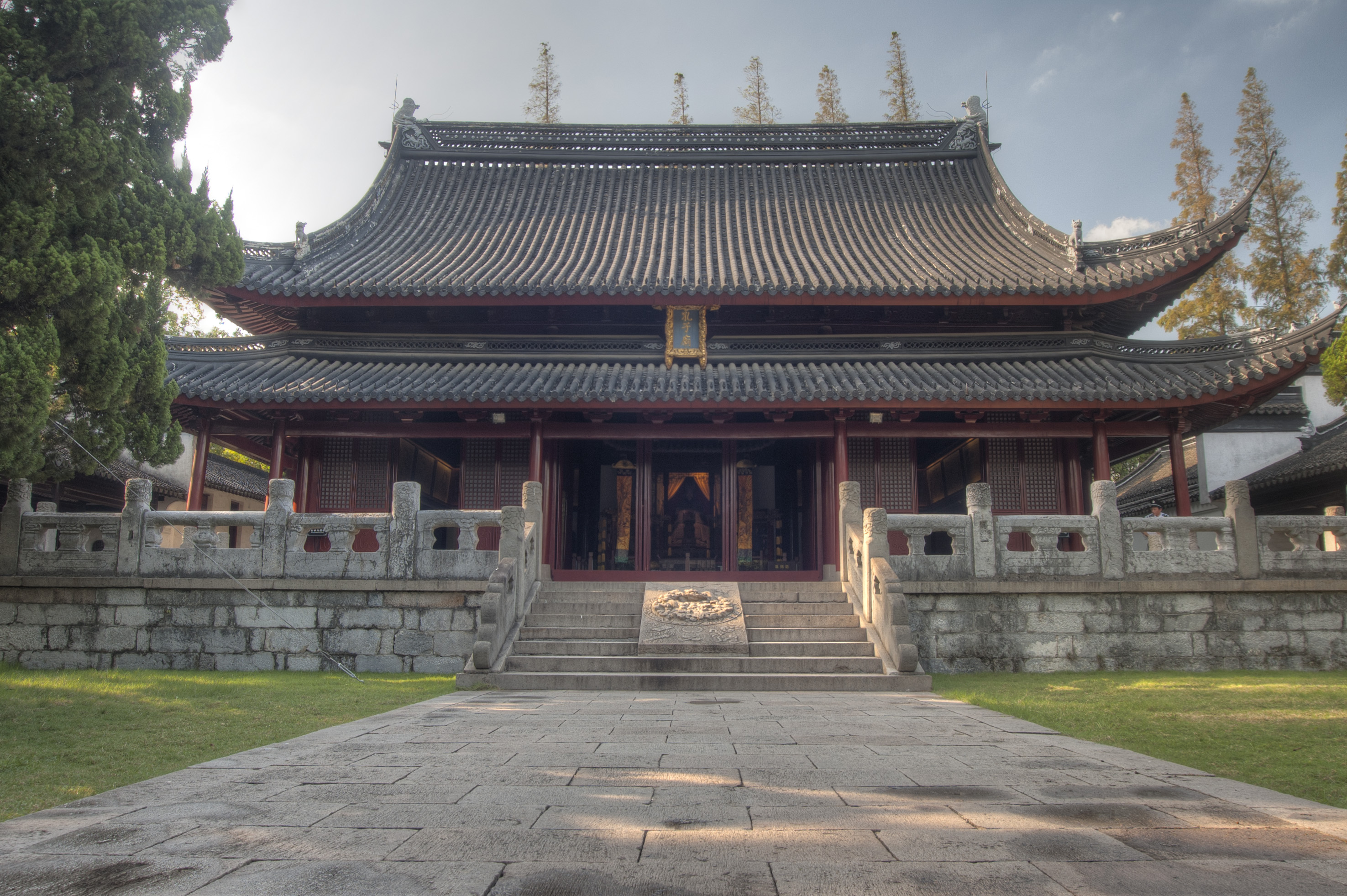
The Temple of Confucius in Jiading, now a suburb of Shanghai. The Jiading Temple of Confucius now operates a museum devoted to the imperial exam formerly administered at the temples.

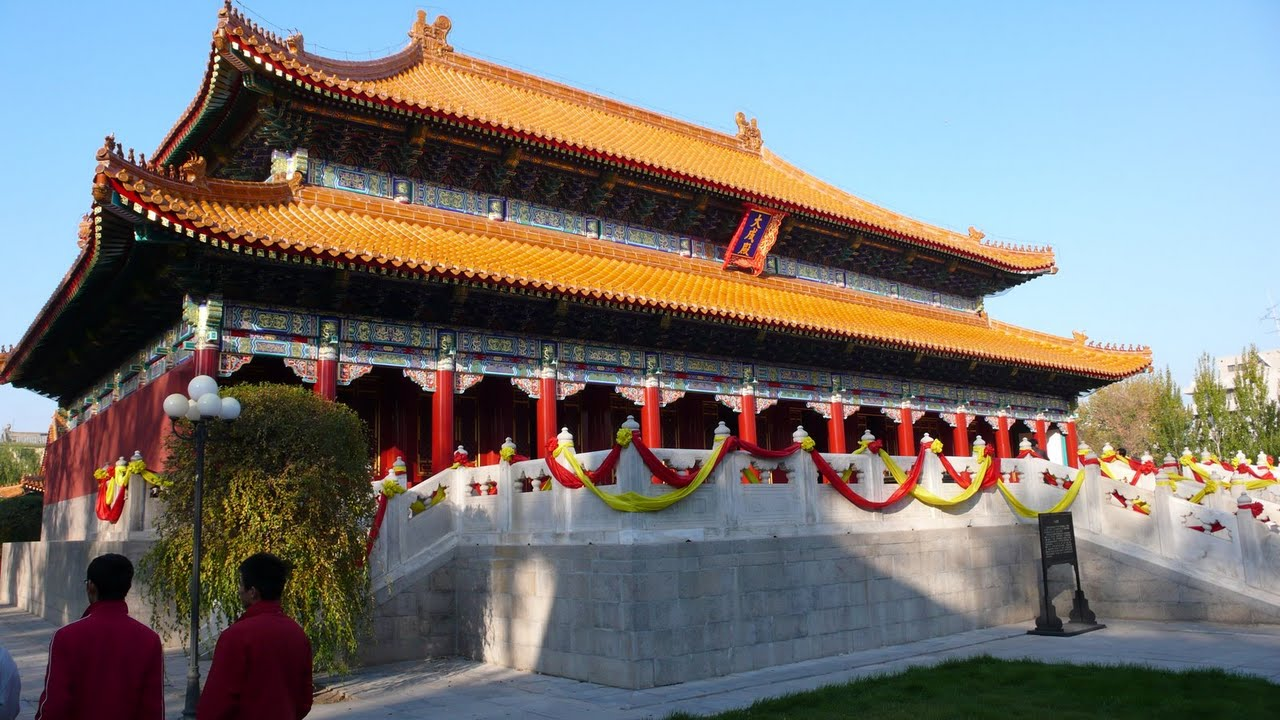
The Hall of Great Achievement of the Temple of Confucius in Harbin, Heilongjiang.

The worship of Confucius centred upon offering sacrifices to Confucius's spirit in the Confucian temple.

A dance known as the Eight-Row Dance (八佾舞), consisting of eight columns of eight dancers each, was also performed. Originally this was a Six-Row Dance, as performed for the lesser aristocracy, but in 1477 Confucius was allowed the imperial honour of the eight-row dance since he posthumously received the title of king. Musicians who accompanied this dance played a form of music termed yayue.

In addition to worshipping Confucius, Confucian temples also honour the "Four Correlates", the "Twelve Philosophers", and other disciples and Confucian scholars through history. The composition and number of figures worshipped changed and grew through time. Since temples were a statement of Confucian orthodoxy, the issue of which Confucians to enshrine was a controversial one.

By the Republican period (20th century), there were a total of 162 figures worshipped. The Four Correlates are Yan Hui, Zeng Shen, Kong Ji (Zisi), and Mencius. The Twelve Philosophers are Min Sun (Ziqian), Ran Geng (Boniu), Ran Yong (Zhonggong), Zai Yu (Ziwo), Duanmu Ci (Zigong), Ran You, Zi-Lu, Zi-You, Zi-Xia, Zi-Zhang, You Ruo, and Zhu Xi. A list of disciples of Confucius and their place in the Confucian temple can be found at Disciples of Confucius.

== Outside mainland China ==
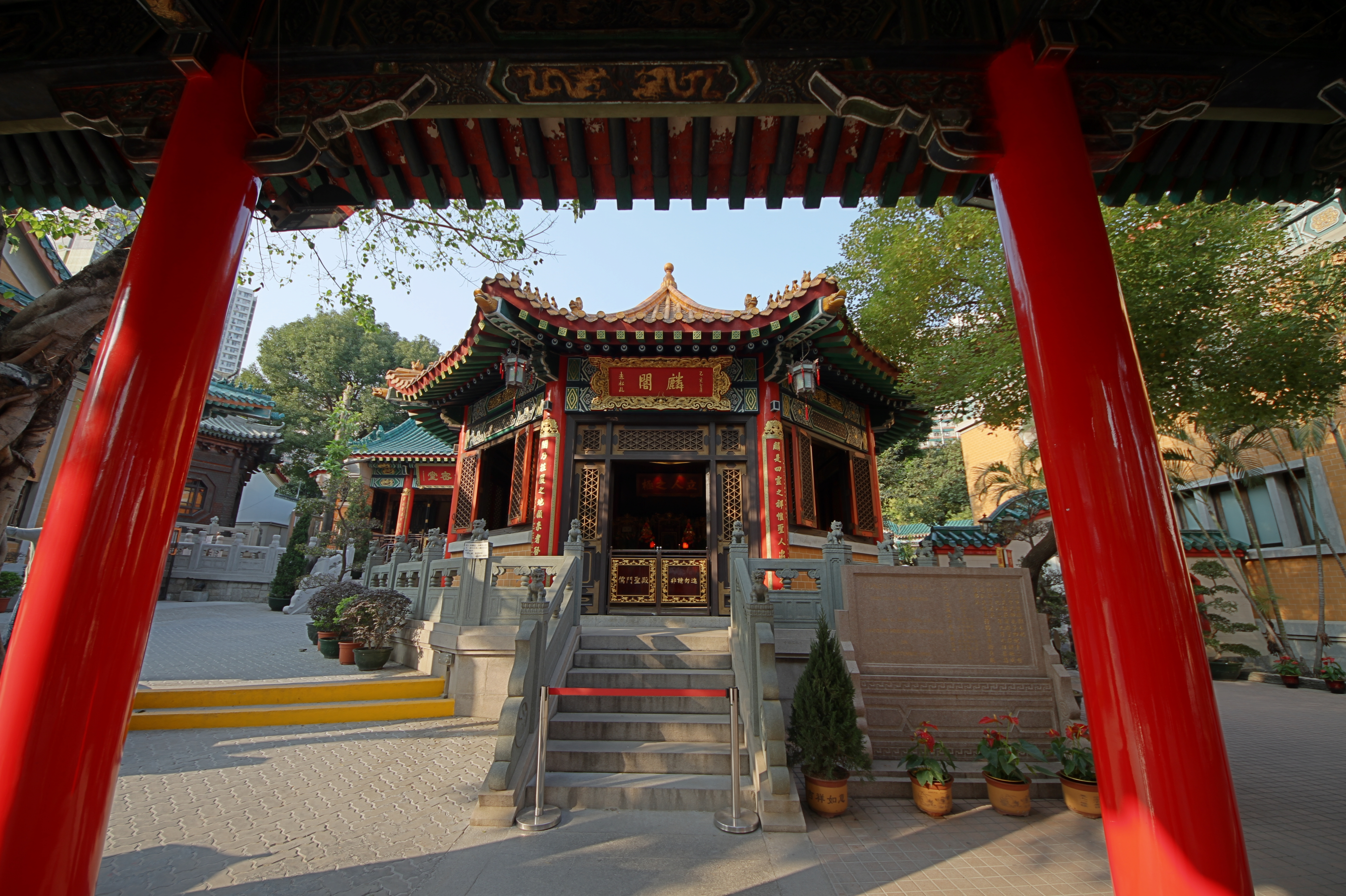
Confucian Hall next to Wong Tai Sin Temple in Hong Kong

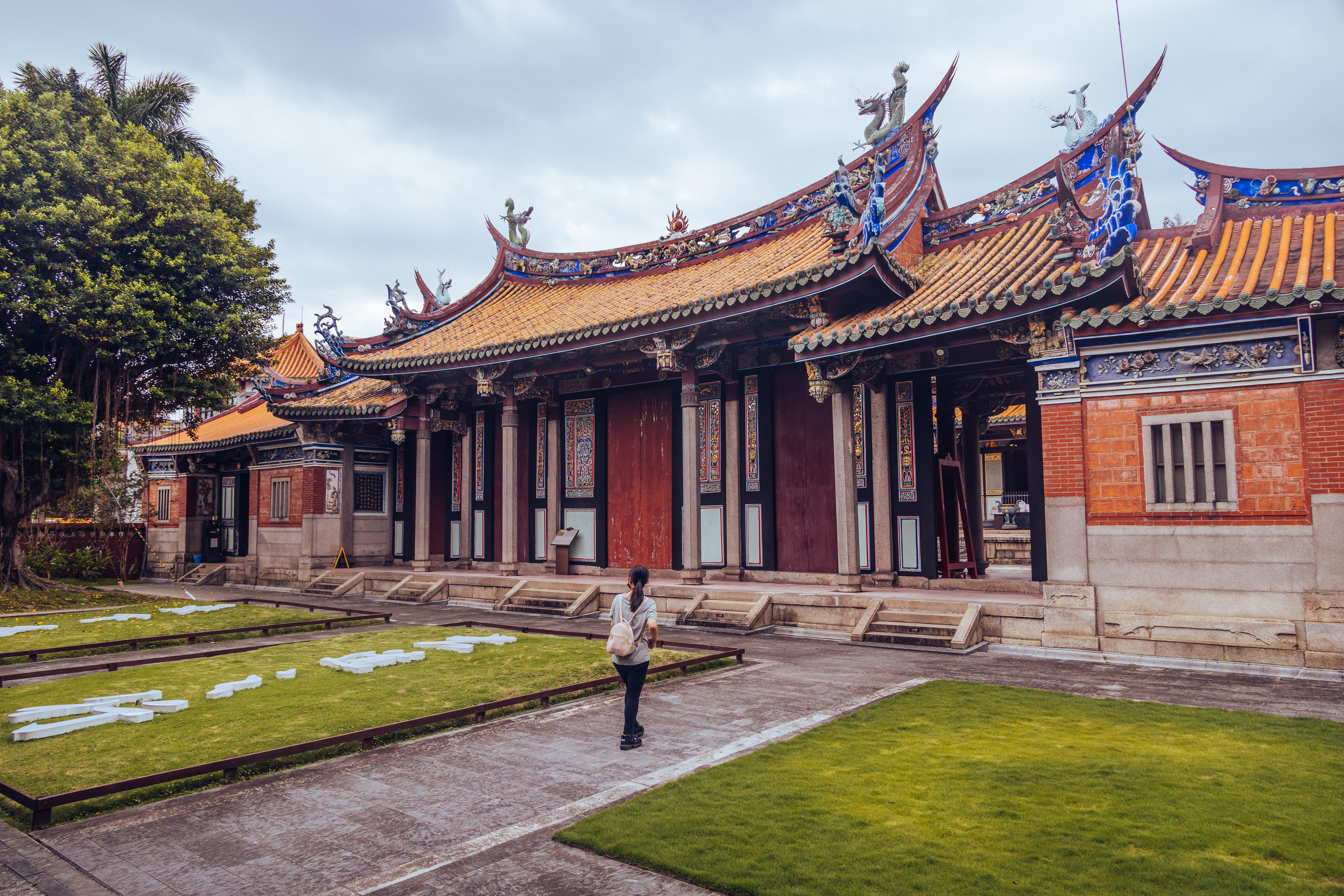
Taipei Confucius Temple

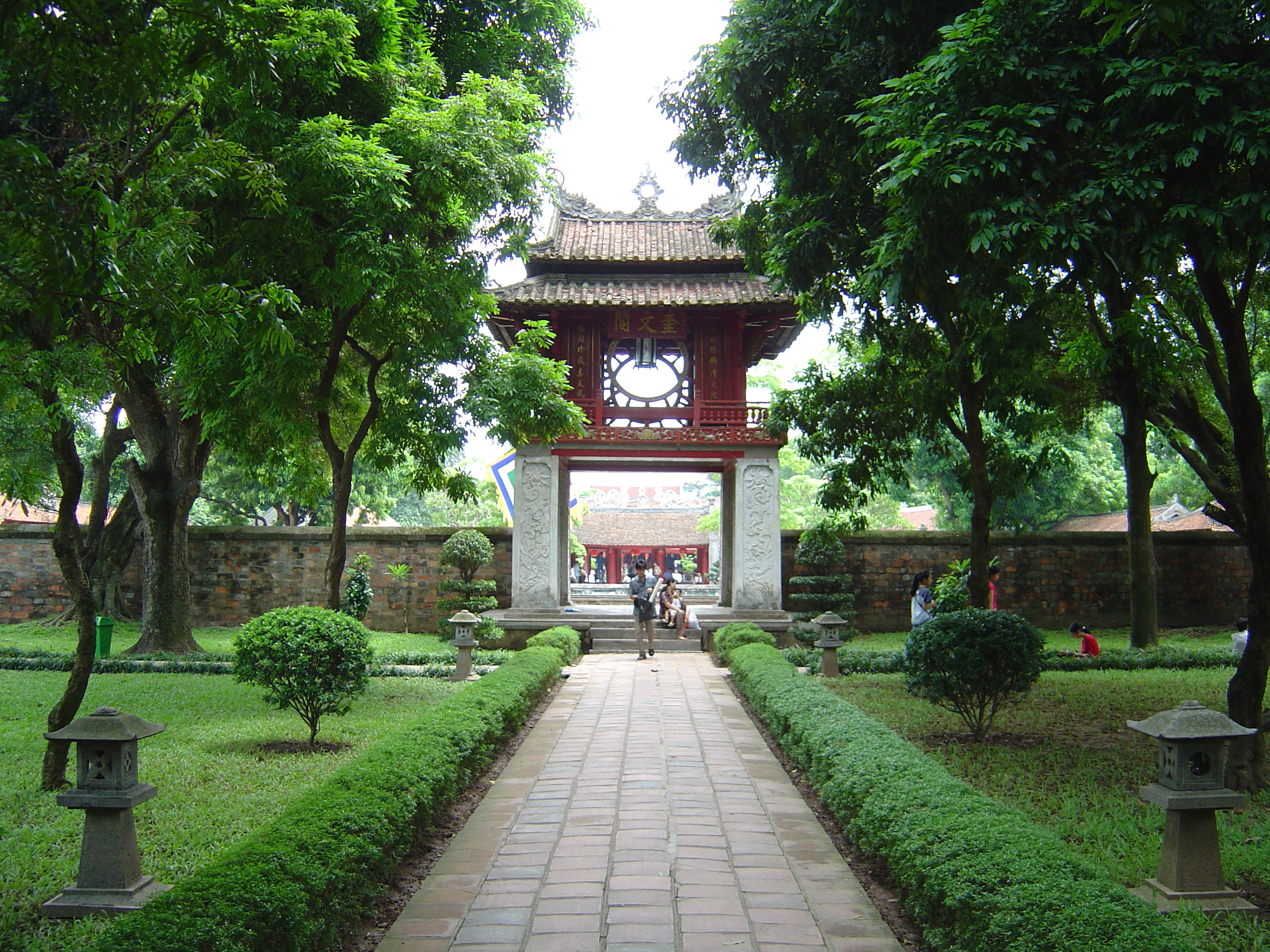
A Văn Miếu, or Temple of Literature, in Hanoi, Vietnam

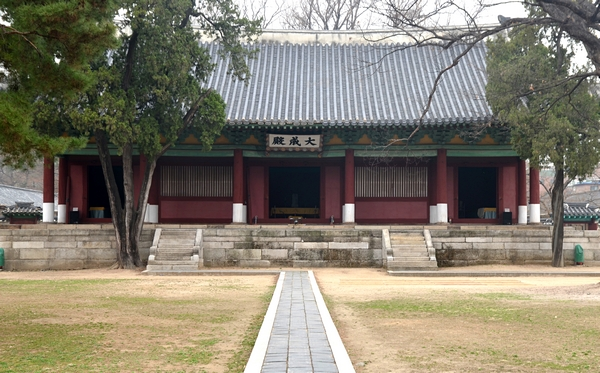
Munmyo in Seoul, South Korea

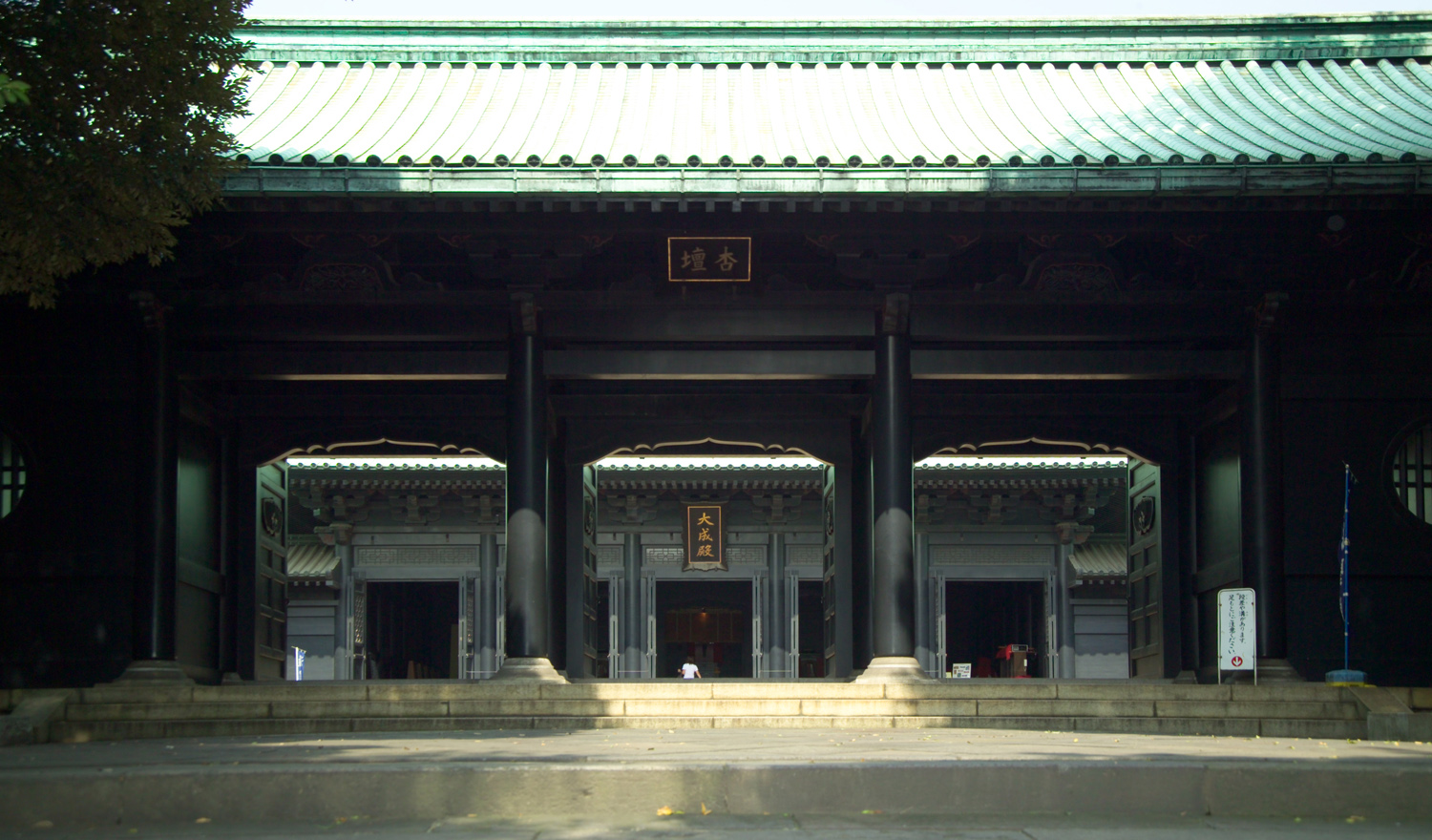
Entrance gate of reconstructed Yushima Seidō, Tokyo, Japan

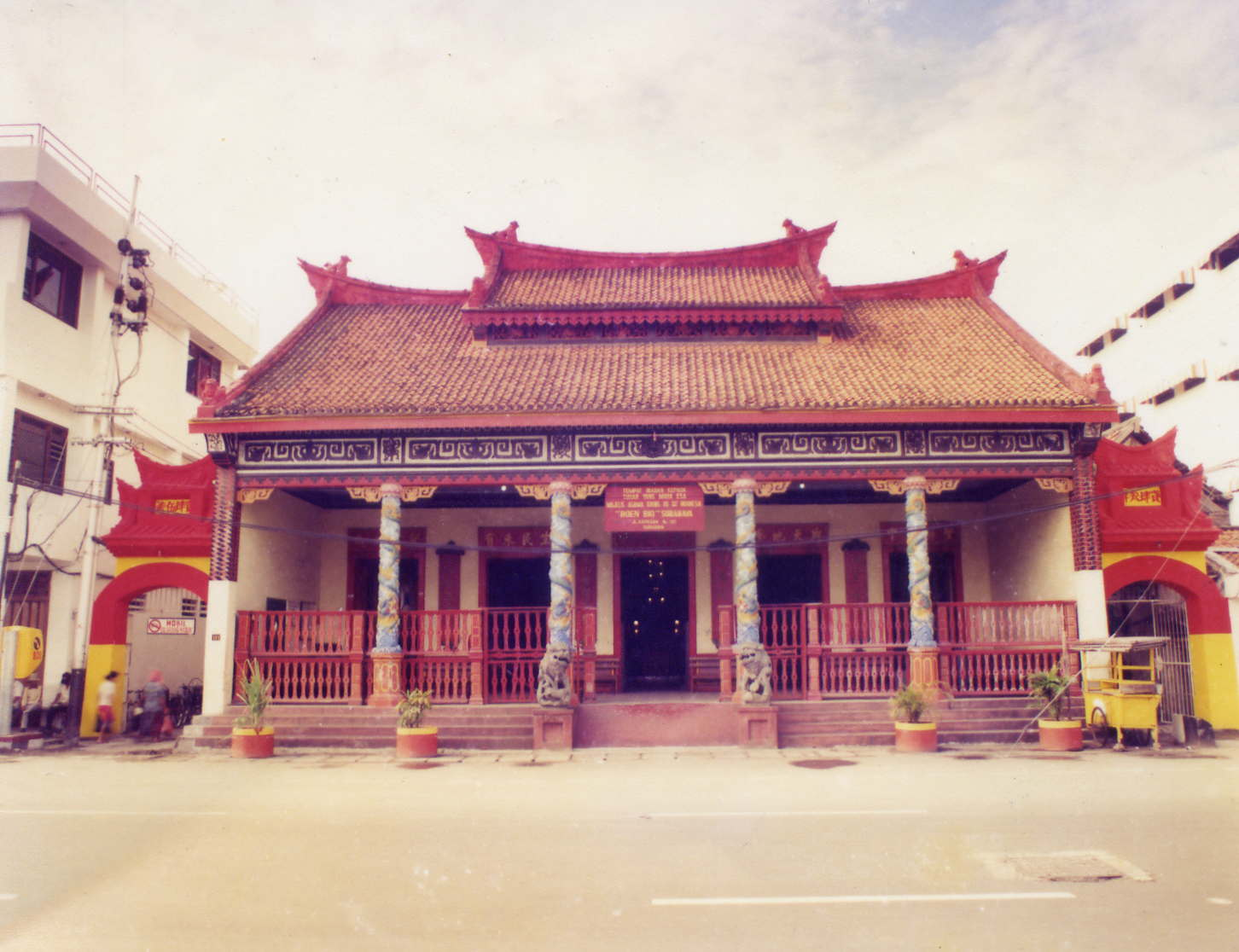
A Confucian church in Surabaya, Indonesia

With the spread of Confucian learning throughout East Asia, Confucian temples were also built in Vietnam, Korea, and Japan. Starting in the 18th century, some were even built in Europe and the Americas. At their height, there are estimated to have been over 3,000 Confucian temples in existence.

=== Hong Kong ===
The bill allowing for the building of the very first Confucian temple in Hong Kong, proposed by the Confucian Academy, passed in September 2013. The location of the temple was decided to be near the famous Taoist temple, Wong Tai Sin Temple, in Wong Tai Sin District.

=== Taiwan ===
The first Confucian temple in Taiwan to be constructed was the Taiwan Confucian Temple, which was built during the period of the Tungning Kingdom in 1665 in Tainan. A more recent temple, the Taipei Confucius Temple, was built on Wenwu Street in Taipei in 1879, torn down by Japanese in 1907 to make place for the Taipei First Girls' High School, and re-erected on Dalong Street from 1925 to 1939. The new temple was designed by Wang Yi-Shun, who also oversaw its construction. The design is an example of typical Fujian temple style. Every year on September 28, the birthday of Confucius, city authorities hold the Shidian (釋奠) Ceremony here. In addition, there is a Confucian temple located in Zuoying District of Kaohsiung that was completed in 1974 in the Northern Song architectural style. Other Confucian temples are found in Chiayi City, Taipei, Taichung and Changhua County.

=== Vietnam ===
A Confucian temple in Vietnam is called Văn Miếu. The earliest recorded Văn Miếu in Vietnam is the Văn Miếu, Hanoi, established in 1070 during the Lý dynasty. After 1397, with the construction of schools throughout Vietnam under the Tran, Confucian temples began to spread throughout the country. Another renowned Vietnamese Confucian temple is the Văn Miếu, Hưng Yên, located in Hưng Yên City. Well-known Confucian temples were built in Huế, Tam Kỳ, Hội An, Hưng Yên, Hải Dương, Biên Hòa, Vĩnh Long and Bắc Ninh.

=== Korea ===
Outside China, the largest number of Confucian temples is found in Korea. Temples as part of schools were first built during the Goryeo period (918–1392). From the time of Yi Seonggye (r. 1392–1398), Confucianism underpinned the new dynasty and its government. Thus government Confucian schools (Hyanggyo 항교) were built throughout Joseon to educate future government officials in Confucianism. These consisted of a building for teaching, together with a building (대성전; Daesongjeon) which housed the memorial tablets of Confucius. Although Chinese models were followed, variations in layout and construction were common, such as the building of schools in front of temples. Korea also added its own scholars (the eighteen scholars of the East) to the Confucian pantheon (the five sages).

Historically, Korea had a total of 362 temples devoted to Confucianism. After World War II and the division of the country, those in the North were converted to use as a center of traditional culture (see Gukjagam). However, some of the 232 temples in the South continued their activities (see Munmyo). In addition to temples devoted to Confucianism the Republic of Korea also has twelve Confucian family temples, two temples in private schools, and three libraries.

=== Japan ===
Confucian temples (孔子廟, kōshi-byō) were also widely built in Japan, often in conjunction with Confucian schools. The most famous is the Yushima Seidō, built in 1630 during the Edo period as a private school connected with the Neo-Confucianist scholar Hayashi Razan. Originally built in Shinobi-ga-oka in Ueno, it was moved at the end of the 18th century near present-day Ochanomizu by the Tokugawa Shogunate, and a major state-sponsored school, Shoheikō, was opened on its grounds.

Other well-known Confucian temples are found in Nagasaki, Bizen, Okayama prefecture; Taku, Saga prefecture; and Naha, Okinawa prefecture.

=== Indonesia ===
Confucian temples are also found in Indonesia, where they are often known as "Churches of Confucius" as Confucianism is a recognised religion in that country. In Chinese, these establishments are known as litang (礼堂) or "halls of worship". The largest and oldest is the Boen Bio in Surabaya, originally built in the city's Chinatown in 1883 and moved to a new site in 1907. There are reportedly more than 100 Confucianist halls of worship throughout Indonesia.

=== Malaysia ===
The first Confucian temple in Malaysia was built within a primary school known as Chung Hwa Confucian School (which has since split into SJK(C) Chung Hwa Confucian A, B and SMJK Chung Hwa Confucian) in Penang, in the early 20th century. The building of the school was initiated by the Qing dynasty ambassador to the British Straits Settlement at that time. In those days parents in Penang brought their children to this temple for prayer before they began their schooling. The children prayed for excellence in their studies.

There are also two Confucian schools in Kuala Lumpur, namely SMJK Confucian and Confucian Private School, and a Confucian school in Malacca where ceremonies in honour of Confucius are held annually.

== List of temples ==
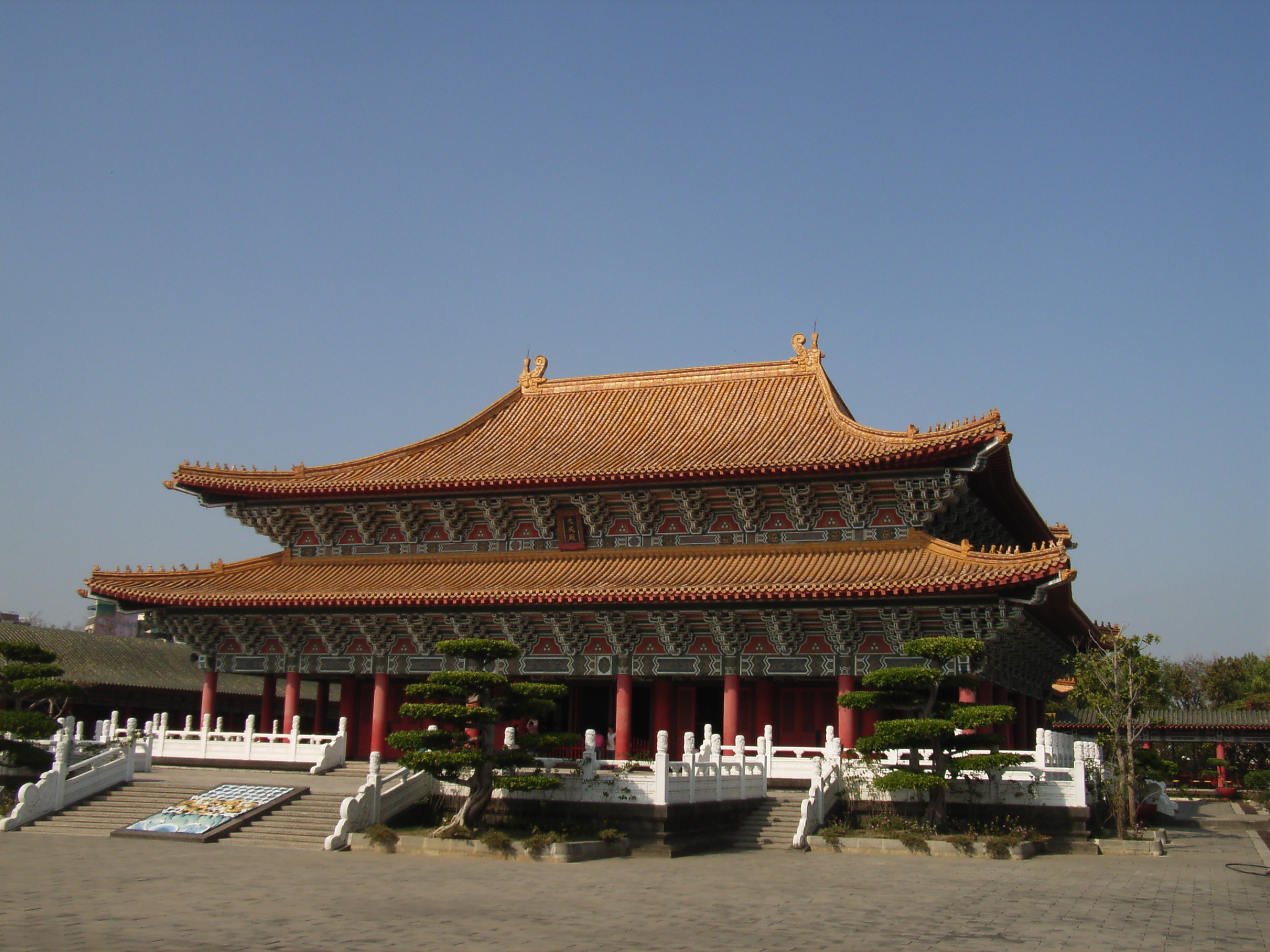
The Temple of Confucius in Kaohsiung, Taiwan.

The Daizhou Confucian Temple in Dai County, Shanxi.

- Temple of Confucius in Qufu, China (Confucius's home town)
- Temple of Confucius in Beijing, China
- Temple of Confucius in Daixian, Shanxi, China
- Temple of Confucius in Jianshui, Yunnan, China (建水文庙)
- Temple of the Master in Nanjing, China
- Temple of Confucius in Shanghai, China
- Temple of Confucius in Suzhou, China
- Temple of Confucius in Wuwei, China
- Temple of Confucius in Taipei, Taiwan
- Temple of Confucius in Ürümqi, Xinjiang, China
- Temple of Confucius in Taoyuan, Taiwan
- Temple of Confucius in Taichung, Taiwan
- Temple of Confucius in Kaohsiung, Taiwan
- Temple of Confucius in Tainan, Taiwan ("Taiwan Confucian Temple")
- Temple of Confucius in Changhua, Taiwan
- Temple of Confucius in Chiayi, Taiwan
- Temple of Confucius in Nagasaki, Japan
- Shiseibyō, the Temple of Confucius in Naha, Okinawa, Japan
- Seibyō, the Temple of Confucius in Taku, Japan
- Yushima Seidō, the Temple of Confucius in Tokyo, Japan
- Munmyo, the Temple of Confucius in Seoul, South Korea
- Văn Miếu in Hanoi, Vietnam
- Văn Miếu in Hưng Yên, Vietnam
- Văn Miếu in Hải Dương, Vietnam
- Văn Miếu in Bắc Ninh, Vietnam
- Văn Miếu in Nghệ An, Vietnam
- Văn Miếu in Khánh Hòa, Vietnam
- Văn Miếu in Đồng Nai, Vietnam
- Văn Miếu in Vĩnh Long, Vietnam
- Boen Bio in Surabaya, Indonesia

== See also ==
- Mansion and Cemetery of Confucius
- Supreme Council for the Confucian Religion in Indonesia
