= Glossary of Shangshu exegesis =

This is a glossary of Shangshu (Shujing) exegesis (for further details on the early Chinese text, see the main article “Book of Documents”).

The glossary of the Book of Documents exegesis pertains to the transmission and commentary history of the Shangshu (simplified Chinese: 尚书; traditional Chinese: 尚書; pinyin: Shàngshū; Wade–Giles: Shang-shu), also called Shujing (simplified Chinese: 书经; traditional Chinese: 書經; pinyin: Shūjīng; Wade–Giles: Shu-ching), often abbreviated with Shu (simplified Chinese: 书; traditional Chinese: 書; pinyin: Shū) as an alternative short title, a historical Chinese text which is known in English under the titles Book of Documents or Book of History or the Classic of History, one of the Five Classics of Confucianism, a compilation of speeches, edicts, and historical records attributed to ancient sage-kings and ministers, traditionally said to have been edited by Confucius. It preserves some of the earliest historiographical and political writings in China. There are two main Shangshu versions: the → Old Script Shangshu (58 chapters) and → Modern Script Shangshu (28 chapters), see also the → Forged Old Script Shangshu. Since the Han dynasty, numerous scholars have produced countless commentaries and annotations on the Shangshu (Shujing).

== Glossary ==
Note: The following glossary of Shangshu (Shujing) exegesis (the Chinese word for exegesis is xunguxue: simplified Chinese: 训诂学; traditional Chinese: 訓詁學; pinyin: xùngǔxué; Wade–Giles: hsün-ku-hsüeh) is not a glossary of the Shangshu’s contents (that is, not of the individual chapters or topics such as "Canon of Yao" or "Great Plan" or last not least “Metal-Bound Coffer”), but rather of its transmission, editions, and commentary tradition — in other words, of the philological and exegetical tradition surrounding the text. Some book titles are roughly translated. The information provided does not claim to be complete or up-to-date.

=== C ===
Cai Shen
Cai Shen 蔡沈 Cài Shěn (fl. 13th c.), Southern Song scholar, author of the Shu jizhuan (书集传), an influential commentary synthesizing earlier traditions on the Shangshu.

Chen Mengjia
Chen Mengjia 陳夢家 Chén Mèngjiā (1911–1966), Chinese scholar, archaeologist, and philologist. Author of Shangshu tonglun (尚書通論), a seminal modern study of the Shangshu, notable for its combination of textual analysis and early Chinese script research.

Chen Qiaocong
Chen Qiaocong 陈乔枞/陳喬樅 Chén Qiáocōng (1809–1869), Qing-dynasty scholar and textual critic. Author of Jinwen Shangshu jingshuo kao (今文尚书经说考), in which he examined the remnants and commentarial traces of the Jinwen Shangshu, contributing to Qing scholarship on the philological and exegetical study of the Shangshu.

Chen Yan
Chen Yan 陈衍 Chén Yǎn (1856–1937), late Qing and early Republican scholar, poet, and historian. Author of Shangshu juyao (尚书举要).

=== D ===
Dai Junren
Dai Junren 戴君仁 Dài Jūnrén (1901–1978), Chinese scholar and historian specializing in the textual criticism of ancient Chinese classics. He compiled Yan Mao Guwen Shangshu gong’an (閻毛古文尚書公案), a seminal study of the Qing-dynasty debate over the authenticity of the Guwen Shangshu.

Duan Yucai
Duan Yucai 段玉裁 Duàn Yùcái (1735–1815), Qing-dynasty linguist and philologist, known for Shuowen jiezi zhu 说文解字注 and Guwen Shangshu zhuanyi.

=== G ===
Gu Jiegang
Gu Jiegang 顧頡剛 Gù Jiégāng (1893–1980), modern Chinese historian and philologist, pioneer of doubting antiquity (yiguxue 疑古学 yígǔxué). He conducted critical studies of early Chinese historical texts, including the Shangshu, questioning traditional attributions and exploring textual formation. His work laid the foundation for modern critical approaches to classical Chinese historiography and philology. He edited the Gushi bian (古史辨; 'Debates on Ancient History').

Guwen Shangshu
Guwen Shangshu 古文尚书 Gǔwén Shàngshū (“Old Script Shangshu”), a version of the Shangshu said to have been rediscovered in the wall of Confucius’ house during the Han dynasty. The text transmitted by Mei Ze in the Eastern Jin is now considered a forgery.

Guwen Shangshu Ma-Zheng zhu
Guwen Shangshu Ma-Zheng zhu 古文尚书马郑注 Gǔwén Shàngshū Mǎ-Zhèng zhù (Ma and Zheng Commentary on the Old Script Shangshu), 10 juan, by Sun Xingyan.

Guwen Shangshu shiyi
Guwen Shangshu shiyi 古文尚书拾遗 Gǔwén Shàngshū shíyí (“Supplementary Studies on the Old Script Shangshu”), work by Zhang Binglin adding philological notes and corrections to earlier research on the Old Script text.

Guwen Shangshu shuzheng
Guwen Shangshu shuzheng 古文尚书疏证 Gǔwén Shàngshū shūzhèng (“Critical Evidence on the Old Script Shangshu”), landmark Qing work by Yan Ruoqu exposing many Old Script chapters as later fabrications.

Guwen Shangshu yuanci
Guwen Shangshu yuanci 古文尚書冤詞 Gǔwén Shàngshū yuáncí (“In Defence of the Old Text Documents”), written by Mao Qiling 毛奇齡 (1623–1716). In this work, Mao Qiling defended the authenticity of the Guwen Shangshu against the textual criticism of Yan Ruoqu. The text is a key document in the Qing-dynasty scholarly debate over the authenticity of the Old Script Shangshu and forms part of the landmark case (公案 gong’an) in Shangshu textual criticism.

Guwen Shangshu zhuanyi
Guwen Shangshu zhuanyi 古文尚书撰异 Gǔwén Shàngshū zhuànyì (“Collected Variants of the Old Script Shangshu”), Qing-dynasty study by Duan Yucai comparing textual divergences among Shangshu versions.

=== H ===
Huang Qing jingjie
Huang Qing jingjie 皇清经解 Huáng Qīng jīngjiě (“Exegeses of the Classics under the August Qing”), imperial Qing anthology of commentaries on the Confucian classics, containing Guwen Shangshu zhuanyi 古文尚书撰异 of (Qing) Duan Yucai 段玉裁.

Huang Qing jingjie xubian
Huang Qing jingjie xubian 皇清经解续编 Huáng Qīng jīngjiě xùbiān (“Sequel to the Qing Exegeses of the Classics”), continuation of Huang Qing jingjie, containing later Qing commentaries such as Yan Ruoqu’s Guwen Shangshu shuzheng.

Hui Dong
Hui Dong 惠栋 Huì Dòng (1697–1758), Qing-dynasty scholar and philologist specializing in textual criticism and classical studies. Author of Shangshu guyi (尚书古义).

=== I ===
Ikeda Suetoshi
Ikeda Suetoshi 池田末利 (1910–2000), Japanese sinologist and scholar of early Chinese classics. Author of Shangshu (尚書), an influential modern commentary and translation that integrates Japanese philological research with traditional Chinese Shangshu exegesis.

=== J ===
Jiao Xun
Jiao Xun 焦循 Jiāo Xún (1741–1805), Qing-dynasty scholar. Author of Yugong Zhengzhushi (禹贡郑注释, Zheng Commentary and Annotations on the Tribute of Yu) and Shangshu Busu (尚书补疏, Supplementary Annotations on the Shangshu), important works in the Qing textual commentary tradition on the Shangshu.

Jiang Sheng
Jiang Sheng 江声 Jiāng Shēng (1721–1799), Qing-dynasty scholar. Author of Shangshu jizhu yinshu (尚书集注音疏, Collected Commentary with Phonetic Notes on the Shangshu), providing textual and phonetic annotations for study of the Shangshu.

Jinteng
Jinteng 金縢 (“Metal-Bound Coffer”), see Qinghua jian Jinteng jishi

Jinwen Shangshu
Jinwen Shangshu 今文尚书 (Jīnwén Shàngshū, “Modern Script Shangshu”), the version of the Shangshu transmitted in the Han dynasty with 28 extant chapters, written in contemporary clerical script. It forms the basis of the standard text included in the Shisanjing zhushu.

Jinwen Shangshu ershiba pian jie
Jinwen Shangshu ershiba pian jie 尚书今文二十八篇解 Jīnwén Shàngshū èrshíbā piān jiě (Exegesis of the Twenty-eight Chapters of the Modern Script Shangshu), by Yang Zhongtai 杨钟泰, providing commentary on the Jinwen Shangshu version.

Jinwen Shangshu jingshuo kao
Jinwen Shangshu jingshuo kao 今文尚书经说考 Jīnwén Shàngshū jīngshuō kǎo (Examination of the Lost Sayings of the Modern Script Shangshu), a Qing-dynasty study by Chen Qiaocong 陳喬樅. The work investigates fragments and lost commentarial traditions of the Jinwen Shangshu, analyzing the transmission and interpretation of the Modern Script version of the Shangshu.

=== K ===
Kaicheng shijing
Kaicheng shijing 开成石经/開成石經 Kāichéng shíjīng ("Stone Classics of the Kaicheng Era", with text of the Shangshu)

Kong Anguo
Kong Anguo 孔安国 Kǒng Ānguó (fl. 1st century BCE), Western Han scholar and descendant of Confucius. Known for his commentaries on the Confucian classics, including the Shangshu. His work contributed to the transmission and interpretation of both the “Modern Script” and “Old Script” versions of the Shangshu and influenced later Qing and modern studies of the text.

Kong Anguo Shangshu zhuan
Kong Anguo Shangshu zhuan 孔安国尚书传 Kǒng Ānguó Shàngshū zhuàn (Book of Documents with a Commentary by Kong Anguo), in former times wrongly attributed to Kong Anguo 孔安国 (fl. 1st century BCE), Western Han scholar and descendant of Confucius. This work provides commentary on the Shangshu and played a significant role in the transmission and interpretation of both the “Modern Script” and “Old Script” versions. Although the original text is largely lost, later scholars and compilations refer to its content, making it an important source in the study of Shangshu textual tradition.

Kong Yingda
Kong Yingda 孔颖达 Kǒng Yǐngdá (ca. 574–648), Tang-dynasty Confucian scholar and chief editor of the Wujing zhengyi (五经正义). Compiler of Shangshu zhengyi.

=== L ===
Liu Yu
Liu Yu 刘馀 Liú Yú (Prince Gong of Lu), a Han-dynasty prince who was said to have discovered the Guwen Shangshu hidden in the walls of Confucius’ residence.

=== M ===
Mao Qiling
Mao Qiling 毛奇齡 Máo Qíling (1623–1716), Qing-dynasty scholar and philologist. In his Guwen Shangshu yuanci 古文尚書冤詞 (In Defence of the Old Text Documents) he defended the authenticity of the Guwen Shangshu against the textual criticism of Yan Ruoqu. Mao Qiling authored numerous commentaries and writings on the Confucian classics, and his debates with Yan Ruoqu are considered a landmark case (公案 gong’an) in the history of Shangshu textual criticism.

Ma Rong
Ma Rong 馬融 (79–166) Eastern Han dynasty, see Guwen Shangshu Ma-Zheng zhu (by Sun Xingyan).

Mei Ze
Mei Ze 梅赜 Méi Zé (fl. 4th c.), Eastern Jin scholar who presented the so-called Guwen Shangshu to the court; this version is now widely regarded as apocryphal.

=== P ===
Pingjinguan congshu
Pingjinguan congshu 平津馆丛书 Píngjīnguǎn cóngshū (“Pingjin Studio Series”), late Qing scholarly series edited and printed by Sun Xingyan, containing philological studies and classical commentaries, including Shangshu jinguwen zhushu.

Pi Xirui
Pi Xirui 皮锡瑞 Pí Xīruì (1800–1860), Qing-dynasty scholar and textual critic. Author of Shangshu dazhuan shuzheng (尚书大传疏证), in which he provided critical commentary and evidential notes on the Shangshu dazhuan, contributing to the study of the textual transmission and exegesis of the Shangshu. Author of Jinwen Shangshu kaozheng (今文尚书考证, Textual Verification of the Modern Script Shangshu), 30 juan, a key work in the study of the Shangshu transmission and exegesis.

=== Q ===
Qinghua jian Jinteng jishi
Qinghua jian Jinteng jishi 清华简〈金縢〉集释 Qīnghuá jiǎn Jīnténg jíshì (Collected Annotations on the “Jinteng” Tsinghua Bamboo Slips), a modern scholarly edition providing comprehensive commentary on the Jinteng texts discovered among the Tsinghua Bamboo Slips. Published in the series Qinghua jian jishi congshu 清华简集释丛书 (Qīnghuá jiǎn jíshì cóngshū, Collected Annotations Series on the Tsinghua Bamboo Slips), a series of scholarly editions compiling commentaries and studies on various texts from the Tsinghua Bamboo Slips.

Qu Wanli
Qu Wanli 屈萬里 Qū Wànlǐ (1907–1979), modern Chinese philologist and historian. Author of Shangshu shiyi (尚書釋義) and Shangshu jingu jinyi (尚書今詁今譯), which combine traditional commentary with modern philological and linguistic insights into the Shangshu.

=== S ===
Shangshu (Ikeda Suetoshi)
Shangshu 尚書 (Shōsho, Book of Documents), by Ikeda Suetoshi 池田末利 (1910–2000). A comprehensive modern Japanese study and annotated translation of the Shangshu, discussing its textual formation, structure, and philological problems. The work represents one of the major twentieth-century Japanese contributions to Shangshu exegesis and comparative classical studies. Zenshaku Kanbun taikei 全釈漢文大系 (Compendium of Chinese texts with complete interpretations in Japanese) 11 Shangshu 尚書. Shueisha, Tokyo 1976

Shangshu bushu
Shangshu bushu 尚书补疏 Shàngshū bǔshū (Supplementary Annotations on the Shangshu), two juan, by Jiao Xun 焦循, important in Qing commentary tradition on the Shangshu.

Shangshu dazhuan
Shangshu dazhuan 尚书大传 Shàngshū dàzhuàn (Great Commentary on the Shangshu), an ancient commentary on the Shangshu that provides extensive explanations and interpretations of its chapters. Traditionally attributed to early scholars, it represents an important stage in the transmission and exegetical history of the Shangshu, influencing later commentaries, including works by Kong Anguo and subsequent Han and Qing scholars.

Shangshu dazhuan buzhu
Shangshu dazhuan buzhu 尚书大传补注 Shàngshū dàzhuàn bǔzhù (“Supplementary Notes on the Shangshu zazhuan”), Qing-dynasty work by Wang Kaiyun 王闿运, published in the Xiangqilou quanshu (湘绮楼全书). This text adds supplementary annotations to the Shangshu Dazhuan, further elaborating on its chapters and interpretations, and is important for understanding the Qing scholarly tradition of Shangshu exegesis.

Shangshu dazhuan shuzheng
Shangshu dazhuan shuzheng 尚书大传疏证 Shàngshū dàzhuàn shūzhèng (Annotations and evidential notes on the Shangshu dazhuan), Qing-dynasty scholarly work by Pi Xirui 皮锡瑞, published in the Shifutang congshu (师伏堂丛书). The book provides critical commentary and textual notes on the Shangshu Dazhuan, contributing to the study of the textual transmission and exegesis of the Shangshu.

Shangshu Guwen shuzheng
Shangshu Guwen shuzheng 尚书古文疏证 Shàngshū Gǔwén shūzhèng, also known as Guwen Shangshu shuzheng 古文尚书疏证 Gǔwén Shàngshū shūzhèng (Evidential Annotations on the Old Script Shangshu)

Shangshu guyi
Shangshu guyi 尚书古义 Shàngshū gǔyì (“Ancient Meanings of the Shangshu”), Qing-dynasty work by Hui Dong focusing on linguistic and semantic interpretation of the Shangshu.

Shangshu hou'an
Shangshu hou'an 尚書後案 Shàngshū hòu'àn (Later Case on the Shangshu), a Qing-dynasty study by Wang Mingsheng 王鳴盛. The work continues the critical examination of the Shangshu textual tradition, analyzing issues of authenticity and interpretation in the wake of earlier scholarship such as that of Yan Ruoqu.

Shangshu jingu jinyi
Shangshu jingu jinyi 尚書今詁今譯 Shàngshū jīngǔ jīnyì (Modern Explanation and Translation of the Shangshu), by Qu Wanli 屈萬里, offering modern-language paraphrases and interpretations of the Shangshu, bridging traditional exegesis and contemporary scholarship.

Shangshu jinguwen zhushu
Shangshu jinguwen zhushu 尚书今古文注疏 Shàngshū jīngǔwén zhùshū (“Annotations and Subcommentaries on the Modern and Ancient Texts of the Shangshu”), Qing-dynasty comparative commentary by Sun Xingyan on the “New Text” and “Old Text” versions. Published in Pingjinguan congshu.

Shangshu jizhu yinshu
Shangshu jizhu yinshu 尚书集注音疏 Shàngshū jízhù yīnshū (Collected Commentary with Phonetic Notes on the Shangshu), 12 juan, by Jiang Sheng 江声 (1721–1799), providing textual and phonetic annotations for the Shangshu.

Shangshu juyao
Shangshu juyao 尚书举要 Shàngshū jǔyào (“Essentials of the Shangshu”), concise late-Qing overview of key textual and interpretive issues of the Shangshu by Chen Yan. Published in Shiyishi congshu.

Shangshu Kongshi zhuan
Shangshu Kongshi zhuan 尚书孔氏传 Shàngshū Kǒngshì zhuàn (Kong family Commentary on the Shangshu), also known as the pseudo-Kong Anguo Shangshu zhuan 伪《孔安国尚书传》. This text was traditionally attributed to the Kong family but is now considered apocryphal, forming part of the Old Script (Guwen) Shangshu tradition and reflecting later editorial and exegetical interventions.

Shangshu Kongzhuan canzheng
Shangshu Kongzhuan canzheng 尚书孔传参正 Shàngshū Kǒngzhuàn cānzhèng (Collated Corrections on the Kong Commentary of the Shangshu), 36 juan, by Wang Xianqian 王先谦, contributing to the critical study of the Shangshu textual tradition.

Shangshu shiyi
Shangshu shiyi 尚書釋義 (Shàngshū Shìyì, Explanations of the Shangshu), by Qu Wanli 屈萬里 (1907–1979), a detailed interpretive commentary on the Shangshu, focusing on philological clarification and modern understanding of classical terms.

Shangshu tonglun
Shangshu tonglun 尚書通論 Shàngshū tōnglùn (General Treatise on the Shangshu), by Chen Mengjia 陳夢家 (1911–1966). Originally published in Shanghai by Shangwu yinshuguan (商務印書館) in 1956 and reissued with important appendices in Beijing by Zhonghua shuju (中华书局) in 1985. The work provides a comprehensive study of the Shangshu, integrating philological, historical, and archaeological perspectives.

Shangshu xungu
Shangshu xungu 尚书训诂 Shàngshū xùngǔ (Exegesis of the Shangshu), one juan, by Wang Yinzhi 王引之, a foundational work in Qing philology and Shangshu textual criticism.

Shangshu yinlun
Shangshu yinlun 尚書引論 (Shàngshū Yǐnlùn, Introductory Discussions on the Shangshu), by Zhang Xitang 張西堂 (20th cent.). A modern introductory study of the Shangshu, presenting an overview of its textual history, structure, and major exegetical issues. The work serves as a synthesis of traditional Chinese scholarship and modern critical approaches to the Shangshu.

Shangshu zhengdu
Shangshu zhengdu 尚书正读 Shàngshū zhèngdú (“Correct Reading of the Shangshu”), 20th-century critical interpretation by Zeng Yunqian, published by Zhonghua shuju (1964).

Shangshu zhengyi
Shangshu zhengyi 尚书正义 Shàngshū zhèngyì (“Correct Meaning of the Shangshu”), Tang-dynasty commentary by Kong Yingda, included in Shisanjing zhushu.

Shisanjing zhushu
Shisanjing zhushu 十三经注疏 Shísānjīng zhùshū (“Commentaries and Subcommentaries on the Thirteen Classics”), Tang compilation of canonical Confucian texts and commentaries, including Shangshu zhengyi; reprinted by Zhonghua shuju (1980).

Shiyishi congshu
Shiyishi congshu 石遗室丛书 Shíyíshì cóngshū, late Qing private collection of philological and literary studies, including Chen Yan’s Shangshu juyao.

Shu gu wei
Shu gu wei 书古微/書古微 Shū gǔ wēi (The Ancient Esoteric Meaning of the Book of Dokuments), 12 juan, compiled by Wei Yuan 魏源 of the Qing dynasty. The work analyzes how Western Han jinwen (Modern Script) Confucian scholars interpreted the ancient meanings of the Shangshu. Wei Yuan argues that not only the Guwen Shangshu and Shangshu Kongshi zhuan appearing in the Eastern Jin were forgeries, but even the Guwen Shangshu editions by Ma Rong and Zheng Xuan of the Eastern Han were not authentic texts of Kong Anguo. Included in the Huang Qing jingjie xubian (皇清经解续编).

Shu jizhuan
Shu jizhuan 书集传 Shū jíchuán (“Collected Commentary on the Documents”), commentary on the Shangshu by Cai Shen of the Southern Song, synthesizing interpretations from the Tang and earlier dynasties. Often printed together with the Shangshu in the Shisanjing zhushu.

Sibu congkan
Sibu congkan 四部丛刊 Sìbù cóngkān (“Collected Editions of the Four Categories”), large early 20th-century photoreproduction series of Song, Yuan, and Ming editions, organized by the traditional four divisions of Chinese learning: jing, shi, zi, and ji. It uses for the text a photographic reproduction of a Song dynasty woodblock print edition.

Sun Xingyan
Sun Xingyan 孙星衍 Sūn Xīngyǎn (1753–1818), Qing-dynasty philologist and bibliographer, known for his textual studies of ancient classics. Author of Shangshu jinguwen zhushu, published in Pingjinguan congshu. Author of Guwen Shangshu Ma-Zheng zhu (古文尚书马郑注, 10 juan)

=== W ===
Wang Kaiyun
Wang Kaiyun 王闿运 Wáng Kǎiyùn (1833–1916), Qing-dynasty scholar, historian, and philologist. Author of Shangshu dazhuan buzhu (尚书大传补注), which provides supplementary annotations to the Shangshu dazhuan, further elaborating on its chapters and interpretations. His work is an important reference in Qing scholarship on Shangshu textual criticism and exegesis.

Wang Mingsheng
Wang Mingsheng 王鳴盛 (Wáng Míngshèng, 1722–1798), Qing-dynasty scholar, historian, and textual critic. Author of Shangshu hou'an (尚書後案), in which he pursued further textual investigations into the Shangshu following Yan Ruoqu’s critical studies. His work is an important contribution to Qing evidential scholarship on the Shangshu.

Wang Xianqian
Wang Xianqian 王先谦 Wáng Xiānqiān (1842–1917), Qing-dynasty scholar. Author of Shangshu Kongchuan Canzheng (尚书孔传参正, Collated Corrections on the Kong Commentary of the Shangshu), thirty-six juan, contributing to the critical study of the Shangshu textual tradition.

Wang Yinzhi
Wang Yinzhi 王引之 Wáng Yǐnzhī (1744–1818), Qing-dynasty scholar. Author of Shangshu Xungu (尚书训诂, Exegesis of the Shangshu), a foundational work in Qing philology and Shangshu textual criticism.

Wei Guwen Shangshu
Wei Guwen Shangshu 伪古文尚书 Wěi Gǔwén Shàngshū (Forged Book of History in the Ancient Script), a term referring to the Guwen Shangshu chapters now considered apocryphal. These texts were presented as part of the “Old Script” version of the Shangshu but were largely composed after the Han dynasty and do not represent authentic ancient documents. They became central in Qing-dynasty textual debates, especially in the criticism of Yan Ruoqu, and influenced subsequent studies in Shangshu textual criticism.

Wei Yuan
Wei Yuan 魏源 Wèi Yuán (1794–1857), Qing-dynasty scholar and historian. Author of Shu gu wei 书古微, an influential work of the Qing jinwen school examining the interpretation of the Shangshu in the Western and Eastern Han dynasties, and critically assessing the authenticity of Old Script texts.

=== Y ===
Yang Zhongtai
Yang Zhongtai 杨钟泰 Yáng Zhōngtài, Qing-dynasty scholar. Author of Shangshu Jinwen 28 Pian Jie (尚书今文二十八篇解, Exegesis of the Twenty-eight Chapters of the Modern Script Shangshu), providing commentary on the Jinwen Shangshu version.

Yan Mao Guwen Shangshu gong'an
Yan Mao Guwen Shangshu gong'an 閻毛古文尚書公案 Yán Máo Gǔwén Shàngshū gōng’àn (”The Yan–Mao Case Concerning the Old Script Shangshu”), compiled by Dai Junren 戴君仁 (1901–1978) and published in 1963 by the Zhonghua shuju under the Zhonghua congshu weiyuanhui (中华丛书委员会). The work examines the Qing-dynasty debate between Yan Ruoqu 阎若璩 and Mao Qiling 毛奇龄 over the authenticity of the Guwen Shangshu, often regarded as a landmark case (公案 gong’an) in the history of Shangshu textual criticism.

Yan Ruoqu
Yan Ruoqu 阎若璩 Yán Ruòqú (1636–1704), Qing-dynasty scholar and textual critic who exposed the Old Script chapters of the Shangshu as forgeries. Author of Guwen Shangshu shuzheng, included in Huang Qing jingjie xubian.

Yishu
Yishu 逸书 Yìshū, another name for the Guwen Shangshu 古文尚书. The term refers to the so-called “lost” or recovered Old Script chapters of the Shangshu, which were rediscovered or reconstructed from various sources and commentaries after the Han dynasty.

=== Z ===
Zeng Yunqian
Zeng Yunqian 曾运乾 Zēng Yùnqián (1899–1964), modern scholar of Chinese classics. Author of Shangshu zhengdu (尚书正读), published by Zhonghua shuju in 1964.

Zhang Binglin
Zhang Binglin 章炳麟 Zhāng Bǐnglín (1868–1936), also known as Zhang Taiyan 章太炎, revolutionary intellectual, philologist, and classical scholar. Author of Guwen Shangshu shiyi, included in Zhangshi congshu xubian.

Zhang Xitang
Zhang Xitang 张西堂/張西堂 Zhāng Xītáng (1901–1960), modern Chinese scholar. Author of Shangshu yinlun (尚書引論), in which he offers an analytical introduction to the Shangshu, summarizing key developments in its transmission and interpretation from antiquity to modern scholarship.

Zhangshi congshu xubian
Zhangshi congshu xubian 章氏丛书续编 Zhāngshì cóngshū xùbiān (“Zhang Family Series, Continued Edition”), collection of works compiled by Zhang Binglin and followers, including Guwen Shangshu shiyi.

Zhang Taiyan
Zhang Taiyan 章太炎, see Zhang Binglin

Zhaodai congshu
Zhaodai congshu 昭代丛书 Zhāodài cóngshū (“Zhaodai Series”), Qing-dynasty collection of scholarly works on Confucian classics and philology, including Hui Dong’s Shangshu guyi.

Zheng Xuan
Zheng Xuan 郑玄/鄭玄 Zhèng Xuán (127–200), Eastern Han dynasty, see Guwen Shangshu Ma-Zheng zhu (by Sun Xingyan).

Zhonghua shuju
Zhonghua shuju 中华书局 Zhōnghuá shūjú (“Zhonghua Book Company”), 20th-century Beijing academic publisher specializing in critical editions of Chinese classics and modern reprints of traditional texts, including Shangshu zhengyi, Shisanjing zhushu, and Shangshu zhengdu.

== See also ==
- Glossary of Chinese philosophy

== Bibliography ==
- Hanyu da zidian. 1993 (one-volume edition)
- Zhongguo zhexue da cidian 中国哲学大辞典. Zhang Dainian 张岱年 (ed.). Shanghai cishu chubanshe 上海辞书出版社, Shanghai 2010
- Han-Ying Zhongguo zhexue cidian 汉英中国哲学辞典. Kaifeng 2002
- Yang Duanzhi 杨端志: Xunguxue 训诂学. 1985
- Edward L. Shaughnessy: "Shang shu (Shu ching)", in: Loewe, Michael (1993). Early Chinese Texts: A Bibliographical Guide. Berkeley: The Society for the Study of Early China and the Institute of East Asian Studies. OCLC 1348979043. p. 376-389 (for Japanese editions besides Ikeda Suetoshi, see p. 388 f.)
