= Liu Xin (scholar) =

Chinese scholar and politician (c. 46 BCE – 23 CE)

- Traditional Chinese: 劉歆
- Simplified Chinese: 刘歆
Transcriptions
Standard Mandarin
- Hanyu Pinyin: Liú Xīn
- Wade–Giles: Liu^{2} Hsin^{1}
- IPA: [ljǒʊ ɕín]
Yue: Cantonese
- Yale Romanization: Làuh Yām
- Jyutping: Lau4 Jam1
- IPA: [lɐw˩ jɐm˥]

Courtesy name
- Traditional Chinese: 子駿
- Simplified Chinese: 子骏
Transcriptions
Standard Mandarin
- Hanyu Pinyin: Zǐjùn
- Wade–Giles: Tzŭ^{3}-chün^{4}
- IPA: [dzì tɕwə̂n]
Yue: Cantonese
- Yale Romanization: Džjyùn
- Jyutping: Zi2-zeon3
- IPA: [tsi˧˥ tsɵn˧]

Liu Xin (c. 46 BCE – 23 CE), courtesy name Zijun, was a Chinese astronomer, classicist, imperial librarian, mathematician, and politician during the Western Han and Xin dynasties. He later changed his name to Liu Xiu (劉秀) due to the naming taboo of Emperor Ai of Han. He was the son of Imperial librarian Liu Xiang and an associate of other eminent thinkers such as the philosopher Huan Tan. Liu was a prominent supporter of the Old Text classics.

== Early life ==
Liu Xin was the son of Confucian scholar Liu Xiang (77–6 BCE). Liu was a distant relative of Liu Bang, the founder of the Han dynasty, and was thus a member of the ruling dynastic clan (the Liu family). Liu Xin's paternal grandfather ranked as a hou (侯, roughly 'marquess'). As a young man, Liu helped his father in cataloguing the contents of the imperial library, and his friendship with the well-connected minister Wang Mang brought him power and rewards, rising under Emperor Ai of Han to the rank of Palace Attendant and Chief Commandant of Imperial Equipages (侍中奉車都尉).

== Literary work ==
=== Librarian ===
As a curator of the imperial library he was the first to establish a library classification system and the first book notation system. At this time the library catalog was written on scrolls of fine silk and stored in silk bags. Liu Xin's Qilüe (七略; "Seven Surveys") has not survived, but it formed the basis for the later bibliographic treatise Yiwenzhi (藝文志; "Treatise on Arts and Letters") in the Book of Han, which acted as a model for later imperial bibliographies.

As the imperial librarian, Liu Xin both catalogued and annotated or edited ancient texts. These projects of his produced what became definitive texts of a number of orthodox canons of Chinese philosophy and history.

Liu Xin played an important role in the transmission of the Zuozhuan. A scholar of the Old Text School, he was attracted to the Zuozhuan's earlier graphical forms, whose inaccessibility deterred the compound exegesis found in the rival Chunqiu commentarial traditions. In editing the Zuozhuan with the assistance of Yin Xian (尹咸), Liu rearranged the material into chronological order to map more neatly onto the Chunqiu chronicle as the Gongyang and Guliang commentaries did. He aimed to have an imperial academician assigned to the work, a crucial bureaucratic step towards canonization in the official orthodoxy.

Liu's advocacy for the Zuozhuan was controversial in his own day, partly due to its lineage and prior reputation, and partly due to his own approach towards the situation. This scholarly dispute is sometimes taken as evidence for a larger dispute about classic texts written using variant scripts.

=== Old Text proponent ===
During Liu Xin's career, there may have been some debate about certain texts called guwen (古文, "Ancient Script Texts"). One set of manuscripts discovered by Kong Anguo in the Western Han was consistently labeled as guwen owing to the graphical forms it preserved, a script which had diverged during the Eastern Zhou from the more conservative script of the state of Qin which became the official and only standard following their unification in 221 BCE. As a consequence of the variant graphical forms, parts of the text were already difficult to decipher for Han scholars.

It is not clear to what extent the content of guwen works differed from the transmitted versions of the same titles, nor what criteria allowed for labeling a document guwen. It may have been the case that even a handful of words would suffice to impart this characteristic upon the text that contained them.

Liu Xin was attracted to guwen texts, and his position in the imperial library meant he was well placed to ensure that these versions would officially be considered the authoritative ones.

=== Integrity of transmitted literature ===
From the 19th through early 20th centuries, antiquarians and historians, beginning with Kang Youwei, accused Liu of excessive editing, to the point of falsifying historical texts. These criticisms were systematically analysed by the Doubting Antiquity School of historians. According to their theory, first articulated by Qian Mu in 1930, Liu edited ancient texts for political purposes, particularly the Rites of Zhou, the Zuozhuan, and the Mao commentary to the Shijing. This accusation of forgery had legitimate precedent: in the late 17th century Yan Ruoqu demonstrated that the transmitted Classic of History was mostly a forgery dating to the 4th century. This text had been based on the Ancient Script version, and only the parts that were present in the separately transmitted New Script version could be considered authentically early.

Liu Xin was a political ally of the powerful and divisive minister Wang Mang, who would go on to usurp the Han dynasty around the turn of the millennium for a brief period known as the Xin dynasty. As the imperial librarian, Liu had the power to establish the definitive redactions of ancient texts and expunge variant versions. According to his accusers, the librarian falsified accounts of ancient historical events, and inserted into the legendary lineage of ancient rulers figures or relationships that were either invented, or borrowed from separate legends. In this way, he created a narrative of ancient rulers and successive dynasties which satisfied the "five phases" theory, wherein each ruler and/or dynasty represented one of the five traditional Chinese elements (wuxing), between which the Mandate of Heaven rotated. An account thus falsified would satisfactorily explain the rule of the Han and Xin dynasties in terms of the phases they were said to represent, and according to the forgery theory, Liu Xin's edited account conveniently showed a series of successions between various claimed ancestors of the Han and Xin houses.

The possibility of Liu Xin's forgeries became a crucial question for the Doubting Antiquity School in their search for a rationalist past for China. They drew evidence from discrepancies between the texts edited by Liu and earlier or contemporaneous texts. For example, figures or events appearing in Liu's edited versions did not appear in earlier or contemporaneous texts. The forgery theory has been largely discredited.

== Scientific work ==
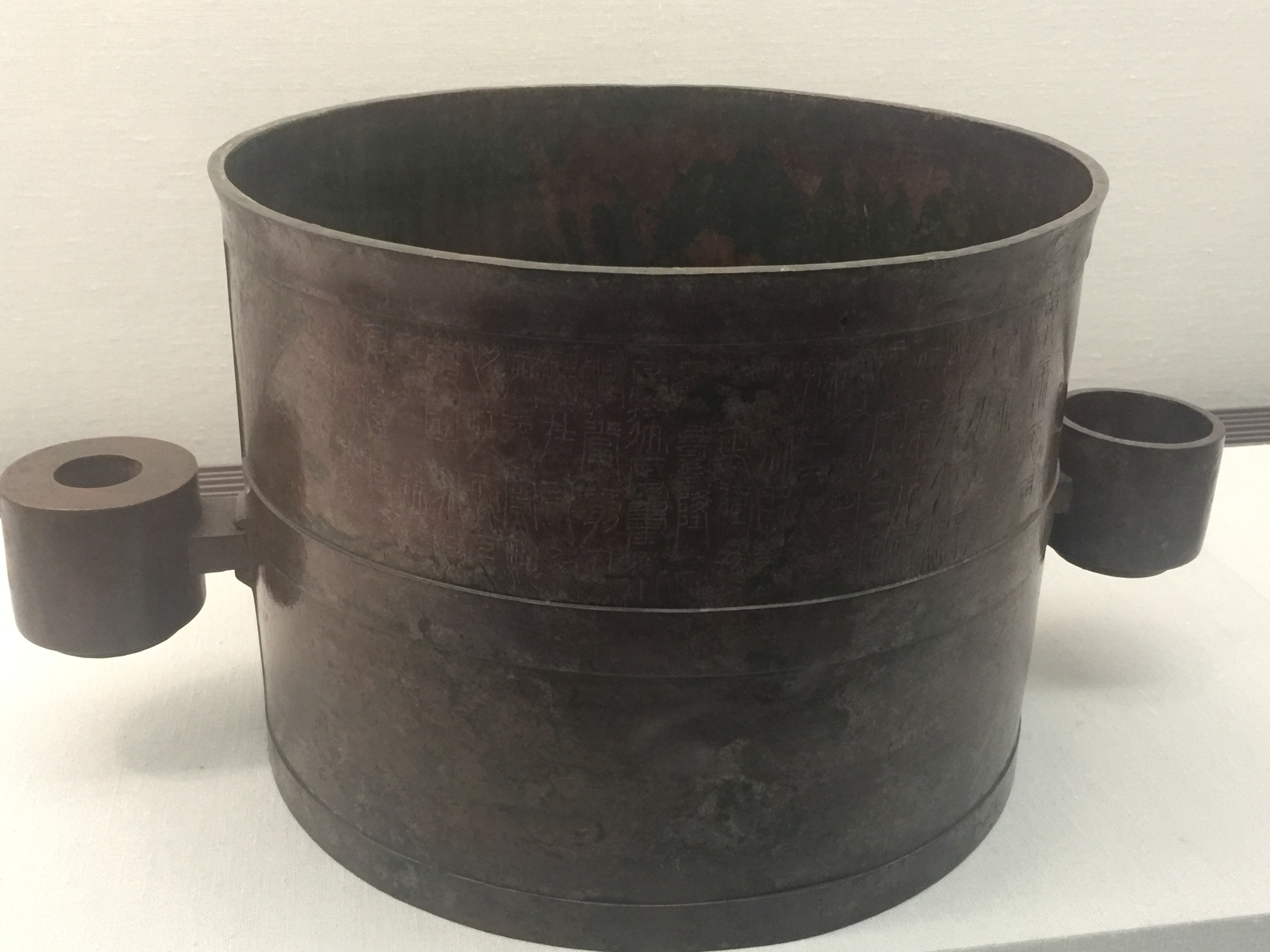
Wang Mang's jialiang, used by Liu Xin in scientific measurements, held in the National Palace Museum, Taipei

=== Calculation of pi (π) ===
For centuries before the usurpation of Wang Mang (r. 9–23), the Chinese had used the value of 3 for their calculation of pi, the ratio of a circle's circumference to its diameter. Some time between the years 1 and 5, Liu Xin was the first Chinese researcher to give a geometrical figure which implies the improved approximation π ≈ 3.1547, although the exact method he used to reach this figure is unknown. The original jialiang hu standard Liu Xin designed and used in his measurements is still extant. Sinologist Joseph Needham inspected it in Beijing, describing it as follows:

The standardised chia liang hu (has) a square with each side 1 chhih (foot) long, and outside it a circle. The distance from each corner of the square to the circle (thiao phang) is 9 li 5 hao. The area of the circle (mu) is 162 (square) tshun (inches), the depth 1 chhih (foot), and the volume (of the whole) 1620 (cubic) tshun (inches).

Later early Chinese mathematicians such as Zhang Heng (78–139) and Liu Hui (fl. 3rd century) would improve Liu's calculation for pi, and were improved upon in turn by Zu Chongzhi (429–500).

=== Standards and measures ===
As Emperor of Xin, Wang Mang attempted to return to the lost ways of the ancient sage-kings, a legendary golden age of order and peace. Assisting him in some of the practicalities of this ambition was Liu Xin. Upon ascending the throne, Wang Mang named Liu Xin his Guoshi (國師, "Professor Laureate"), a newly created office which was one of the Four Viziers (四輔, named after a legend about a constellation), the most powerful and exalted ministers in the empire. As part of the rebranding schema implemented across the government, Liu Xin gained the noble title "Eminence of New Excellence" (嘉新公). He assisted in standardising the measures of liquid volume and the harmonic frequencies of musical instruments. The jialiang hu used to calculate pi was designed as the standard for the five measures of liquid volume stipulated by statute, and was constructed with a separate compartment for each of them.

In the course of his scientific work, Liu wrote a treatise which survives in the Book of Han: Lüli zhi (律曆志, "Treatise on Standards and Calendrics"). This text records detailed information about Han dynasty mathematics, measures of length and volume, harmonics, weights and balances, and the calendar via wuxing theory.

=== Astronomy and natural philosophy ===
As a classicist, Liu Xin was able to support the legitimation of his patron Wang Mang as a restorer of an ancient mode of governance, and as a proponent and theorist of the "generative cycle" of the popular "five phases" theory, Liu advised the new emperor on ritual matters to better accord with these fundamental essences. Liu additionally developed a new more accurate model of astronomy, the Triple Concordance calendar (三統歷; San tong li), for predicting the motion of heavenly bodies. In the second half of the 20th century, a crater on Mars was named in his honor.

== Death ==
Although Liu Xin was originally a loyal partisan of Wang Mang, after Wang's troops suffered defeat on July 7, 23 at the Battle of Kunyang, Liu Xin plotted with others to overthrow Wang Mang. The plot was discovered, and all the conspirators committed suicide or were executed.

== Sources ==
- Ban Gu; Ban Zhao; Ban Biao (1962) [111]. Book of Han 漢書. Zhonghua Shuju.
- Bielenstein, Hans (1986). "Wang Mang, the Restoration of the Han Dynasty, and Later Han". In Denis Twitchett; Michael Loewe (eds.). The Cambridge History of China: Volume I: the Ch'in and Han Empires, 221 B.C. – A.D. 220. Cambridge: Cambridge University Press. ISBN 0-521-24327-0.
- Cullen, Christopher (2007) [1996]. Astronomy and Mathematics in Ancient China: The Zhou Bi Suan Jing. Cambridge: Cambridge University Press. pp. 31–33. doi:10.1017/CBO9780511563720.003. ISBN 9780511563720.
- Loewe, Michael (2016). Problems of Han Administration: Ancestral Rites, Weights and Measures, and the Means of Protest. China Studies, Vol. 33. Brill. doi:10.1163/9789004314900. ISBN 9789004314900.
- Needham, Joseph (1986). Science and Civilization in China: Volume 3, Mathematics and the Sciences of the Heavens and the Earth. Taipei: Caves Books.
- Nylan, Michael (1994). "The Chin wen/Ku wen Controversy in Han Times". T'oung Pao. 80 (1). Brill: 83–145. doi:10.1163/156853294X00070. JSTOR 4528622.
- Zuo Tradition, Zuozhuan, 左傳: Commentary on the "Spring and Autumn Annals". Translated by Stephen Durrant; Wai-yee Li; David Schaberg. University of Washington Press. 2016. ISBN 9780295806730. OCLC 1012881322.

=== Further reading ===
- Qiu Hansheng (邱漢生) (2000). "Liu Xin". Encyclopedia of China (in Chinese) (Philosophy ed.).
