= Mao Qiling =

Chinese scholar and philologist (1623–1716)

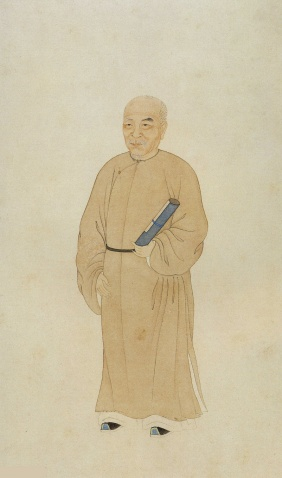

Mao Qiling (simplified Chinese: 毛奇龄; traditional Chinese: 毛奇齡; pinyin: Máo Qílíng; Wade–Giles: Mao Ch'i-ling; 1623–1716) was a Chinese scholar and philologist of the early Qing dynasty. A native of Xiaoshan in Zhejiang province, he became a licentiate at the age of fifteen sui. After the fall of the Ming dynasty in 1644, he refused to serve the Qing. In 1679, however, he took part in and passed a special honorary examination held by the Kangxi Emperor to attract scholars who had not yet announced their allegiance to the new dynasty. He was then appointed to the compilation of the official History of Ming. After retiring from office in 1687, he went to live in Hangzhou (Zhejiang), where he taught many disciples.

A scholar of wide learning, Mao compiled works on the Confucian Classics and on phonetics, music, history, and geography. After Mao's death his writings were collected and published as an eighty-volume work, The Collected Works of Xihe ("Xihe" was a popular pseudonym of Mao's). He was famous for vehemently opposing the orthodox commentaries on the Classics by Song-dynasty Neo-Confucians like Zhu Xi. He also unsuccessfully attacked Yan Ruoju's demonstration that the Old Text chapters of the Book of Documents (one of the Five Classics) were Han-dynasty forgeries.

In the Shang shu guangting fu (Record of a broad understanding of the documents), Mao presented criticism of the earlier association between the early nonary cosmographic schemes and the Luoshu.

== Bibliography ==
- Elman, Benjamin A. (2001), From Philosophy to Philology: Intellectual and Social Aspects of Change in Late Imperial China, Los Angeles: UCLA Asian Pacific Monograph Series, ISBN 1-883191-05-X.
- Henderson, John B. (1995), "Chinese Cosmographical Thought: The High Intellectual Tradition", in J. B. Harley; David Woodward (eds.), History of Cartography, Volume Two, Book Two, Cartography in the Traditional East and Southeast Asian Societies, pp. 203–27.
- Legge, James (1893), "Prolegomena", in James Legge (transl.) (ed.), The Confucian Analects, The Great Learning & The Doctrine of the Mean, Reprint: New York, NY: Cosimo, 2009, ISBN 978-1-60520-644-8.
- Tu, Lien-chê (1943). "Mao Ch'i-ling" . In Hummel, Arthur W. Sr. (ed.). Eminent Chinese of the Ch'ing Period. United States Government Printing Office. pp. 563–564.
- Wang, Hui (2008), Translating Chinese Classics in a Colonial Context, Bern: Peter Lang, ISBN 978-3-03911-631-7.
