= Fu Yue =

- 傅說
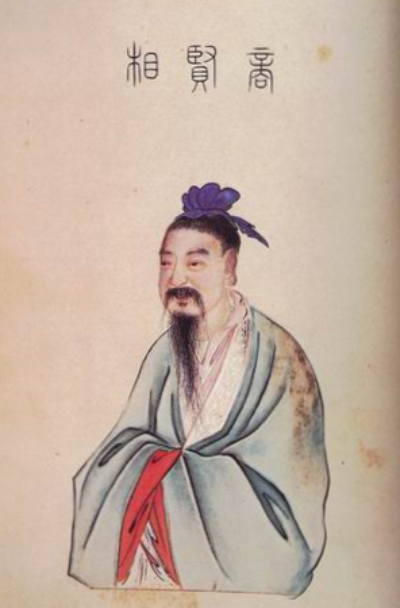
- Qing dynasty illustration from the Qianlong era, featuring Fu Yue's name in small seal script.
- Born: Shang dynasty
- Other names: Family name: Fu (傅); Given name: Yue (說); Alternate name: Hou Que (侯雀)
- Occupation: Politician

Minister of Shang China
- Incumbent
- Assumed office c. 12th Century BC
- Monarch: Wu Ding

Chinese name
- Traditional Chinese: 傅說
- Simplified Chinese: 傅说
Transcriptions
Standard Mandarin
- Hanyu Pinyin: Fù Yuè
- Wade–Giles: Fu Yüeh

Fu Yue ("Mentor Yue"), also known as Hou Que (侯雀; Hóu Què, "Lord Sparrow"), was an official who served as minister from Fuyan (present-day Pinglu County, Shanxi) under the king Wu Ding 武丁 of the Shang 商 dynasty, who reigned around c. 1250–c. 1200 BCE. He has also been defined anachronistically a "premier."

== Life ==
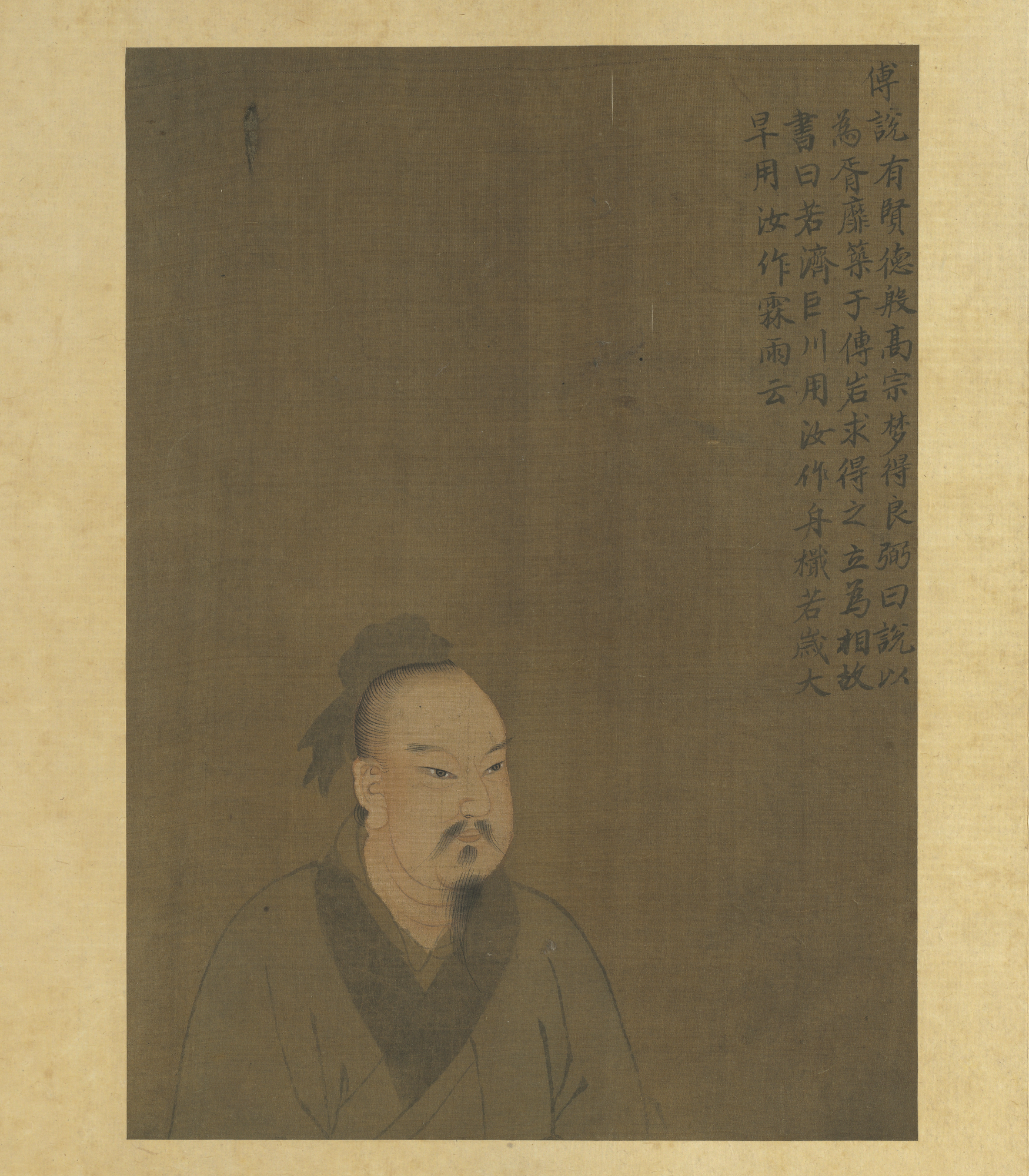
Portrait of Fu Yue (National Palace Museum)

Fu Yue was originally a labourer, skilled at making walls for defence. Being unable to subscribe towards the repair of certain roads, he then worked upon them himself. According to the Records of the Historian, Wu Ding dreamt he would obtain a sage person named Yue 說, and dispatched his officials throughout his reign to find him according to the features seen in the dream, Fu Yue was discovered in a workshed and received the appointment. The life is also narrated in the voice of minister Bai Gong Zi Chang (白公子張) in the Guoyu.

At his death, it is said that he became the constellation known as the Sieve (箕), one of the twenty-eight mansions of the zodiac, which forms a part of Sagittarius. The star G Scorpii (Fuyue) is named after him.

== Textual sources ==
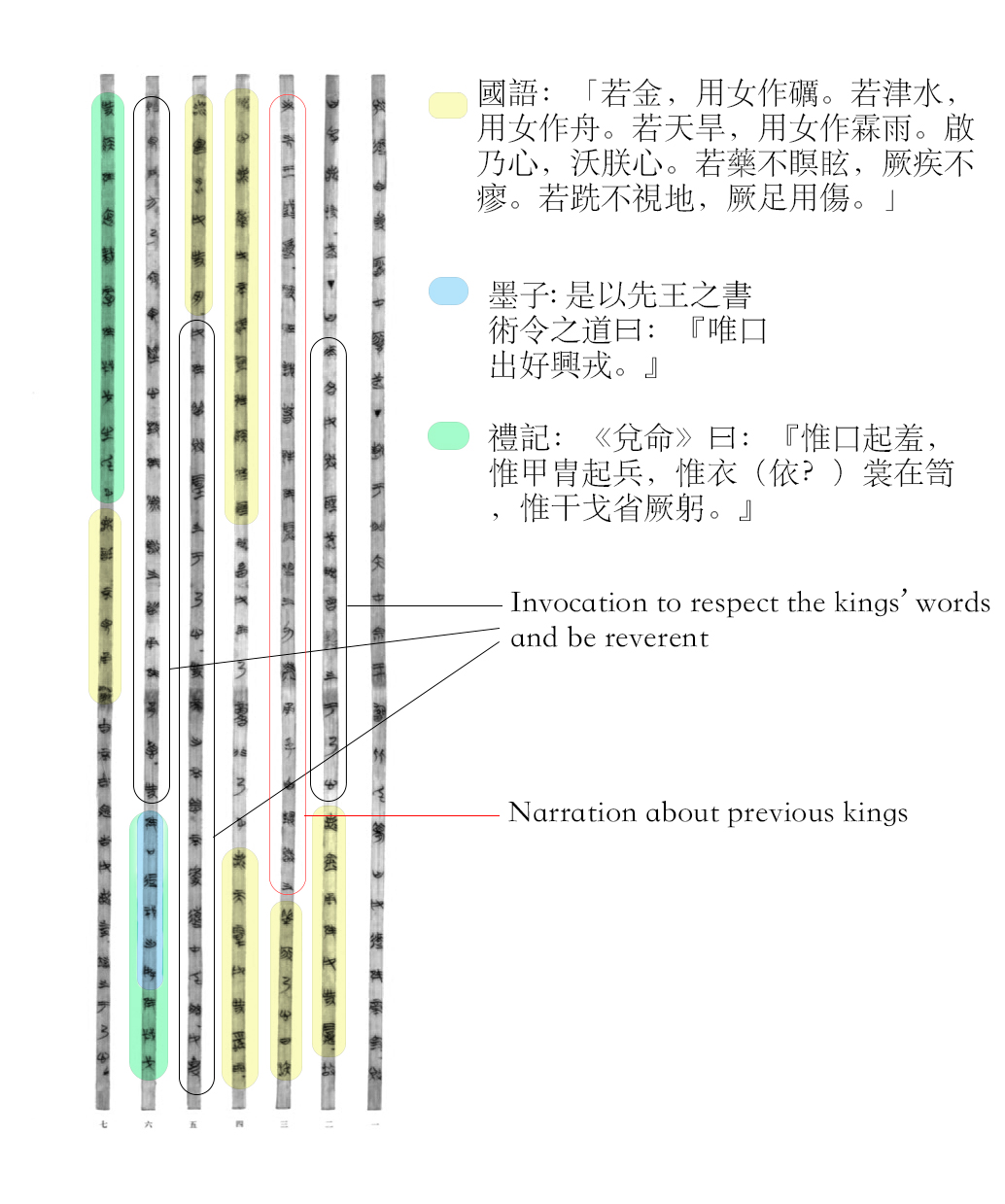
Structure and parallels of “Fu Yue zhi ming”, second section

The Shangshu chapter "Yue ming" 說命 represents a dialogue between Wu Ding and Fu Yue; Yan Ruoqu 閻若璩 demonstrated that this chapter is one of the 25 that he believed were created by Mei Ze (Fl. 4th CE). These are known as the guwen 古文 chapters, often labelled as "forgeries." In 2012, a bamboo manuscript divided in three sections titled "Fu Yue zhi ming 傅說之命" (or, one may say, three distinct manuscripts bearing the same title; the title appears on the verso side of the last strip in each section) has been published in the third volume of the Tsinghua manuscripts collection. While initial claims were made that this represents the "real" (zhenzheng 真正) chapter "Yue ming" originally belonging to the Shangshu and later replaced by Mei Ze, this seems unlikely for several reasons, among which:

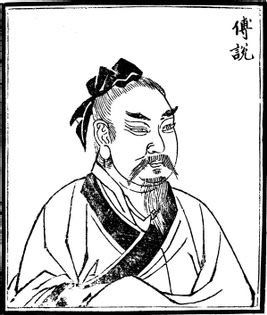
1932 illustration.

- All the existing evidence points at the fact that the Shangshu became a stable collection around the end of the Western Han dynasty, and there is no evidence that a chapter named "Yue ming" existed until later;
- The Liji contains a total of 5 quotations from the "Yue ming", only one of which is found in slightly different wording in the Tsinghua "Fu Yue zhi ming." This must be taken into account in arguments supporting the idea that the Tsinghua manuscript is the "real" chapter.
- There are redundancies and discrepancies among the three sections if one were to read them as a single continuous text.
