= Book of Documents =

One of the Five Classics of ancient Chinese literature

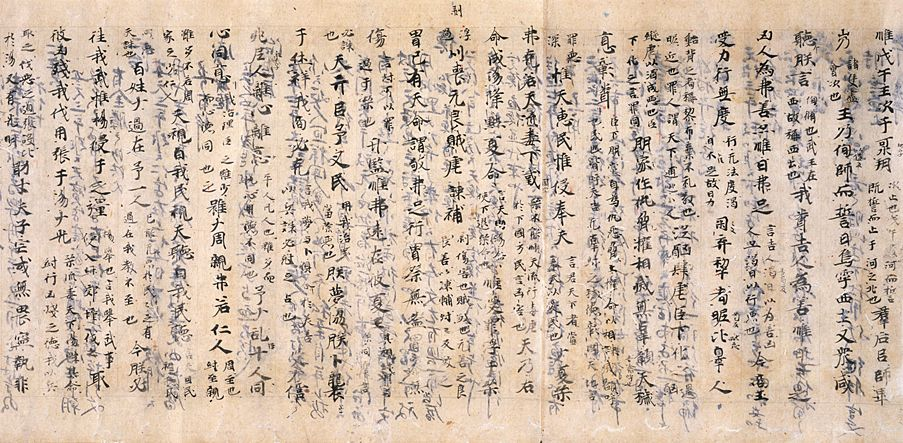
- A page of an annotated Book of Documents manuscript from the 7th century, held by the Tokyo National Museum
- Author: Various; trad. compiled by Confucius
- Original title: 書
- Language: Old Chinese
- Subject: Compilation of rhetorical prose
- Publication place: China

Book of Documents
- "Book of Documents" (Shujing) written using traditional (top) and simplified (bottom) characters

Chinese name
- Traditional Chinese: 書經
- Simplified Chinese: 书经
- Hanyu Pinyin: Shūjīng
- Literal meaning: "Classic of Documents"
Transcriptions
Standard Mandarin
- Hanyu Pinyin: Shūjīng
- Gwoyeu Romatzyh: Shujing
- Wade–Giles: Shu^{1}-ching^{1}
- IPA: [ʂú.tɕíŋ]
Hakka
- Romanization: Su^{1}-gang^{1}
Yue: Cantonese
- Yale Romanization: Syū-gīng
- Jyutping: Syu1-ging1
- IPA: [sy˥.kɪŋ˥]
Southern Min
- Hokkien POJ: Chu-keng
- Tâi-lô: Tsu-king
Middle Chinese
- Middle Chinese: sho-geng
Old Chinese
- Baxter–Sagart (2014): *s-ta k-lˤeng

Alternative Chinese name
- Traditional Chinese: 尚書
- Simplified Chinese: 尚书
- Hanyu Pinyin: Shàngshū
- Literal meaning: "Venerated Documents"
Transcriptions
Standard Mandarin
- Hanyu Pinyin: Shàngshū
- Wade–Giles: Shang^{4}-shu^{1}
- IPA: [ʂâŋ.ʂú]
Hakka
- Romanization: Song^{4}-su^{1}
Yue: Cantonese
- Yale Romanization: Seuhng-syū
- Jyutping: Soeng6-syu1
Southern Min
- Hokkien POJ: Siōng-su
- Tâi-lô: Siōng-su
Middle Chinese
- Middle Chinese: dʒjàng-sho
Old Chinese
- Baxter–Sagart (2014): *dang-s s-ta

Second alternative Chinese name
- Traditional Chinese: 書
- Simplified Chinese: 书
- Hanyu Pinyin: Shū
- Literal meaning: "Documents"
Transcriptions
Standard Mandarin
- Hanyu Pinyin: Shū
- Wade–Giles: Shu^{1}
- IPA: [ʂú]
Yue: Cantonese
- Yale Romanization: Syū
- Jyutping: Syu1
Southern Min
- Hokkien POJ: Chu
- Tâi-lô: Tsu
Middle Chinese
- Middle Chinese: ʃo
Old Chinese
- Baxter–Sagart (2014): *s-ta

Vietnamese name
- Vietnamese alphabet: Kinh Thư
- Hán-Nôm: 經書

Korean name
- Hangul: 서경
- Hanja: 書經
Transcriptions
- Revised Romanization: Seogyeong

Japanese name
- Kanji: 書経
Transcriptions
- Romanization: Shokyō

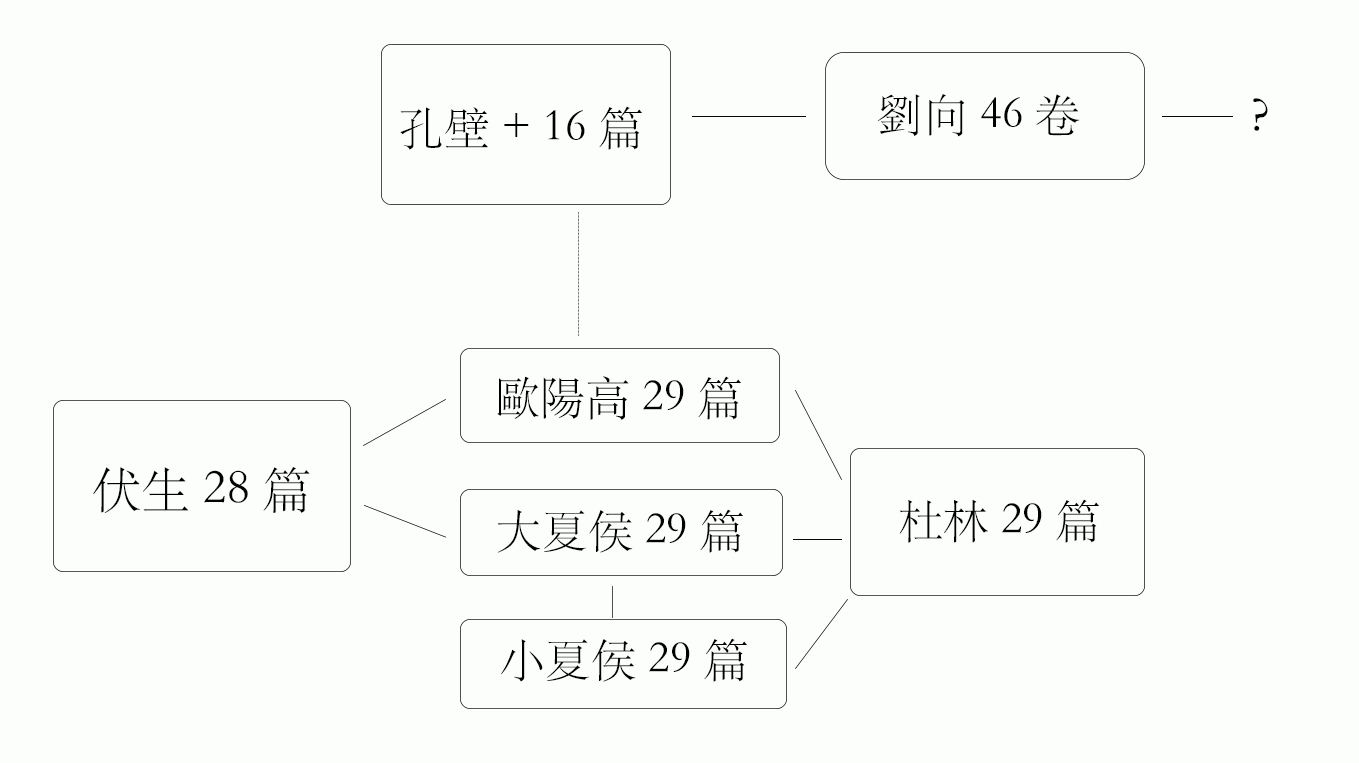
Lineage of editions during the Han dynasty

The Book of Documents (Chinese: 書經; pinyin: Shūjīng; Wade–Giles: Shu King) or the Classic of History, (Note: Or simply as the Shujing or Shangshu (尚书; Shàngshū; 'Venerated Documents')) is one of the Five Classics of ancient Chinese literature. It is a collection of rhetorical prose attributed to figures of ancient China, and served as the foundation of Chinese political philosophy for over two millennia.

The Book of Documents was the subject of one of China's oldest literary controversies, between proponents of different versions of the text. A version was preserved from Qin Shi Huang's burning of books and burying of scholars by scholar Fu Sheng, in 29 chapters (piān 篇). This group of texts were referred to as "Modern Texts" (or "Current Script"; jīnwén 今文), because they were written with the script in use at the beginning of the Western Han dynasty.

A longer version of the Documents was said to be discovered in the wall of Confucius's family estate in Qufu by his descendant Kong Anguo in the late 2nd century BC. The texts were referred to as "Old Texts" (gǔwén 古文), because they were written in the script that predated the standardization of Chinese script during the Qin. Compared to the Modern Texts, the "Old Texts" material had 16 more chapters. The Old Texts had been lost at the end of the Eastern Han dynasty, while the Modern Texts text enjoyed circulation, in particular in Ouyang Gao's study, called the Ouyang Shangshu (歐陽尚書). This was the basis of studies by Ma Rong and Zheng Xuan during the Eastern Han.

In 317 AD, Mei Ze presented to the Eastern Jin court a 58-chapter (59 if the preface is counted) Book of Documents as Kong Anguo's version of the text. This version was accepted, despite the doubts of a few scholars, and later was canonized as part of Kong Yingda's project. It was only in the 17th century that Qing dynasty scholar Yan Ruoqu proposed that the "Old Texts" were fabrications "reconstructed" in the 3rd or 4th centuries AD.

In the transmitted edition, texts are grouped into four sections representing different eras: the legendary reign of Yu the Great, and the Xia, Shang and Zhou dynasties. The Zhou section accounts for over half the text. Some of its modern-script chapters are among the earliest examples of Chinese prose, recording speeches from the early years of the Zhou dynasty in the late 11th century BC. Although the other three sections purport to record earlier material, most scholars believe that even the New Script chapters in these sections were composed later than those in the Zhou section, with chapters relating to the earliest periods being as recent as the 4th or 3rd centuries BC.

== Textual history ==
The history of the various versions of the Documents is complex and has been the subject of a long-running literary and philosophical controversy.

=== Early references ===
According to a later tradition, the Book of Documents was compiled by Confucius (551–479 BC) as a selection from a much larger group of documents, with some of the remainder being included in the Yi Zhou Shu. However, the early history of both texts is obscure. Beginning with Confucius, writers increasingly drew on the Documents to illustrate general principles, though it seems that several different versions were in use.

Six citations to unnamed chapters of the Documents appear in the Analects. While Confucius invoked the pre-dynastic emperors Yao and Shun, as well as figures from the Xia and Shang dynasties, he complained of the lack of documentation prior to the Zhou. The Documents were cited increasingly frequently in works through the 4th century BC, including in the Mencius, Mozi and Zuo Zhuan. These authors favoured documents relating to Yao, Shun and the Xia dynasty, chapters now believed to have been written in the Warring States period. The chapters currently believed to be the oldest—mostly relating to the early Zhou—were little used by Warring States authors, perhaps due to the difficulty of the archaic language or a less familiar worldview. Fewer than half the passages quoted by these authors are present in the received text. Authors such as Mencius and Xunzi, while quoting the Documents, refused to accept it as genuine in its entirety. Their attitude contrasts with the reverence later shown to the text during the Han dynasty, when its compilation was attributed to Confucius.

=== Han dynasty: Modern and Old Scripts ===
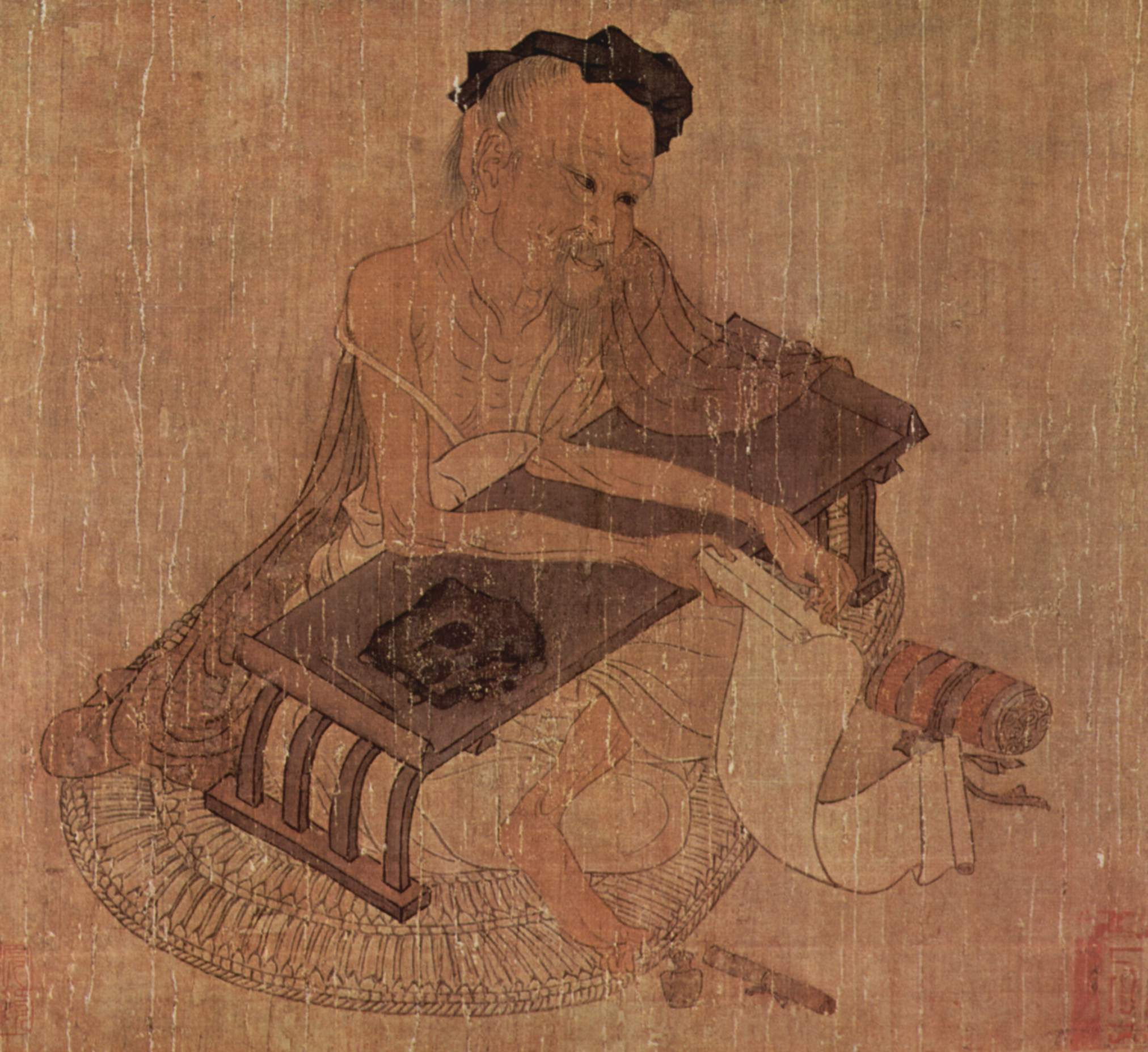
Fu Sheng expounding on the Classic, attributed to Wang Wei (8th century)

Many copies of the work were destroyed in the Burning of Books during the Qin dynasty. Fu Sheng reconstructed part of the work from hidden copies in the late 3rd to early 2nd century BC, at the start of the succeeding Han dynasty. The texts that he transmitted were known as the "Modern Script" (今文 jīn wén) because it was written in the clerical script. It originally consisted of 29 chapters, but the chapter "Great Speech" (Tài shì 太誓) was lost shortly afterwards and replaced by a new version. The remaining 28 chapters were later expanded into 30 when Ouyang Gao divided the "Pangeng" chapter into three sections.

During the reign of Emperor Wu, renovations of the home of Confucius are said to have uncovered several manuscripts hidden within a wall, including a longer version of the Documents. These texts were referred to as "Old Script" because they were written in the pre-Qin seal script. They were transcribed into clerical script and interpreted by Confucius' descendant Kong Anguo. Han dynasty sources give contradictory accounts of the nature of this find. According to the commonly repeated account of the Book of Han, the "Old Script" texts included the chapters preserved by Fu Sheng, another version of the "Great Speech" chapter and some 16 additional ones. It is unclear what happened to these manuscripts. According to the Book of Han, Liu Xiang collated the Old Script version against the three main "Modern Script" traditions, creating a version of the Documents that included both groups. This was championed by his son Liu Xin, who requested in a letter to Emperor Ai the establishment of a boshi position for its study. But this did not happen. Most likely, this edition put together by the imperial librarians was lost in the chaos that ended the Western Han dynasty, and the later movement of the capital and imperial library.

A list of 100 chapter titles was also in circulation; many are mentioned in the Records of the Grand Historian, but without quoting the text of the other chapters.

The shu were designated one of the Five Classics when Confucian works made official by Emperor Wu of Han, and jīng ('classic') was added to its name. The term Shàngshū 'venerated documents' was also used in the Eastern Han. The Xiping Stone Classics, set up outside the imperial academy in 175–183 but since destroyed, included a Modern Script version of the Documents. Most Han dynasty scholars ignored the Old Script version, and it disappeared by the end of the dynasty.

=== Claimed recovery of Old Script texts ===
A version of the Documents that included the "Old Script" texts was allegedly rediscovered by the scholar Mei Ze during the 4th century, and presented to the imperial court of the Eastern Jin. His version consisted of the 31 modern script texts in 33 chapters, and 18 additional old script texts in 25 chapters, with a preface and commentary purportedly written by Kong Anguo. This was presented as Guwen Shangshu 古文尚書, and was widely accepted. It was the basis of the Shàngshū zhèngyì (尚書正義 'Correct interpretation of the Documents') published in 653 and made the official interpretation of the Documents by imperial decree. The oldest extant copy of the text, included in the Kaicheng Stone Classics (833–837), contains all of these chapters.

Since the Song dynasty, starting from Wu Yu (吳棫), many doubts had been expressed concerning the provenance of the allegedly rediscovered "Old Script" texts in Mei Ze's edition. In the 16th century, Mei Zhuo (梅鷟) published a detailed argument that these chapters, as well as the preface and commentary, were forged in the 3rd century AD using material from other historical sources such as the Zuo Commentary and the Records of the Grand Historian. Mei identified the sources from which the forger had cut and pasted text, and even suggested Huangfu Mi as a probable culprit. In the 17th century, Yan Ruoqu's unpublished but widely distributed manuscript entitled Evidential analysis of the Old Script Documents (尚書古文疏證; Shàngshū gǔwén shūzhèng) convinced most scholars that the rediscovered Old Script texts were fabricated in the 3rd or 4th centuries.

=== Modern discoveries ===
New light has been shed on the Book of Documents by the recovery between 1993 and 2008 of caches of texts written on bamboo slips from tombs of the state of Chu in Jingmen, Hubei. These texts are believed to date from the late Warring States period, around 300 BC, and thus predate the burning of the books during the Qin dynasty. The Guodian Chu Slips and the Shanghai Museum corpus include quotations of previously unknown passages of the work. The Tsinghua Bamboo Slips includes a version of the transmitted text "Golden Coffer", with minor textual differences, as well as several documents in the same style that are not included in the received text. The collection also includes two documents that the editors considered to be versions of the Old Script texts "Common Possession of Pure Virtue" and "Command to Fu Yue". Other authors have challenged these straightforward identifications.

== Contents ==
In the orthodox arrangement, the work consists of 58 chapters, each with a brief preface traditionally attributed to Confucius, and also includes a preface and commentary, both purportedly by Kong Anguo. An alternative organization, first used by Wu Cheng, includes only the Modern Script chapters, with the chapter prefaces collected together, but omitting the Kong preface and commentary. In addition, several chapters are divided into two or three parts in the orthodox form.

=== Nature of the chapters ===
With the exception of a few chapters of late date, the chapters are represented as records of formal speeches by kings or other important figures. Most of these speeches are of one of five types, indicated by their titles:

- Consultations (謨 mó) between the king and his ministers (2 chapters),
- Instructions (訓 xùn) to the king from his ministers (1 chapter),
- Announcements (誥 gào) by the king to his people (8 chapters),
- Declarations (誓 shì) by a ruler on the occasion of a battle (6 chapters), and
- Commands (命 mìng) by the king to a specific vassal (7 chapters).

Classical Chinese tradition lists six types of Shu, beginning with dian 典, Canons (2 chapters in the Modern corpus).

According to Su Shi (1037–1101), it is possible to single out Eight Announcements of the early Zhou, directed to the Shang people. Their titles only partially correspond to the modern chapters marked as gao (apart from the nos. 13, 14, 15, 17, 18 that mention the genre, Su Shi names nos. 16 "Zi cai", 19 "Duo shi" and 22 "Duo fang").

As pointed out by Chen Mengjia (1911–1966), announcements and commands are similar, but differ in that commands usually include granting of valuable objects, land or servants to their recipients.

Guo Changbao 过常宝 claims that the graph for announcement (誥), known since the Oracle bone script, also appears on two bronze vessels (He zun and Shi Zhi gui 史[臣+舌]簋), as well as in the "six genres" 六辞 of the Zhou li

In many cases a speech is introduced with the phrase Wáng ruò yuē (王若曰 'The king seemingly said'), which also appears on commemorative bronze inscriptions from the Western Zhou period, but not in other received texts. Scholars interpret this as meaning that the original documents were prepared scripts of speeches, to be read out by an official on behalf of the king.

=== Traditional organization ===
The chapters are grouped into four sections representing different eras: the semi-mythical reign of Yu the Great, and the three ancient dynasties of the Xia, Shang and Zhou. The first two sections – on Yu the Great and the Xia dynasty – contain two chapters each in the Modern Script version, and though they purport to record the earliest material in the Documents, from the 2nd millennium BC, most scholars believe they were written during the Warring States period. The Shang dynasty section contains five chapters, of which the first two – the "Speech of King Tang" and "Pan Geng" – recount the conquest of the Xia by the Shang and their leadership's migration to a new capital (now identified as Anyang). The bulk of the Zhou dynasty section concerns the reign of King Cheng of Zhou (r. c. 1040–1006 BC) and the king's uncles, the Duke of Zhou and Duke of Shao. The last four Modern Script chapters relate to the later Western Zhou and early Spring and Autumn periods.

Chapters of the Book of Documents
Part	New Text	Orthodox chapter	Title		
虞書; Yu [Shun]	1	1	堯典	Yáo diǎn	Canon of Yao
虞書; Yu [Shun]	1	2	舜典	Shùn diǎn	Canon of Shun
虞書; Yu [Shun]		3	大禹謨	Dà Yǔ mó	Counsels of Great Yu
虞書; Yu [Shun]	2	4	皋陶謨	Gāo Yáo mó	Counsels of Gao Yao
虞書; Yu [Shun]	2	5	益稷	Yì jì	Yi and Ji
夏書; Xia	3	6	禹貢	Yǔ gòng	Tribute of [Great] Yu
夏書; Xia	4	7	甘誓	Gān shì	Speech at [the Battle of] Gan
夏書; Xia		8	五子之歌	Wǔ zǐ zhī gē	Songs of the Five Sons
夏書; Xia		9	胤征	Yìn zhēng	Punitive Expedition on [King Zhongkang of] Yin
商書; Shang	5	10	湯誓	Tāng shì	Speech of Tang
商書; Shang		11	仲虺之誥	Zhònghuī zhī gào	Announcement of Zhong Hui
商書; Shang		12	湯誥	Tāng gào	Announcement of Tang
商書; Shang		13	伊訓	Yī xùn	Instructions of Yi [Yin]
商書; Shang		14–16	太甲	Tài jiǎ	Great Oath parts 1, 2 & 3
商書; Shang		17	咸有一德	Xián yǒu yī dé	Common Possession of Pure Virtue
商書; Shang	6	18–20	盤庚	Pán Gēng	Pan Geng parts 1, 2 & 3
商書; Shang		21–23	說命	Yuè mìng	Charge to Yue parts 1, 2 & 3
商書; Shang	7	24	高宗肜日	Gāozōng róng rì	Day of the Supplementary Sacrifice of King Gaozong
商書; Shang	8	25	西伯戡黎	Xībó kān lí	Chief of the West [King Wen]'s Conquest of [the State of] Li
商書; Shang	9	26	微子	Wēizǐ	[Prince] Weizi
周書; Zhou		27–29	泰誓	Tài shì	Great Speech parts 1, 2 & 3
周書; Zhou	10	30	牧誓	Mù shì	Speech at Muye
周書; Zhou		31	武成	Wǔ chéng	Successful Completion of the War [on Shang]
周書; Zhou	11	32	洪範	Hóng fàn	Great Plan [of Jizi]
周書; Zhou		33	旅獒	Lǚ áo	Hounds of [the Western Tribesmen] Lü
周書; Zhou	12	34	金滕	Jīn téng	Golden Coffer [of Zhou Gong]
周書; Zhou	13	35	大誥	Dà gào	Great Announcement
周書; Zhou		36	微子之命	Wēizǐ zhī mìng	Charge to Prince Weizi
周書; Zhou	14	37	康誥	Kāng gào	Announcement to Kang
周書; Zhou	15	38	酒誥	Jiǔ gào	Announcement about Drunkenness
周書; Zhou	16	39	梓材	Zǐ cái	Timber of Rottlera
周書; Zhou	17	40	召誥	Shào gào	Announcement of Duke Shao
周書; Zhou	18	41	洛誥	Luò gào	Announcement concerning Luoyang
周書; Zhou	19	42	多士	Duō shì	Numerous Officers
周書; Zhou	20	43	無逸	Wú yì	Against Luxurious Ease
周書; Zhou	21	44	君奭	Jūn shì	Lord Shi [Duke Shao]
周書; Zhou		45	蔡仲之命	Cài Zhòng zhī mìng	Charge to Cai Zhong
周書; Zhou	22	46	多方	Duō fāng	Numerous Regions
周書; Zhou	23	47	立政	Lì zhèng	Establishment of Government
周書; Zhou		48	周官	Zhōu guān	Officers of Zhou
周書; Zhou		49	君陳	Jūn chén	Lord Chen
周書; Zhou	24	50	顧命	Gù mìng	Testamentary Charge
周書; Zhou	24	51	康王之誥	Kāng wáng zhī gào	Proclamation of King Kang
周書; Zhou		52	畢命	Bì mìng	Charge to the [Duke of] Bi
周書; Zhou		53	君牙	Jūn Yá	Lord Ya
周書; Zhou		54	冏命	Jiǒng mìng	Charge to Jiong
周書; Zhou	25	55	呂刑	Lǚ xíng	[Marquis] Lü on Punishments
周書; Zhou	26	56	文侯之命	Wén hóu zhī mìng	Charge to Duke Wen of Jin
周書; Zhou	27	57	費誓	Fèi shì	Speech at [the Battle of] Fei
周書; Zhou	28	58	秦誓	Qín shì	Speech of Duke Mu of Qin

== Dating of the Modern Script chapters ==
Not all of the Modern Script chapters are believed to be contemporaneous with the events they describe, which range from the legendary emperors Yao and Shun to early in the Spring and Autumn period. Six of these chapters concern figures prior to the first evidence of writing, the oracle bones dating from the reign of the Late Shang king Wu Ding. Moreover, the chapters dealing with the earliest periods are the closest in language and focus to classical works of the Warring States period.

The five announcements in the Documents of Zhou feature the most archaic language, closely resembling inscriptions found on Western Zhou bronzes in both grammar and vocabulary. They are considered by most scholars to record speeches of King Cheng of Zhou, as well as the Duke of Zhou and Duke of Shao, uncles of King Cheng who were key figures during his reign (late 11th century BC). They provide insight into the politics and ideology of the period, including the doctrine of the Mandate of Heaven, explaining how the once-virtuous Xia had become corrupt and were replaced by the virtuous Shang, who went through a similar cycle ending in their replacement by the Zhou. The "Timber of Rottlera", "Numerous Officers", "Against Luxurious Ease" and "Numerous Regions" chapters are believed to have been written somewhat later, in the late Western Zhou period. A minority of scholars, pointing to differences in language between the announcements and Zhou bronzes, argue that all of these chapters are products of a commemorative tradition in the late Western Zhou or early Spring and Autumn periods.

Chapters dealing with the late Shang and the transition to Zhou use less archaic language. They are believed to have been modelled on the earlier speeches by writers in the Spring and Autumn period, a time of renewed interest in politics and dynastic decline. The later chapters of the Zhou section are also believed to have been written around this time. The "Gaozong Rongri" chapter comprises only 82 characters, and its interpretation was already disputed in Western Han commentaries. Pointing to the similarity of its title to formulas found in the Anyang oracle bone inscriptions, David Nivison proposed that the chapter was written or recorded by a collateral descendant of Wu Ding in the late Shang period some time after 1140 BC.

The "Pan Geng" chapter (later divided into three parts) seems to be intermediate in style between this group and the next. It is the longest speech in the Documents, and is unusual in its extensive use of analogy. Scholars since the Tang dynasty have noted the difficult language of the "Pan Geng" and the Zhou Announcement chapters. (Note: Han Yu used the idiom 佶屈聱牙 (roughly meaning 'unflowing' and 'difficult to say') to describe the Zhou 'Announcements' and the Yin (Shang) 'Pan Geng'.) Citing the archaic language and worldview, Chinese scholars have argued for a Shang dynasty provenance for the "Pan Geng" chapters, with considerable editing and replacement of the vocabulary by Zhou dynasty authors accounting for the difference in language from Shang inscriptions.

The chapters dealing with the legendary emperors, the Xia dynasty and the transition to Shang are very similar in language to such classics as the Mencius (late 4th century BC). They present idealized rulers, with the earlier political concerns subordinate to moral and cosmological theory, and are believed to be the products of philosophical schools of the late Warring States period. Some chapters, particularly the "Tribute of Yu", may be as late as the Qin dynasty.

== Influence in the West ==
When Jesuit scholars prepared the first translations of Chinese Classics into Latin, they called the Documents the "Book of Kings", making a parallel with the Books of Kings in the Old Testament. They saw Shang Di as the equivalent of the Christian God, and used passages from the Documents in their commentaries on other works.

== Notable translations ==
- Gaubil, Antoine (1770). Le Chou-king, un des livres sacrés des Chinois, qui renferme les fondements de leur ancienne histoire, les principes de leur gouvernement & de leur morale; ouvrage recueilli par Confucius [The Shūjīng, one of the Sacred Books of the Chinese, which contains the Foundations of their Ancient History, the Principles of their Government and their Morality; Material collected by Confucius] (in French). Paris: N. M. Tillard.
- Medhurst, W. H. (1846). Ancient China. The Shoo King or the Historical Classic. Shanghai: The Mission Press.
- Legge, James (1865). The Chinese Classics, volume III: the Shoo King or the Book of Historical Documents. London: Trubner.; rpt. Hong Kong: Hong Kong University Press, 1960. (Full Chinese text with English translation using Legge's own romanization system, with extensive background and annotations.)
  - part 1: Prolegomena and chapters 1–26 (up to books of Shang)
  - part 2: chapters 27–58 (books of Zhou), indexes
- Legge, James (1879). The Shû king; The religious portions of the Shih king; The Hsiâo king. Sacred Books of the East. Vol. 3. Oxford: Clarendon Press. Includes a minor revision of Legge's translation.
- Couvreur, Séraphin (1897). Chou King, Les Annales de la Chine [Shujing, the Annals of China] (in French). Hokkien: Mission Catholique. Archived from the original on 2011-04-17. Reprinted (1999), Paris: You Feng.
- Karlgren, Bernhard (1950). "The Book of Documents". Bulletin of the Museum of Far Eastern Antiquities. 22: 1–81. (Modern Script chapters only) Reprinted as a separate volume by Elanders in 1950.
- Katō, Jōken 加藤常賢 (1964). Shin kobun Shōsho shūshaku 真古文尚書集釈 [Authentic 'Old Text' Shàngshū, with Collected Commentary] (in Japanese). Tokyo: Meiji shoin.
- (in Mandarin Chinese) Qu, Wanli 屈萬里 (1969). Shàngshū jīnzhù jīnyì 尚書今注今譯 [The Book of Documents, with Modern Annotations and Translation]. Taipei: Taiwan shangwu yinshuguan.
- Waltham, Clae (1971). Shu ching: Book of History. A Modernized Edition of the Translation of James Legge. Chicago: Henry Regnery.
- Ikeda, Suitoshi 池田末利 (1976). Shōsho 尚書 [Shàngshū] (in Japanese). Tokyo: Shūeisha.
- Palmer, Martin; Ramsay, Jay; Finlay, Victoria (2014). The Most Venerable Book (Shang Shu) also known as the Shu Jing (The Classic of Chronicles). London: Penguin Books.

== See also ==
- Glossary of Shangshu exegesis
