= Old Text School =

School of thought in Confucianism

Old Text School (Chinese: 古文經; pinyin: Gǔwén Jīng; Wade–Giles: Kuwen Ching) of Confucianism emphasized a historical reading of the Chinese classics. When the Five Classics were discovered during the Han dynasty, it was written in a script that predated the one in use and produced before the burning of the books movement. The term "Old Text" became used in contrast with "New Text School" (今文經), which indicated a group of texts written in the orthography currently in use during the Han dynasty.

Historical sources record the recovery of a group of texts during the last half of the 2nd century BC from the walls of Confucius’s old residence in Qufu, the old capital of the State of Lu, when Prince Liu Yu (d. 127 BC) attempted to expand it into a palace upon taking the throne there. In the course of taking the old wall apart, the restorers found versions of the Classic of History, Rites of Zhou, Yili, Analects of Confucius and Classic of Filial Piety, all written in the old orthography used prior to the reforms of the clerical script. Hence, they were called "Old Text" works.

== Terminology ==
New Text works
Confucian classics that were reconstructed from surviving copies and scraps. The Gongyang Zhuan and Guliang Zhuan commentaries and the Classic of Rites are among these.
Old Text works
These alternate versions of the classics were found after the New Text classics were compiled. Some came from the Confucian family manor while others were found in the imperial archives or in private collections. The Rites of Zhou and the Zuo Zhuan commentary are Old Text works.
Forged works in Old Text
This concerns primarily the rediscovered version of Book of Documents. During the Jin dynasty, Mei Ze, a minor official pretended to have discovered a preface by Kong Anguo and 18 texts (divided into 25 sections) that were known to have existed during the Han dynasty written in Ancient Script, but had long been lost. Suspicions emerged during the Song dynasty but it was not proven until Yan Ruoju circulated his thesis in the Qing dynasty. Recent archaeological recoveries of manuscripts produced around 350 BCE confirmed the late nature of these 18 texts. Huangfu Mi, Wang Su, or Mei Ze himself are suspected as the forgers.
Received Text works
This term indicates any texts that have been transmitted, overall continuously, from ancient times to the present. This group includes the I Ching and Classic of Poetry, the New Text version of the Yili, a combined version of the Analects, and the New Text version of History with the 25 forged chapters.

== Controversy among new schools ==
By the 1st century, a new controversy had begun between these two texts. The "New Text" works are those that had been transliterated into the new orthography back in the beginning of 2nd century BC, either from oral transmissions or from texts that had survived the Qin dynasty's burning of the books or were rescued by the Han dynasty in the provinces. Surviving scholars in the direct line of transmission of these texts got hold of surviving copies and transliterated them into the new orthography.

The "Old Text" works were the ones that off and on since the late 2nd and during the 1st century BC had turned up, some discovered in the walls of Confucius's residence, or in Warring States period graves. They were called the "Old Text" works because they were written in the pre-Qin writing. The discoverers of the "Old Text" works, such as Liu Xin, claimed that all existing texts suffered from an interrupted pedigree, which was rectified by the newly discovered texts. "New Text" supporters claimed that the "Old Text" works are forgeries that lack a line of transmission.

In reality, the burning of the books probably did little more than symbolically burn a few copies of the Confucian books conveniently at hand in the capital. Many other copies survived elsewhere, and these were available for copying into the new orthographic standard set by Qin and its clerical script successor which evolved under Han dynasty. It was the change in orthography which divided the Warring States and early imperial period textual traditions, and in this respect the newly discovered texts were no different from those used as the basis for the "New Text" transcriptions soon after the fall of Qin dynasty.

The "New Text" works portray Confucius as a prophet or "uncrowned king" that should have received the Mandate of Heaven. He could perform miracles and wrote the Five Classics himself. The New Text school, founded by Dong Zhongshu, believed the texts were sacred and carried hidden clues to the future that they tried to decode. They were also interested in apocryphal writings that were abstruse and esoteric. They believed historical events were caused by cosmic forces beyond the control of man. They also believed officials should disobey the sovereign's decree if it will harm the state or dynasty. To betray the sovereign for the sovereign's own sake will keep the Mandate of Heaven in the dynasty's hand and is an act of greater loyalty.

The Old Text School was rationalistic. They rejected apocrypha and believed that the classics were only edited by Confucius. They believed history was caused by human actions and viewed the Son of Heaven (the emperor of China) as the axis mundi whose will was absolute. Officials may advise but not disobey as it is the emperor who is ultimately responsible for keeping or losing the Mandate of Heaven.

The Old Text works had a peculiarly archaist bent. They emphasized the sage-like as opposed to the prophet-like characteristics of Confucius, thereby making him look more like the earlier sages who founded and ruled the Zhou dynasty or even the still more archaic states which preceded it. And yet, these archaic sage-kings are shown ruling China with a bureaucratic apparatus peculiarly like that available to Han dynasty rulers, and hence by methods which strikingly echoed those of putative enemies of Wang Mang, the modernists. The Former Han (206 BC – AD 8), prior to Wang Mang, had favored the New Text work. When Wang seized power, he declared the Old Text works to be the state orthodoxy. After the Han restoration, the New Text works became orthodox again.

Later Han (AD 25–220) scholars began favoring the Old Text works. Zheng Xuan synthesized the teachings of both schools. While he was very influential, he was unable to unseat the New Text orthodoxy though the issue became moot when both schools disappeared after the collapse of the Han. The Old Text School was promoted under Wang Mang and remained influential from the Later Han to modern times. Zheng became the mainstream source of interpretation until the appearance of Neo-Confucianism in the Tang and Song dynasties. The controversy was forgotten until it was rediscovered during the Qing dynasty by scholars of Han learning.

== Modern interpretations ==
Significance of the Old and New Text controversy is a debate topic in the modern sinology. Michael Nylan has argued that the issue itself was an artificial projection of the mid-Han problematic onto the early Han realities.

== See also ==
- Chinese classic texts
- Guwen
- New Text School

== Sources ==
- Aque, Stuart V. (1994). "Introduction". Pi Xirui and Jingxue lishi (PhD thesis). University of Washington. hdl:1773/11124.
- Nylan, Michael (1994). "The Chin wen/Ku wen Controversy in Han Times". T'oung Pao. 80 (1). Brill: 83–145. doi:10.1163/156853294X00070. JSTOR 4528622. A thorough and detailed study of the jinwen/guwen designation, distinction, and related topics.
- Ess, Hans Van (1994). "The Old Text/New Text Controversy. Has the 20th Century Got It Wrong?". T'oung Pao. 80 (1). Brill: 146–170. doi:10.1163/156853294X00098. JSTOR 4528623. A study that addresses the views of modern scholars.
