= Mei Ze =

- Other name: Mei Yi

Academic background
- Influences: Fu Sheng; Kong Anguo

Academic work
- Era: Ancient philosophy
- Discipline: Chinese philosophy
- School or tradition: Confucianism
- Main interests: Shangshu
- Notable works: Old Text Shangshu (received)
- Influenced: Kong Yingda

Mei Ze (Chinese: 梅賾; Wade–Giles: Mei Tse; fl. 4th century), also known as Mei Yi (梅頤), was a Confucian scholar and government official of the Eastern Jin dynasty of ancient China. A native of Runan (汝南, present-day Wuchang District, Hubei province), Mei Ze served as governor of Yuzhang Commandery (豫章, present-day Nanchang, Jiangxi province). After the establishment of the Eastern Jin, he presented a purported copy of Kong Anguo's lost compilation of the Old Text Shangshu (Book of Documents) to the emperor, which became officially recognized as a Confucian classic for over a millennium. However, Mei Ze's version of the Shangshu has been proven a forgery.

== Background ==
The Shangshu, a collection of documents written in the Zhou dynasty, is one of the Five Classics of Confucianism. Most copies of the book were destroyed in 213 BC, when the First Emperor of Qin ordered a large-scale burning of books. The scholar Fu Sheng hid a copy in the wall and later recovered 29 chapters of it, which is known as the "New Text" Shangshu. During the early Western Han dynasty, another copy was accidentally discovered hidden in the walls of the mansion of Confucius, which contained 16 more chapters than Fu Sheng's version. Scholar Kong Anguo compiled and wrote a commentary of the document, and presented it to the emperor. This version is called the "Old Text" Shangshu, which was however lost during the Eastern Han dynasty (25–220 AD).

== "Rediscovery" of the Old Text Shangshu ==
After the Yongjia Disturbance ended the Western Jin dynasty in 311 AD, the Jin court fled southeast to Jiankang. Emperor Yuan, the first emperor of Eastern Jin, asked the public to submit books to the court in order to replenish the imperial library which had been destroyed in the war. Mei Ze presented a "rediscovered" copy of Kong Anguo's Old Text Shangshu to the emperor, along with a preface purportedly written by Kong. Explaining the discovery, Mei Ze claimed that he acquired the documents from a certain Zang Cao (臧曹), who had previously obtained them from Liang Liu (梁柳), a cousin of the famous physician-scholar Huangfu Mi, and that he had salvaged the text from destruction in the warfare that ended the Western Jin. Zang Cao and Liang Liu had both been dead by the time Mei Ze presented the scripture to the emperor. The Jin court accepted Mei's version as authentic, and it became widely disseminated throughout the empire.

Mei Ze's version of the Shangshu includes Fu Sheng's New Text, which was redivided into 33 chapters, along with 25 extra chapters purportedly from Kong Anguo's lost Old Text, for a total of 58 chapters.

== Legacy ==
Mei Ze's Old Text Shangshu became highly influential. In the seventh century, during the early Tang dynasty, scholar Kong Yingda oversaw the imperial Correct Meanings of the Five Classics (五經正義) project, and Mei Ze's Old Text became the official version of the Confucian classic. The Shangshu Zhengyi, likely authored by Kong, provided the official interpretation of the text. Although many scholars had questioned the authenticity of Mei's version over the centuries, it maintained its official status and was the most influential version of the Shangshu for more than 1,000 years until the Qing dynasty, when the 17th-century scholar Yan Ruoqu devoted much of his lifetime to the study of the Shangshu and conclusively proved that Mei Ze's version was a forgery. Analyses of the recently discovered Tsinghua Bamboo Slips have further bolstered Yan's now widely accepted conclusion.
