= Guwen =

Gǔwén or Ku-wen (古文 "ancient writing") may refer to:

- one of the two additional forms included in the Shuowen Jiezi, an ancient Chinese dictionary
- Chinese characters, ancient forms
  - Chinese bronze inscriptions
  - Oracle bone script
  - Seal script
- Old Texts, versions of Chinese classics held to have been transcribed from recovered manuscripts
- Classical Chinese, the language of the classic literature of ancient China
  - Classical Chinese grammar
- Classical Prose Movement of the Tang and Song dynasties in China
- Guwen Guanzhi, an anthology of essays written in literary Chinese
