= Fu Sheng (scholar) =

Confucian scholar

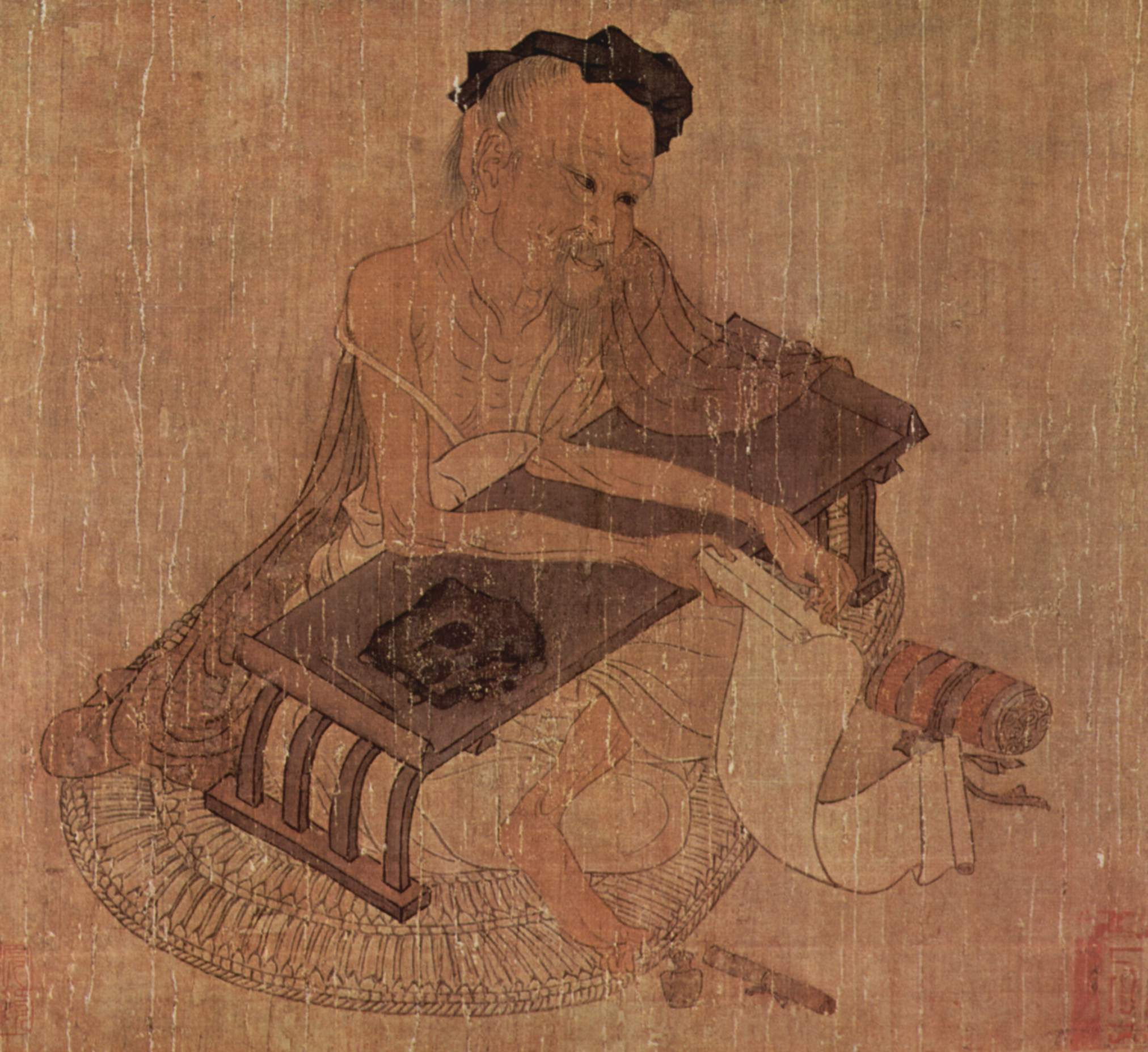
- Portrait of Fu Sheng by Tang painter Wang Wei
- Born: 3rd century BC; Zouping or Zhangqiu
- Died: 2nd century BC

Academic work
- School or tradition: Confucianism
- Main interests: Shangshu
- Notable works: Shangshu (new text); Shangshu Dazhuan

Fu Sheng (Chinese: 伏勝; 268–178 BC), also known as Master Fu (伏生), was a Chinese philosopher and writer. He was a Confucian scholar of the Qin and Western Han dynasties of ancient China, famous for saving the Confucian classic Shangshu (Book of Documents) from the book burning of the First Emperor of Qin. Fu Sheng is depicted in the Wu Shuang Pu (無雙譜, Table of Peerless Heroes) by Jin Guliang.

== Biography ==
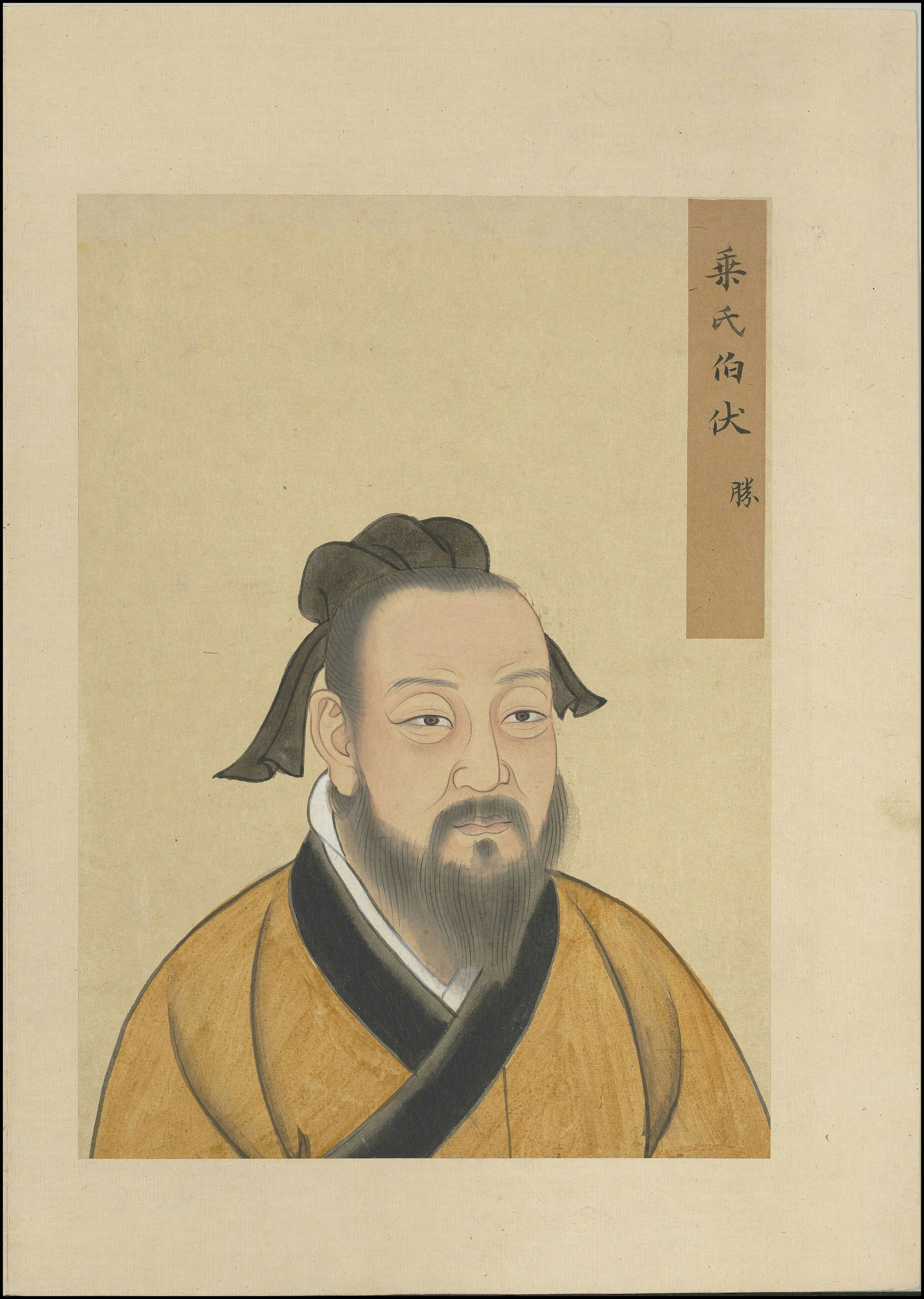
Yuan dynasty portrait.

Fu Sheng was a native of Jinan prefecture (濟南, in present-day Zouping or Zhangqiu, Shandong province), and was said to be a descendant of the legendary ancient ruler Fu Xi. He was a boshi (博士, "erudite") of the Qin dynasty. In 213 BC the First Emperor of Qin ordered the Burning of Books and killed many Confucian scholars. Risking his life, Fu Sheng hid a copy of the book in the walls of his house. He later escaped his hometown in the warfare that soon broke out and eventually ended the Qin dynasty. After the Han dynasty was established in 206 BC, Fu Sheng returned home and retrieved the scrolls. However, he was only able to recover 29 chapters; the rest (tens of chapters) had been lost to damage or decay. (Some scholars believe that Fu Sheng memorized the chapters instead of recovering them from the walls.)

According to Sima Qian's Records of the Grand Historian, when Emperor Wen of Han (r. 180–157 BC) searched the country for copies of the Shangshu, Fu Sheng was the only person who could produce one. As Fu was already over 90 years old and unable to travel, Emperor Wen dispatched the official Chao Cuo to study the Shangshu from him. Fu's daughter or granddaughter had to interpret the old man's words for the official. "The daughter’s role was crucial because Fu Sheng spoke only the dialect of the ancient state of Qi, an idiom incomprehensible to the official charged with transcribing the text." Fu's other disciples, surnamed Ouyang and Zhang, also became masters of Shangshu. Master Ouyang's great-grandson Ouyang Gao (歐陽高) would later found one of the three main schools for the study of Shangshu. Kong Anguo, the scholar who later compiled the "old text" Shangshu, also studied with him.

The commentary Shangshu Dazhuan (尚書大傳, Amplification of the Shangshu) is traditionally attributed to Fu Sheng, but much of the work was probably done by his disciples Ouyang Sheng and Zhang Sheng (both fl. 180–157 BC), or even later scholars.

== Legacy ==
Along with Dong Zhongshu, Fu Sheng is recognized as one of the most important Confucianists of the Han dynasty. He is often venerated in Confucian temples along with other sages, and has been the subject of many poems, essays, and paintings. Tang dynasty poet-painter Wang Wei's portrait of him is now in the collection of the Osaka City Museum of Fine Arts in Japan, and another portrait by the Ming dynasty painter Cui Zizhong is in the Shanghai Museum.

Fu Sheng's family remained prominent throughout the Han dynasty. His descendant Fu Shou married Emperor Xian, the last emperor of Han.

Fu Sheng's offspring held the title of Wujing Boshi (五經博士; Wǔjīng Bóshì).

Fu's tomb is still extant in Zouping County, Shandong province. Its remains measure 45 meters in diameter and 2 meters in height. In Zouping there also used to be a Fu Sheng Temple, a Fu Sheng Academy, and a Fu Sheng Township.
