= Zheng Xuan =

Chinese philosopher, politician and writer (127–200)

- Traditional Chinese: 鄭玄
- Simplified Chinese: 郑玄
Transcriptions
Standard Mandarin
- Hanyu Pinyin: Zhèng Xuán
- Wade–Giles: Cheng^{4} Hsüan^{2}
- IPA: [ʈʂə̂ŋ ɕɥɛ̌n]
Yue: Cantonese
- Yale Romanization: Jehng Yùhn
- Jyutping: Zeng^{6} Jyun^{4}
- IPA: [tsɛŋ˨ jyn˩]
Southern Min
- Tâi-lô: Tēnn Hiân

Zheng Xuan 鄭玄
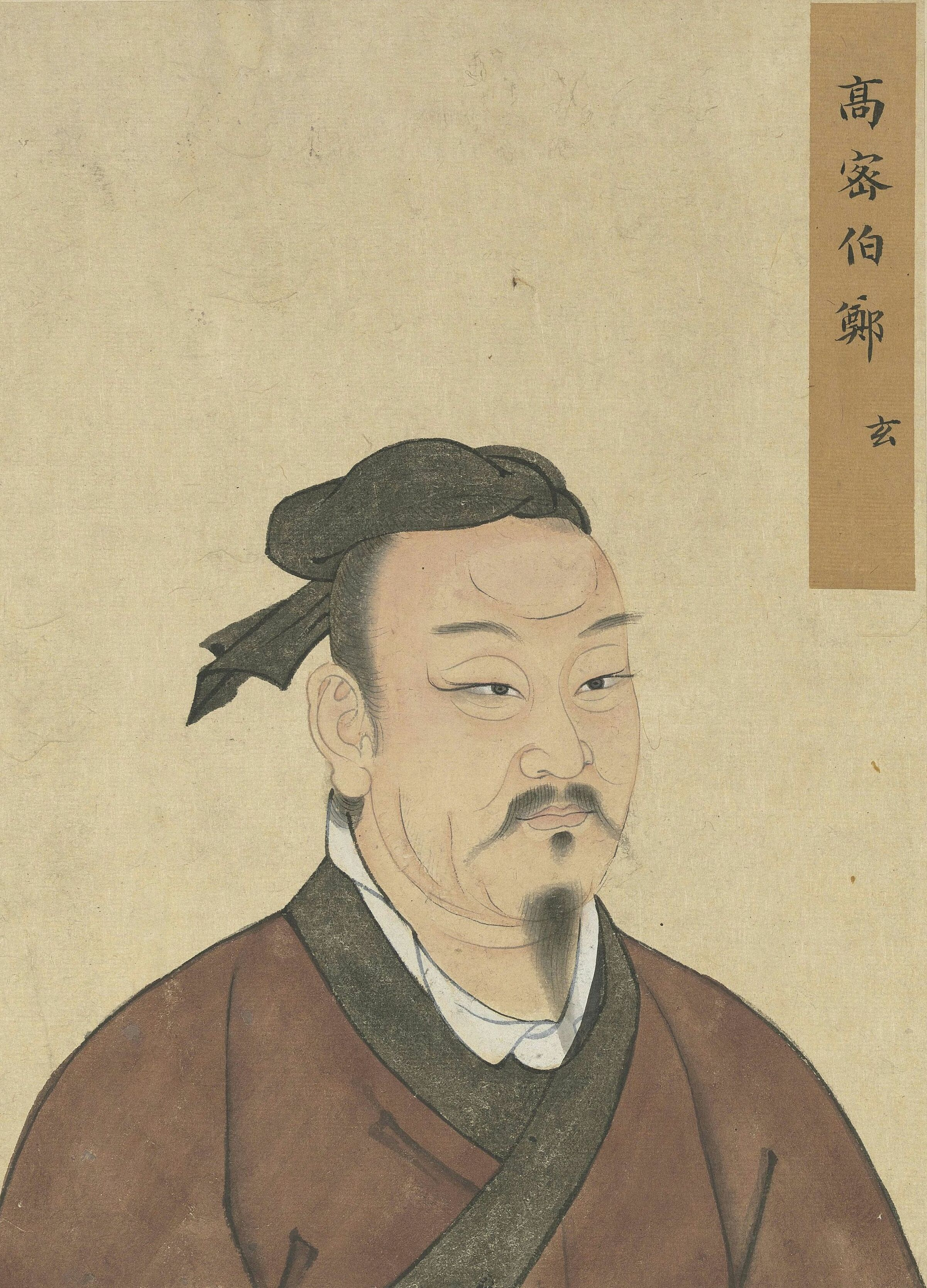
- Yuan dynasty portrait
- Born: 29 August 127; Gaomi, Beihai Commandery (modern Weifang, Shandong)
- Died: c.July 200
- Occupation: Philosopher

Philosophical work
- School: Confucianism
- Main interests: Ancient Script Texts; Classic of Poetry

Zheng Xuan (29 August 127– c.July 200), courtesy name Kangcheng (Chinese: 康成), was a Chinese philosopher, politician, and writer who lived towards the end of the Eastern Han dynasty. He was born in Gaomi, Beihai Commandery (modern Weifang, Shandong), and was a student of Ma Rong, together with Lu Zhi.

== Biography ==
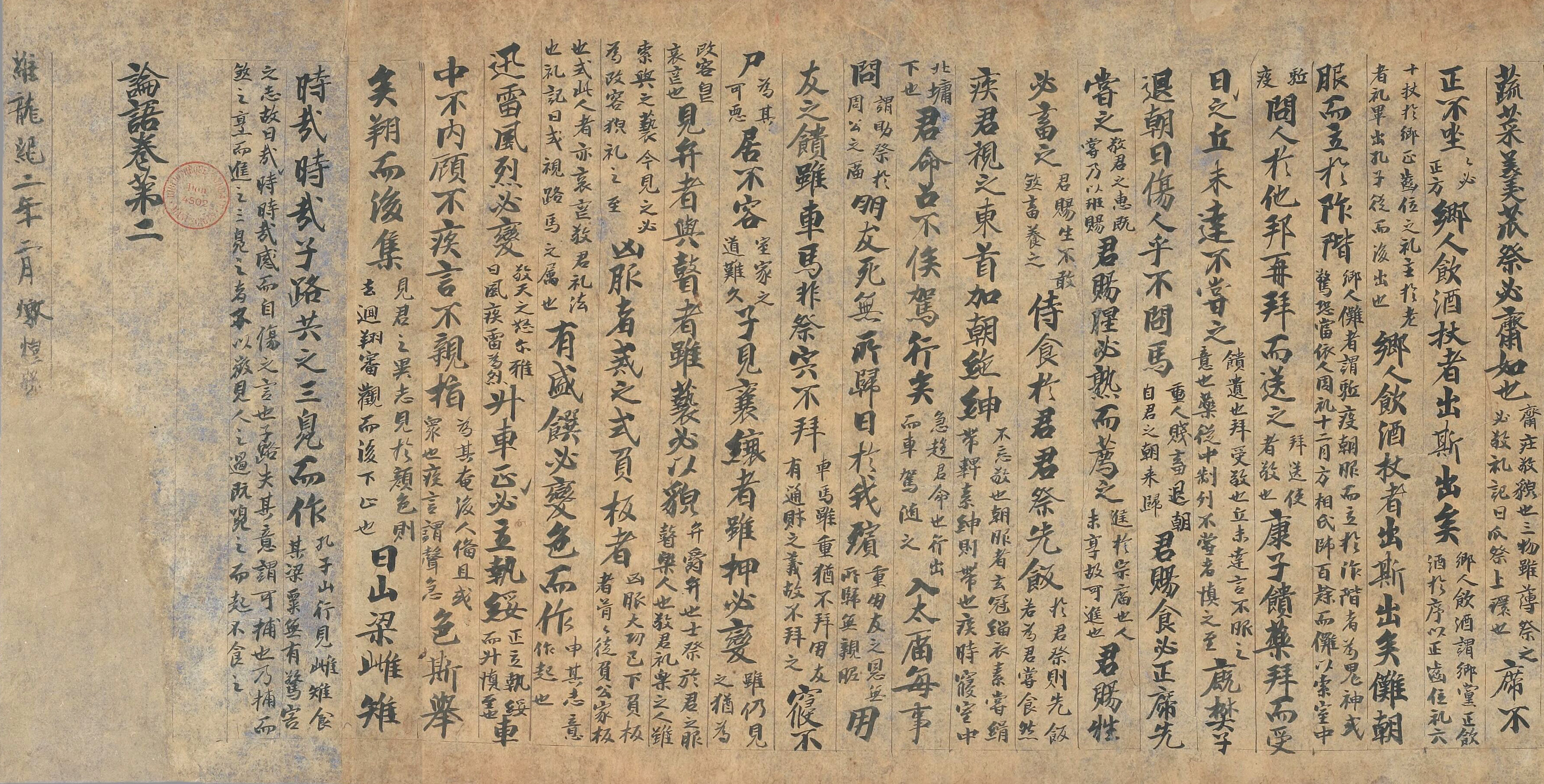
Fragment from the manuscript of Lunyu, a text by Kong Anguo with commentary by Zheng Xuan. This fragmentary manuscript was found at the Mogao Caves. It is dated to the era Longji, 2nd year (i.e. 890 CE), but it could have been copied in the middle of the 8th century. Bibliothèque nationale de France

Like his teacher, Ma Rong, Zheng Xuan was a member of the Old Text School, which challenged the state orthodox New Text School. His contemporary rival was He Xiu (Chinese: 何休, 129–182). Zheng is notable for his syncretic attempt to bridge the two centuries of rivalry between the two schools. He adopted the strengths of each school in interpreting the Confucian classics, although he usually favoured the Old Text teachings. He was very influential, but the government never officially adopted his teachings. The Han dynasty was already in decline during his lifetime and collapsed a decade after his death. Neither school survived the chaos, but Zheng's conception of Confucianism would be the mainstream interpretation for centuries.

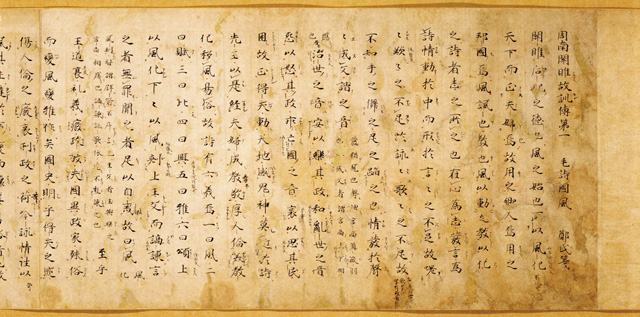
Japanese kanbun edition of Zheng Xuan's annotation to the Classic of Poetry, pre-1185.

Zheng Xuan notably produced an annotation of the Classic of Poetry, building on the work of Mao Heng's Mao Shi, which would go on to be presented together in parallel together. Their collective work, while significant, would eventually become confused over time, which resulted in academics such as Kong Yingda making considerable effort to separate the two again. Zheng Xuan's work remains important in interpretation of the Classic of Poetry to this day.

In 200, during the Battle of Guandu, the warlord Yuan Shao ordered Zheng to Yuan's stronghold (in modern-day Daming County, Hebei Province), where he died of illness in around July of that year.

== Legacy ==
A commemorative shrine of Zheng Xuan in Shandong was rebuilt under the supervision of Ruan Yuan (阮元; 1764–1849) in 1793.

== In Romance of the Three Kingdoms ==
Zheng Xuan appears in Chapter 22 of the novel Romance of the Three Kingdoms, which dramatises the end of the Han dynasty and the subsequent Three Kingdoms era. Zheng is depicted as living in Xuzhou. Liu Bei asks Zheng to write to Yuan Shao to propose an alliance against the warlord Cao Cao.

== See also ==
- Three Kingdoms
- Lists of people of the Three Kingdoms
- Records of the Three Kingdoms
- Romance of the Three Kingdoms
