= Jialiang =

Chinese imperial measuring device

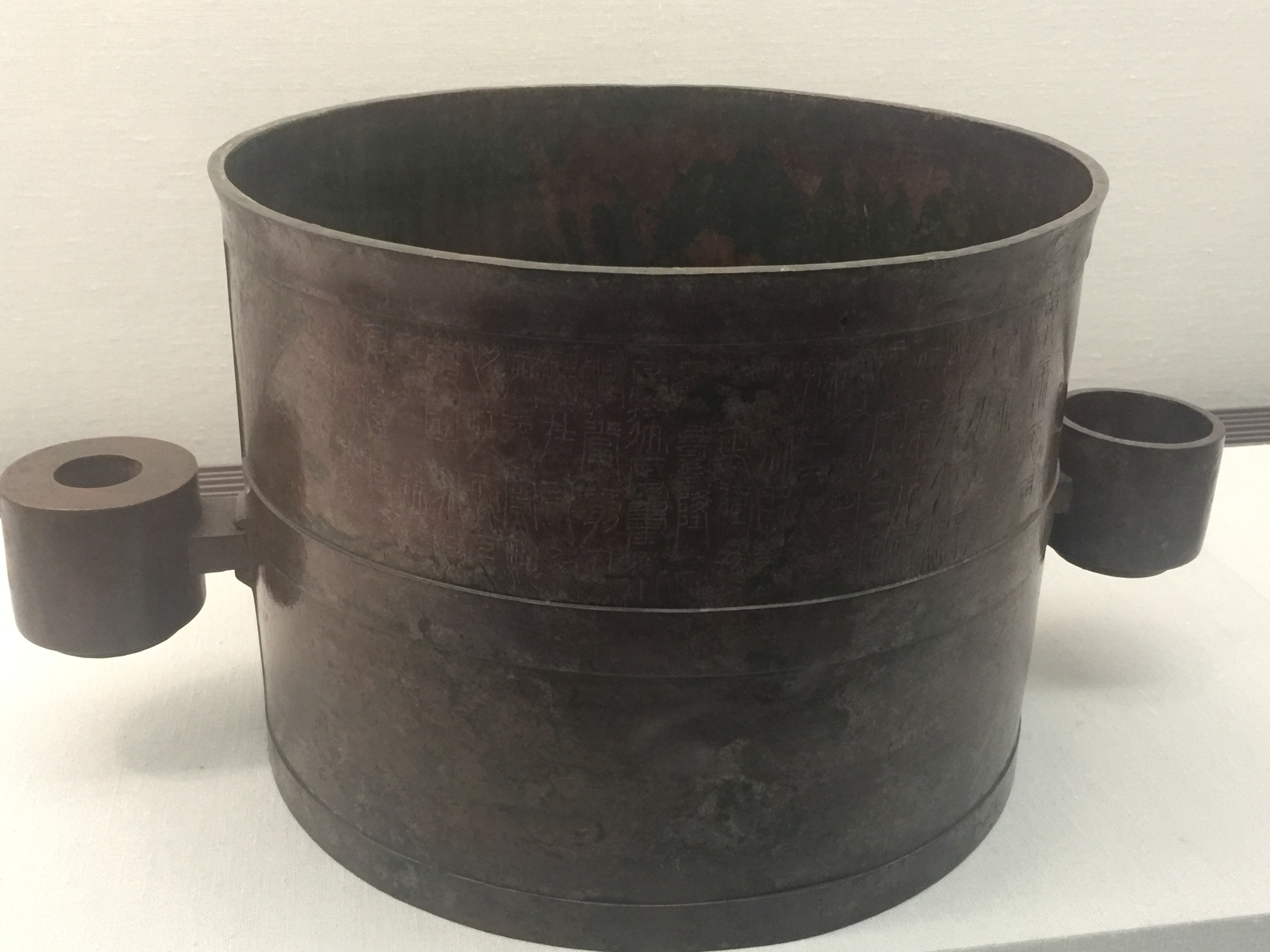
Wang Mang's jialiang is now in the National Palace Museum, Taipei.

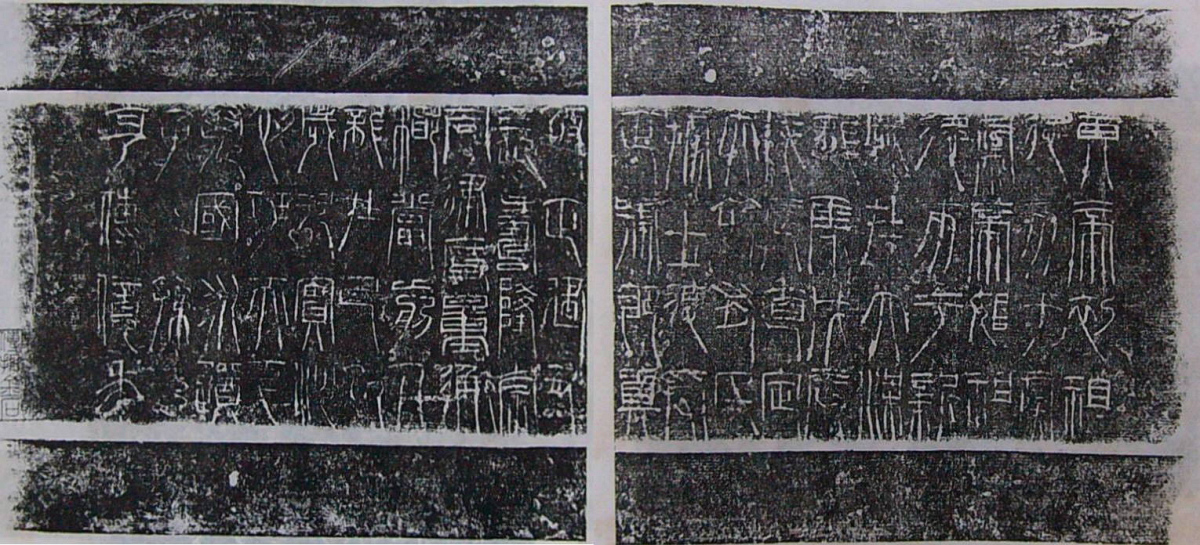
Inscription

Jialiang (Chinese: 嘉量; pinyin: Jiā liàng; Wade–Giles: chia¹-liang⁴; lit. 'auspicious measure') is an ancient Chinese device for measuring several volume standards.

The term jialiang is mentioned in the Rites of Zhou. The passage describes the construction of one that includes three measures, fu (釜), dou (豆), and sheng (升); furthermore, the instrument weighs one jun (鈞) and its sound is the gong of huangzhong (黃鐘之宮). Known jialiang give standards for the five measures yue (龠), ge (合, equal to two yue), sheng (升, equal to ten he), dou (斗, equal to ten sheng), and hu (斛, equal to ten dou).

The earliest known jialiang was made in the first year of Wang Mang's short-lived Xin dynasty (9–23 CE), in order to standardize the measurements across the empire. Wang chose bronze to emphasize that it would last and remain as a reference. A 216-character inscription records the process of the casting and shows where each of the five measurements can be found. Wang Mang's jialiang is now in the National Palace Museum, Taipei.

The continuing availability of Wang Mang's device has ensured it an important place in researching historical Chinese metrology for millennia. Investigations on the jialiang were undertaken by such scholars as Liu Hui of the Three Kingdoms period and Zu Chongzhi and Li Chunfeng of the Tang dynasty. According to the research of modern scholar Liu Fu 劉復, at the time of its creation, following its measurements, the standard units correspond to the modern metric system in this way: 1 chi (尺) was 23.1 cm; 1 sheng (升) was 200 mL; and 1 jin (斤) was 226.7 g.

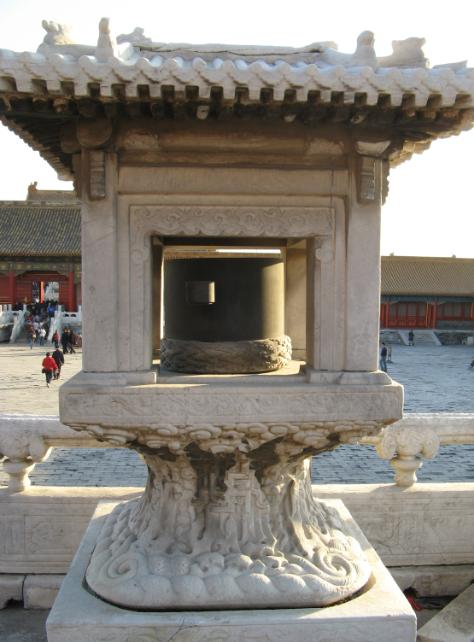
Jialiang at the Forbidden City, Beijing.

In Beijing's Forbidden City, before the Hall of Supreme Harmony and the Palace of Heavenly Purity, there are two jialiangs cast during the reign of the Qianlong Emperor, a square one in front of the Hall of Supreme Harmony and a round one in front of the Palace of Heavenly Purity. These were cast in 1745 based on an examination of the Wang Mang's round jialiang and the square jialiang made during the time of Emperor Taizong of Tang.

The jialiang and the adjacent sundial (rigui 日晷) have been described as symbolizing the sovereignty and unity of the imperial reign or emphasizing that the emperor is just and fair.
