= Ma Rong =

Chinese poet and politician (79-166)

- Traditional Chinese: 馬融
- Simplified Chinese: 马融
Transcriptions
Standard Mandarin
- Hanyu Pinyin: Mǎ Róng
- Wade–Giles: Ma^{3} Jung^{2}
- IPA: [mà ɻʊ̌ŋ]
Yue: Cantonese
- Yale Romanization: Máah Yùhng
Southern Min
- Tâi-lô: Má Iông

Ma Rong (Chinese: 馬融; 79–166), courtesy name Jichang (季長), was a Chinese essayist, poet, and politician of the Eastern Han dynasty. He was born in Youfufeng (右扶風) in the former Han capital region, in modern Xianyang, Shaanxi Province. His father Ma Yan (馬嚴) was a son of Ma Yu (馬余), an elder brother of the famed general Ma Yuan. He was known for his commentaries on the Five Classics, the first scholar known to have written commentaries on them, and he also developed the double column commentary for his project. His notable students were Lu Zhi and Zheng Xuan.

He was suspended for ten years due to critical comments, but was eventually restored to the Governor of Nan Commandery (modern Hubei). His biography appears in the Book of Later Han (volume 60, part 1). He wrote the Rhapsody on Long Flute (長笛賦); the Song dynasty Classic of Loyalty (忠經), patterned after the Classic of Filial Piety, bears attribution to his name.

His daughter Ma Lun (122 - 184) later married Yuan Wei, an uncle of Yuan Shao and Yuan Shu. Ma Lun also had a younger sister, Ma Zhi.
