= Kong Anguo =

1st-century BC Chinese politician and philosopher

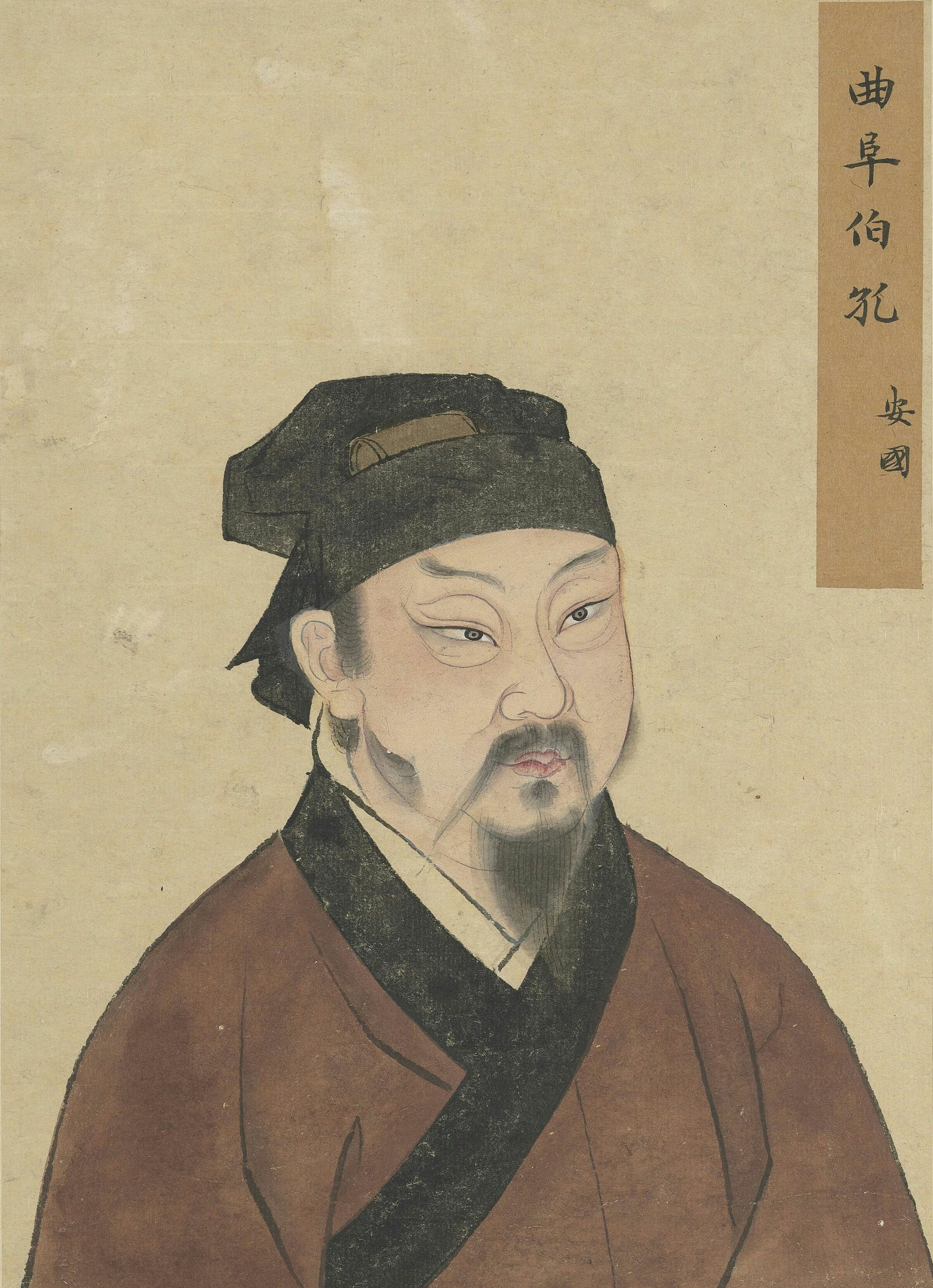
- Yuan dynasty portrait.
- Born: ca. 156 BC
- Died: ca. 74 BC
- Other name: Kong Ziguo
- Occupations: Classicist, philosopher, politician

Academic background
- Influences: Fu Sheng; Shen Pei

Academic work
- Era: Ancient philosophy
- School or tradition: Confucianism
- Main interests: Shangshu
- Notable works: Shangshu Kongshi Zhuan
- Influenced: Sima Qian

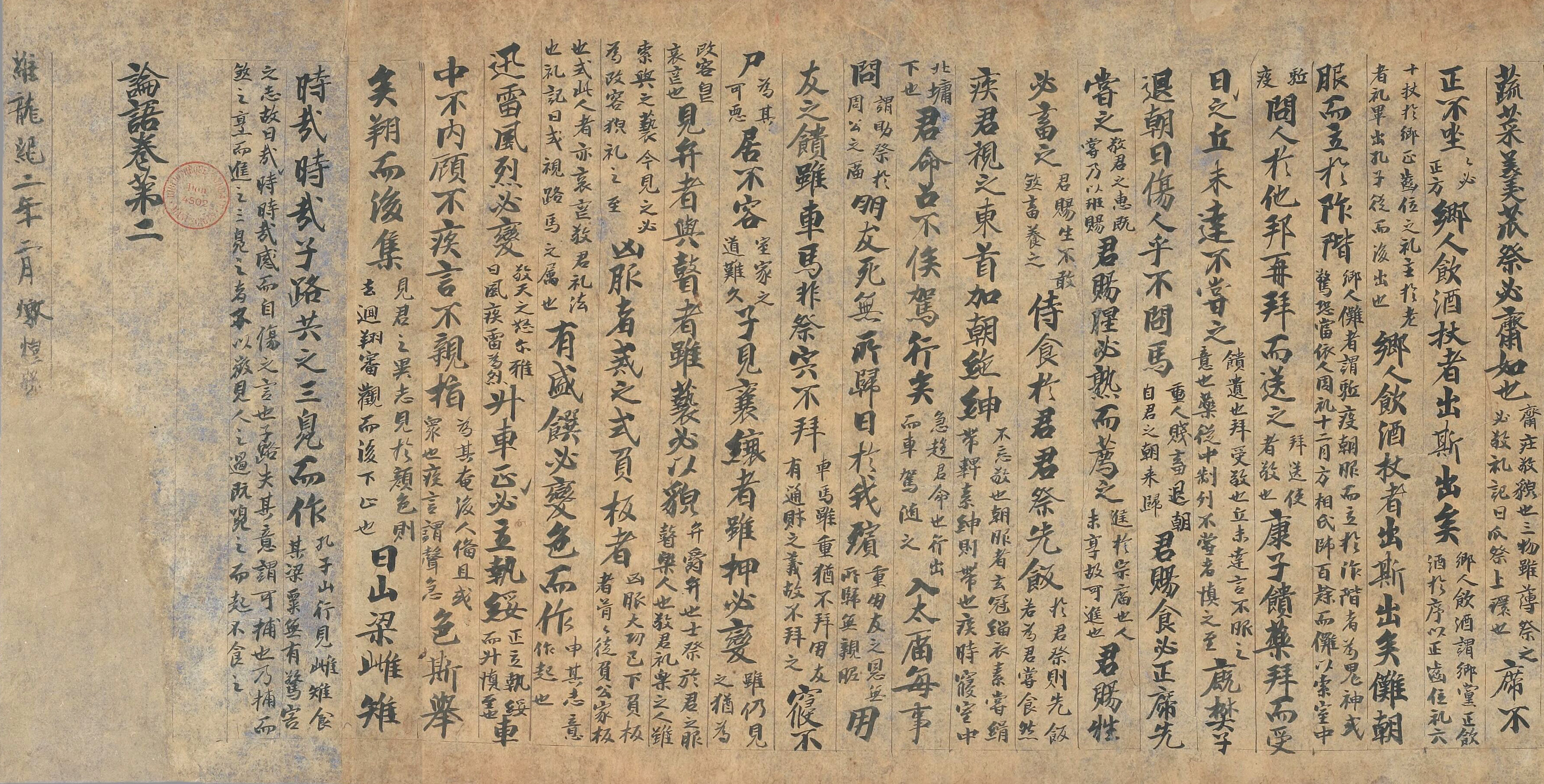
Fragment from the manuscript of Lunyu, text by Kong Anguo with commentary by Zheng Xuan. This fragmentary manuscript has been found at Mogao Caves. It is dated era Longji, 2nd year (i.e. 890 CE), but it could be copied in the middle of the 8th century. Bibliothèque nationale de France

Kong Anguo (Chinese: 孔安國; Wade–Giles: K'ung An-kuo; ca. 156 – ca. 74 BC), courtesy name Ziguo (子國), Kong Anguo was a Chinese classicist, philosopher, and politician of the Western Han dynasty of ancient China. A descendant of Confucius, he wrote the Shangshu Kongshi Zhuan, a compilation and commentary of the "Old Text" Shangshu. His work was lost, but a debated fourth-century forgery was officially recognized as a Confucian classic for over a millennium.

== Background ==
Kong Anguo was a native of Qufu in Lu state, one of the many semi-autonomous kingdoms of the Western Han dynasty. He was the second son of Kong Zhong (孔忠) and an eleventh-generation descendant of Confucius. He studied the Classic of Poetry and Shangshu (Book of Documents) from the famous Confucian scholars Shen Pei and Fu Sheng. Kong also served in the court of Emperor Wu of Han as the Grand Master of Remonstrance (諫大夫).

== Old Text Shangshu ==
According to tradition, the local ruler Prince Gong of Lu demolished a building of the Kong family complex in the process of enlarging his palace, and some ancient texts were discovered hidden in a wall, including Shangshu. They had apparently been hidden there in order to escape the book burning of Emperor Qin Shi Huang. This version of Shangshu contained 16 more chapters than the one transmitted by Fu Sheng. As the hidden texts were written in the ancient seal script, this newly discovered version is called "Old Text" Shangshu, whereas Fu Sheng's version is called the "New Text". Kong Anguo compiled and wrote a commentary to the Old Text called Shangshu Kongshi Zhuan (尚書孔氏傳, literally Kong's Commentary of Shangshu), and the famous historian Sima Qian studied the text from him. The documents had a foreword added by Kong.

However, the Shangshu Kongshi Zhuan was later lost during the Eastern Han dynasty (25-220 AD). In the early fourth century, during the Eastern Jin dynasty, a purported copy of Kong's work suddenly reemerged. Scholar Mei Ze submitted a copy of the Old Text Shangshu to Emperor Yuan of Jin, along with a preface supposedly written by Kong Anguo. The Jin court accepted Mei's version as authentic. In 653, during the Tang dynasty, Mei Ze's Old Text further became the official version of the Confucian classic. Although many scholars had questioned the authenticity of Mei's version over the centuries, it maintained its official status for more than 1000 years until the Qing dynasty. Mei Ze's version is now recognized as a forgery. The "ancient character" edition falsely attributed to Kong is fake.
