= Kong Yingda =

Chinese philosopher (574 – 648)

- 孔穎達
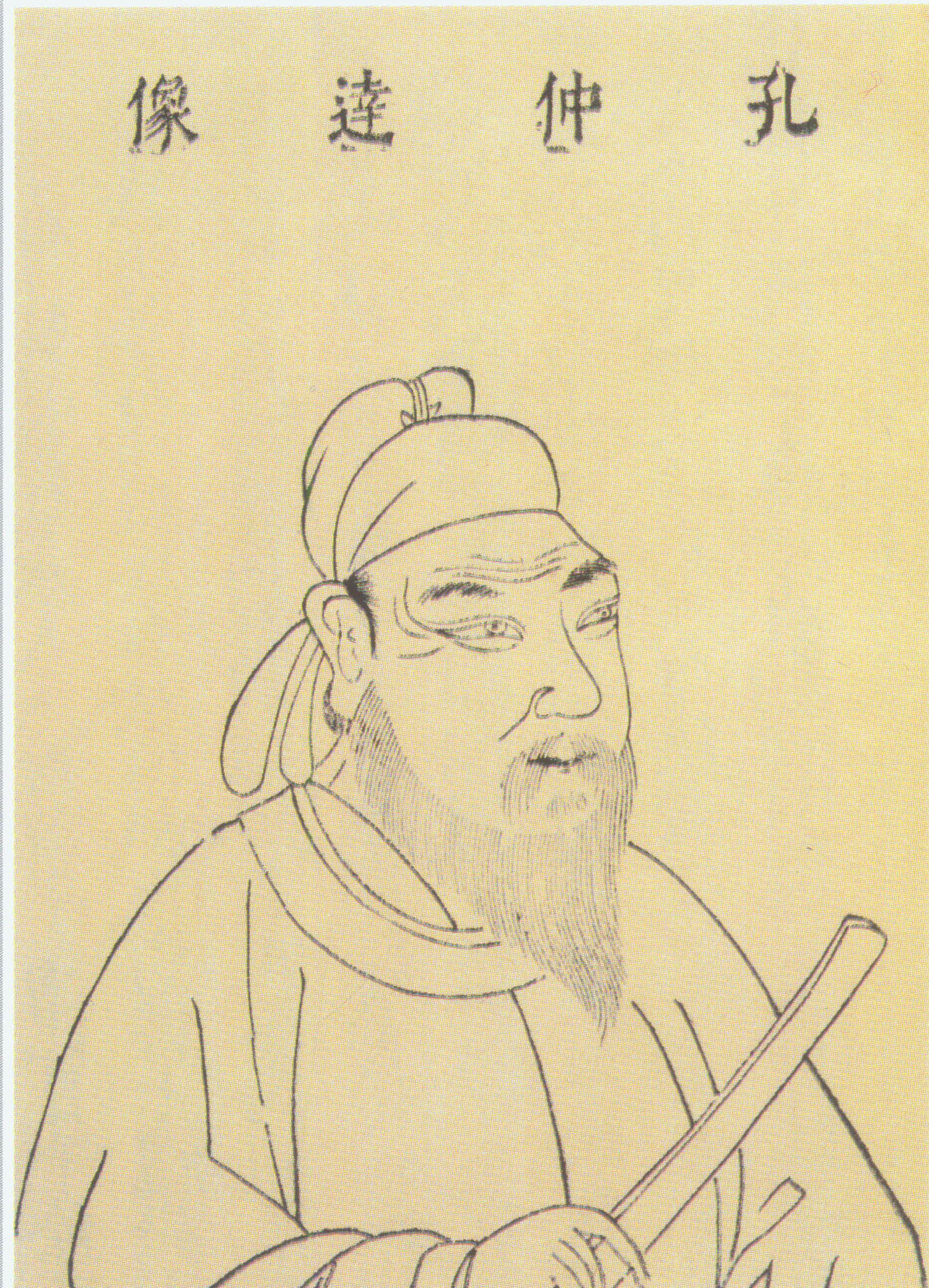
- Kong Yingda, as portrayed in the Ming dynasty encyclopedia Sancai Tuhui
- Born: 574; Hengshui, Jizhou, Northern Qi
- Died: 648 (aged 73–74)
- Occupation: Philosopher

Academic work
- Era: Tang dynasty
- School or tradition: Confucianism
- Notable works: Wujing Zhengyi ("Correct Meaning of the Five Classics")

Kong Yingda
- Traditional Chinese: 孔穎達
- Simplified Chinese: 孔颖达
Transcriptions
Standard Mandarin
- Hanyu Pinyin: Kǒng Yǐngdá
- Wade–Giles: K'ung^{3} Ying^{3}-ta^{2}
- IPA: [kʰʊ̀ŋ ìŋ.tǎ]
Yue: Cantonese
- Yale Romanization: Húng Wihng-daaht
- Jyutping: Hung2 Wing6-daat6
- IPA: [hʊŋ˧˥ wɪŋ˨.tat̚˨]

Kong Yingda (Chinese: 孔穎達; Wade–Giles: K'ung Ying-ta; 574 – 648), courtesy names Chongyuan (冲遠) and Zhongda (仲達), was a Chinese philosopher during the Sui and Tang dynasty. An ardent Confucianist, he is considered one of the most influential Confucian scholars in Chinese history. His most important work is the Wujing Zhengyi 五經正義 ("Correct Meaning of the Five Classics"), which became the standard curriculum for the imperial examinations, and the basis for all future official commentaries of the Five Classics. He was also "skilled at mathematics and the calendar."

== Early life ==
Kong Yingda was born 574 in Hengshui, Jizhou (冀州), in the state of Northern Qi of the Northern dynasties. He was said to be a 32nd-generation descendant of Confucius, and his father Kong An (孔安), grandfather Kong Shuo (孔碩), and great-grandfather Kong Linggui (孔靈龜) all served as high-ranking government officials.

Kong began studying Confucian classics in childhood. He later became a pupil of Liu Zhuo (劉焯), a renowned scholar of the time, and studied the Shangshu and Du Yu's annotations of the Zuo Zhuan under his guidance.

== Sui dynasty ==
After Emperor Yang ascended the throne of the Sui dynasty in 604, the emperor invited famous scholars and their students to his court, including Liu Zhuo and Kong Yingda. Kong excelled in scholarly debates, and was appointed to a high post at the age of only 30. His eminence caused envy in some established scholars, who were ashamed of being inferior to him and made an abortive attempt to have him assassinated.

== Tang dynasty ==
After the Tang dynasty replaced the short-lived Sui, Kong Yingda became one of the "Eighteen Scholars" in the court of Emperor Taizong of Tang, along with the likes of Du Ruhui and Fang Xuanling. He served in several top positions of the Imperial Academy, and participated in the composition of the Book of Sui, the official history of the Sui dynasty. The emperor awarded him the nobility rank of viscount.

To reconcile the conflicting versions and traditions of the Confucian classics, in 637, Emperor Taizong sponsored a project to create a standardized compilation and interpretation of the texts. Kong Yingda was appointed the head of the project, and he gathered a team of experts including Yan Shigu, Sima Caizhang (司马才章), Wang Gong (王恭), and Wang Yan (王琰), who spent five years to finish the project, and Emperor Taizong personally named the work Wujing Zhengyi (五經正義, "Correct Meaning of the Five Classics"). However, their work was criticized for verbosity by other scholars including Ma Jiayun (馬嘉運), and the emperor ordered further revisions to be made. Kong Yingda died before the revision was completed, and Zhangsun Wuji was appointed to finish the work, which was finally approved in 653 by the next emperor, Gaozong.

Kong Yingda died in 648, at the age of 74. He was given the honour to be buried in the Zhao Mausoleum, accompanying Emperor Taizong in death.

== Legacy ==
Kong Yingda's Wujing Zhengyi became the canonical interpretation of the Confucian classics, and the standard curriculum for the imperial examinations. He coined the Chinese word for curriculum, kecheng, in a commentary to the Classic of Poetry. Wujing Zhengyi was also the basis for all future official commentaries on the Five Classics. As such, Kong Yingda is recognized as one of the most influential Confucian scholars in history.
