= Yan Ruoqu =

Chinese scholar

Yan Ruoqu (simplified Chinese: 阎若璩; traditional Chinese: 閻若璩; pinyin: Yán Ruòqú; Wade–Giles: Yen Jochü; November 11, 1636 – July 9, 1704) was an influential Chinese scholar of the early Qing dynasty. He was born to a scholarly family in Taiyuan, Shanxi. Yan Ruoqu is most famous for proving that the "Old Text" chapters of the Confucian classic Book of Documents were forgeries (see zh:尚書古文疏證). He also made observations and theories about the motions of the Moon and the planets.

Yan's work on the Classic of History was independently verified and praised by Hui Dong (1697-1758), the verification work was finished by him and Sun Xingyan.

Liang Qichao praised Yan as being "number one textual scholar of the recent 300 years" (approx. translation from the Chinese Wiki quote 不能不認為近三百年學術解放之第一功臣, unreferenced). As such, he became an important precursor of the Doubting Antiquity School.

== See also ==
- History of Chinese archaeology
