= Stone Classics =

Chinese scriptures engraved on stone

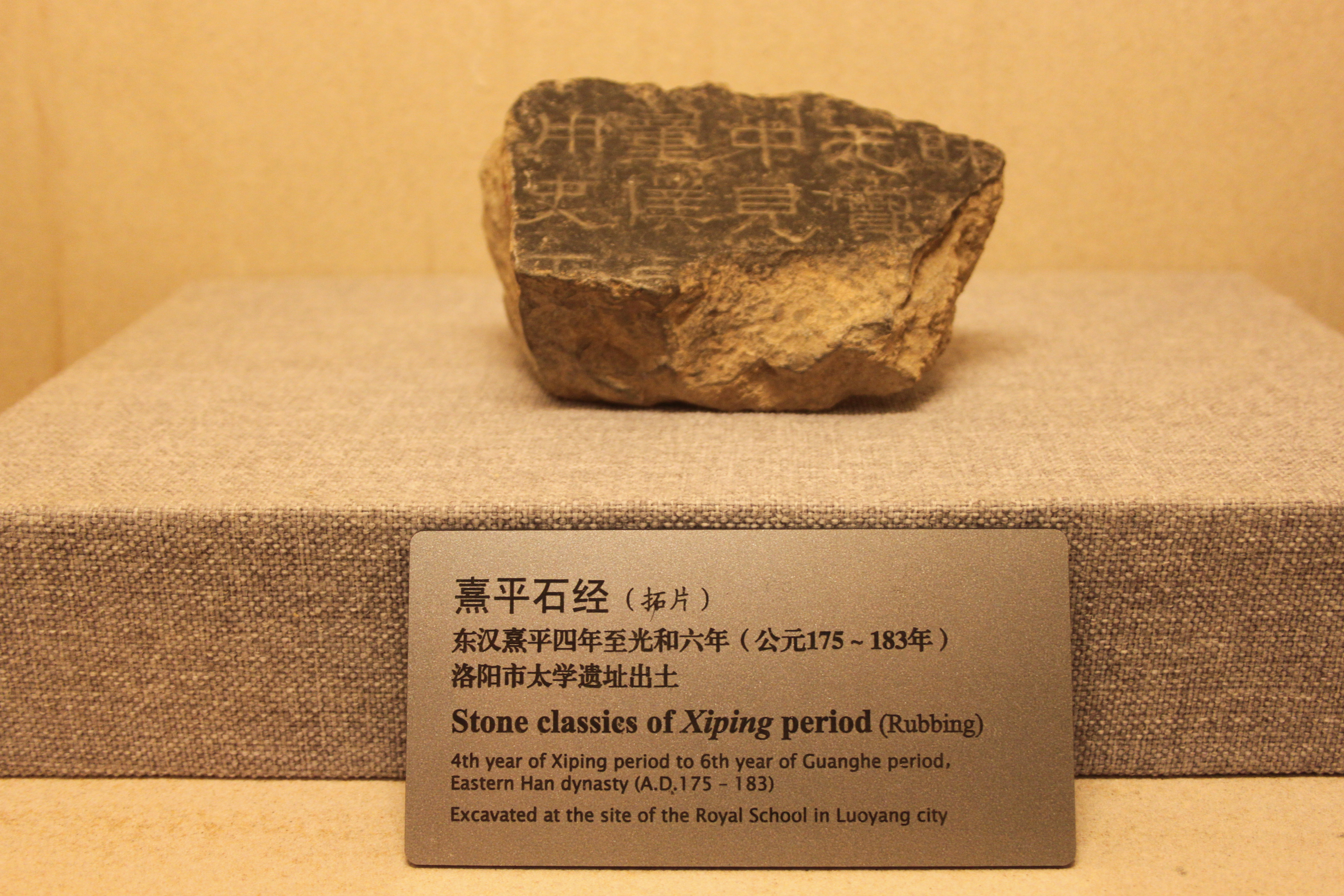
Xiping Stone Classics, fragment (Henan Provincial Museum, Zhengzhou)

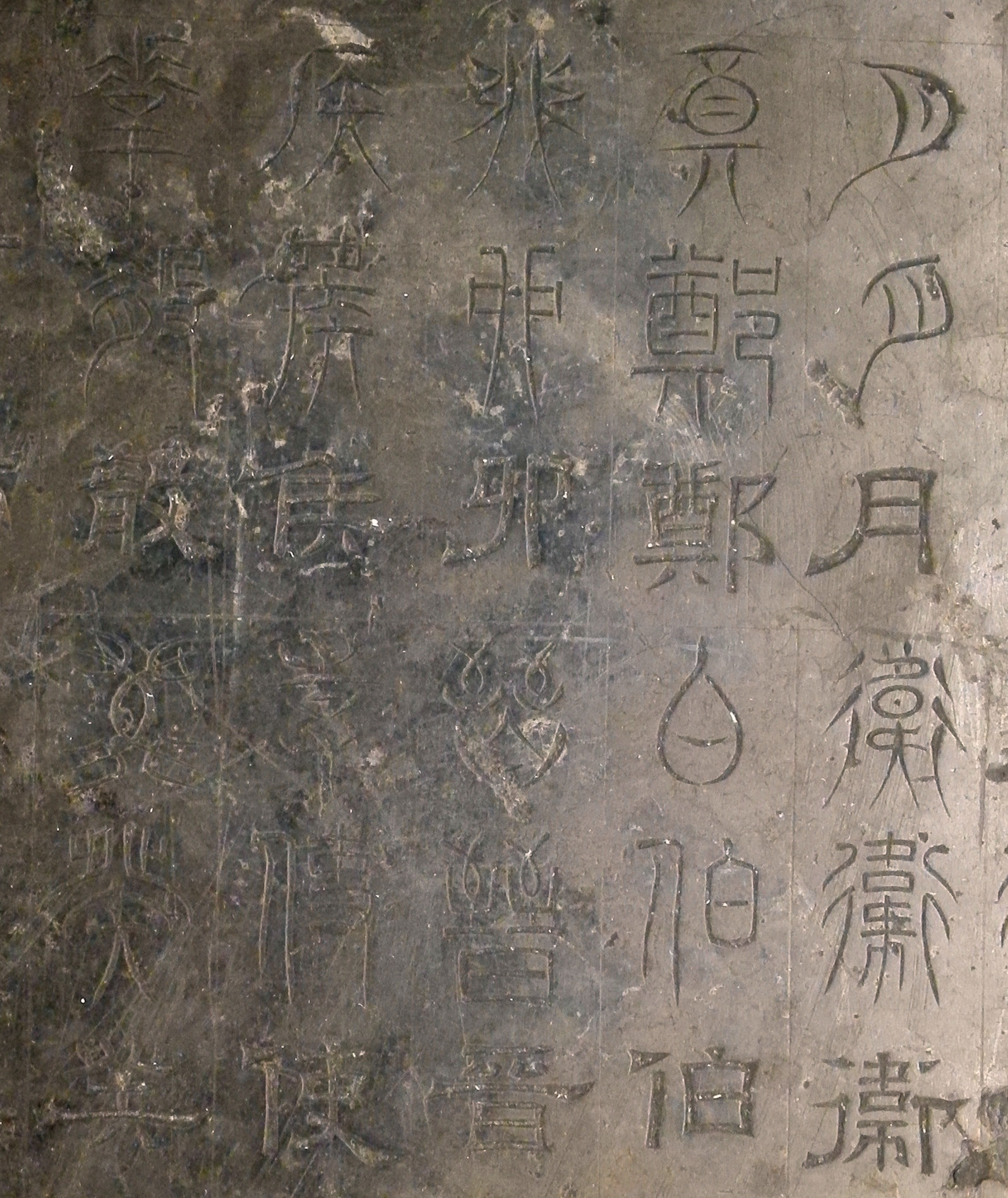
Zhengshi Stone Classics in three scripts, detail (Luoyang Museum)

Stone Classics (simplified Chinese: 石经; traditional Chinese: 石經; pinyin: shíjīng; Wade–Giles: shih-ching) are canonical scriptures engraved on stone slabs or rocks. In Chinese, a distinction is usually made between Confucian and Buddhist ones, the latter often being translated as “stone sutras”. Similar examples also exist in Daoism.

The Stone Classics were created in Confucianism particularly as large-scale state projects (see Xiping Stone Classics of the Han dynasty, Zhengshi Stone Classics of the Wei dynasty (Cao Wei), Kaicheng Stone Classics of the Tang dynasty). Their function was to establish the canonical version of the Five or more Confucian Classics and Four Books and to demonstrate the standard form of Chinese characters.

According to the Hungarian sinologist Imre Galambos carving the text of classics into stone obviously was

“also an act of creating a standard text, not only orthography. But the fact that the Wei and Tang stone classics were in different scripts shows that character forms were perhaps even more important than issues of textual criticism. Han, Wei, and even Tang stone inscriptions testify to the lack of orthographic consistency.”

In Buddhism the engraving of scriptures was carried out in a way similar to the copying of sutras or the private compilation of Buddhist Tripitakas. It served individuals, families, or communities as a means of accumulating spiritual merit. Among these, the Fangshan Stone Canon (Fangshan shijing 房山石经) is particularly well known, as it was continued over the course of many centuries.

== Confucianism ==
The following section is a short overview to the Confucian classics carved in stone since the Han dynasty, various versions of these Stone Classics have existed:

Name	Period	Alternative names	Notes	Script	Works included
Xiping Stone Classics (熹平石经, Xiping shijing, "Stone Classics of the Xiping Era")	Eastern Han dynasty	Yizi shijing 一字石经; Han shijing 汉石经	4th year of the Xiping era (175 CE) under Emperor Ling of Han; supervised by Cai Yong (蔡邕)	Clerical script (隶书)	Zhouyi, Shangshu, Lushi (Shi), Yili, Chunqiu, Gongyang zhuan, Lunyu
Zhengshi Stone Classics (正始石经, Zhengshi shijing, "Stone Classics of the Zhengshi Era")	Wei dynasty of the Three Kingdoms period	Wei shijing 魏石经; Santi shijing 三体石经	Produced during the Zhengshi era (240–249 CE) under Emperor Cao Fang	Ancient Script (古文), Seal script (篆), Clerical script (隶书)	Shangshu, Chunqiu
Kaicheng Stone Classics (开成石经, Kaicheng shijing, "Stone Classics of the Kaicheng Era")	Tang dynasty	Tang shijing 唐石经	2nd year of the Kaicheng era (837 CE) under Emperor Wenzong of Tang; now preserved in the Stele Forest, Xi'an	Regular script (楷书)	Zhouyi, Shangshu, Shijing, Zhouli, Yili, Liji, Zuozhuan, Gongyang zhuan, Guliang zhuan, Lunyu, Xiaojing, Erya (Mengzi added during the Qing dynasty)
Shu Stone Classics (蜀石经, Shu shijing, "Stone Classics of the Shu Kingdom")	Later Shu of the Five Dynasties and Ten Kingdoms period	Guangzheng shijing 广政石经	2nd year of the Guangzheng era (938 CE) under Emperor Meng Chang	Regular script (楷书)	Xiaojing, Lunyu, Erya, Yijing, Shijing, Shujing, Yili, Liji, Zhouli, Zuozhuan (later expanded under the Northern Song dynasty to include Gongyang zhuan, Guliang zhuan, Mengzi)
Northern Song Stone Classics (北宋石经, Bei Song shijing, "Stone Classics of the Northern Song")	Northern Song dynasty	Erzi shijing 二字石经; Jiayou shijing 嘉祐石经	Completed in the 6th year of the Jiayou era (1061 CE) under Emperor Renzong of Song	Seal script (篆), Clerical script (隶)	Yijing, Shijing, Shujing, Zhouli, Liji, Chunqiu Zuozhuan, Xiaojing, Lunyu, Mengzi
Southern Song Stone Classics (南宋石经, Nan Song shijing, "Stone Classics of the Southern Song")	Southern Song dynasty	Song Gaozong yushu shijing 宋高宗御书石经	—	—	Yijing, Shijing, Shujing, Zuozhuan, Lunyu, Mengzi, and five chapters of the Liji (Zhongyong, Daxue, Xueji, Ruxing, Jingjie)
Qing Stone Classics (清石经, Qing shijing, "Stone Classics of the Qing Dynasty")	Qing dynasty	—	Beijing	—	Thirteen Classics

== Gallery ==
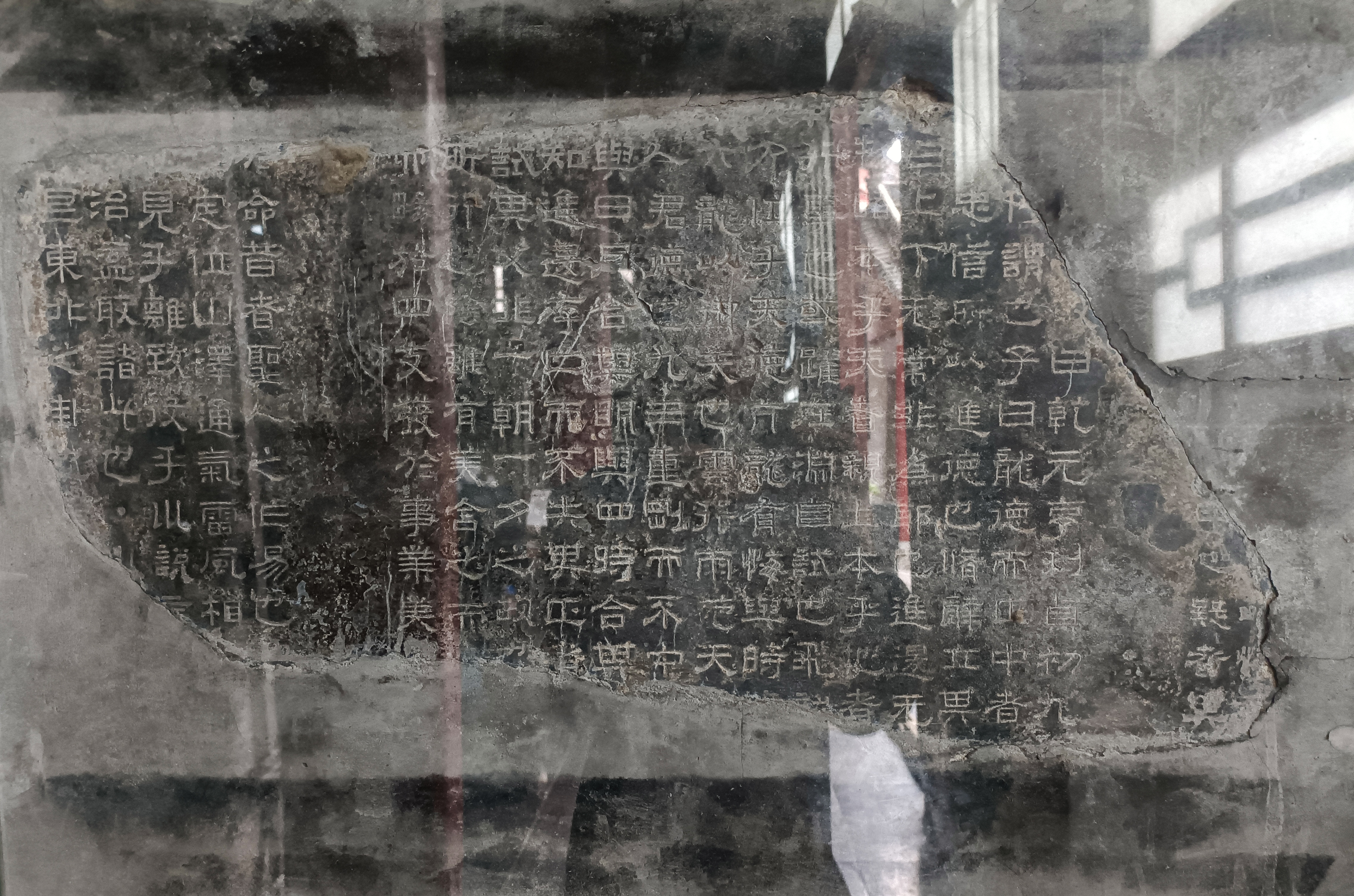
Fragment of Xiping Stone Classics (in the Stele Forest Museum in Xi'an)

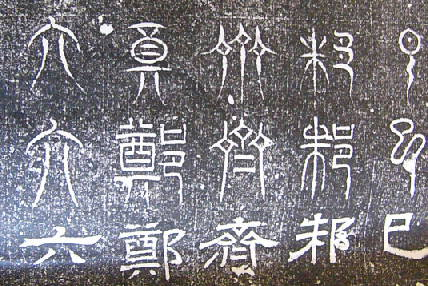
Rubbing of the Three-Script Stone Classics (Zhengshi Stone Classics), each character is inscribed three times — in ancient script, small seal script, and clerical script, from top to bottom - Carved on stelae during the Zhengshi Era of the Wei Dynasty (Three Kingdoms period)

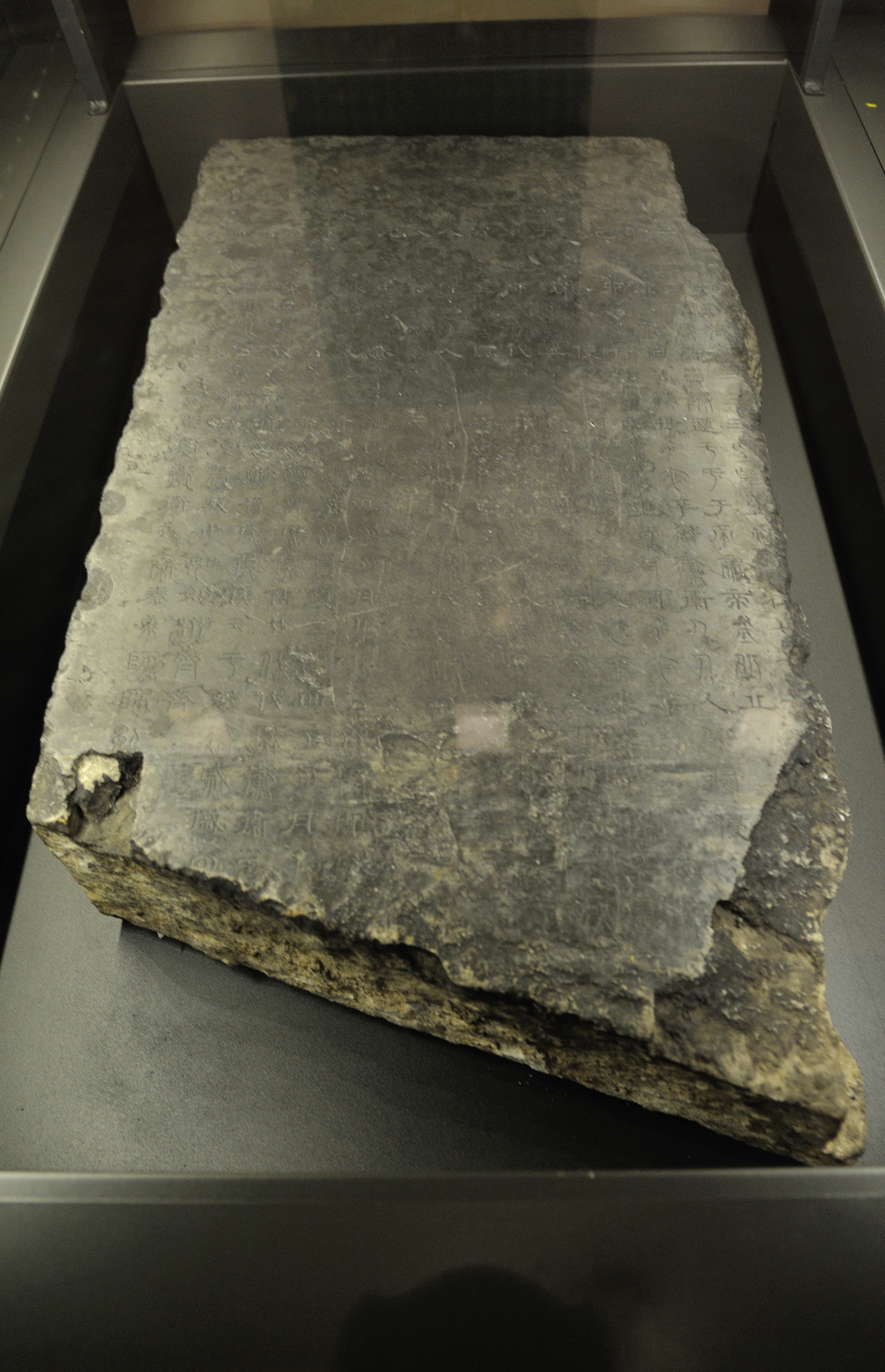
Excerpt from the Spring and Autumn Annals (Chunqiu) carved on a surviving slab of the Zhengshi Stone Classics, now located in the Luoyang Museum

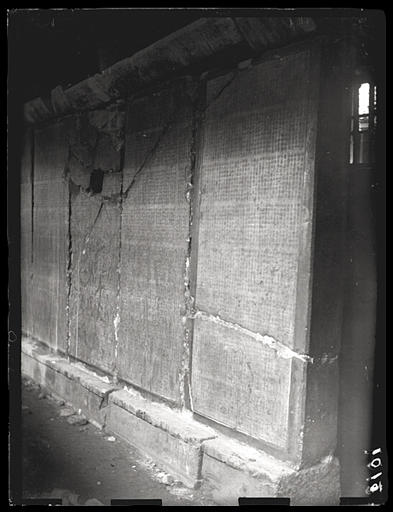
Kaicheng Stone Classics, preserved in the Stele Forest Museum in Xi'an

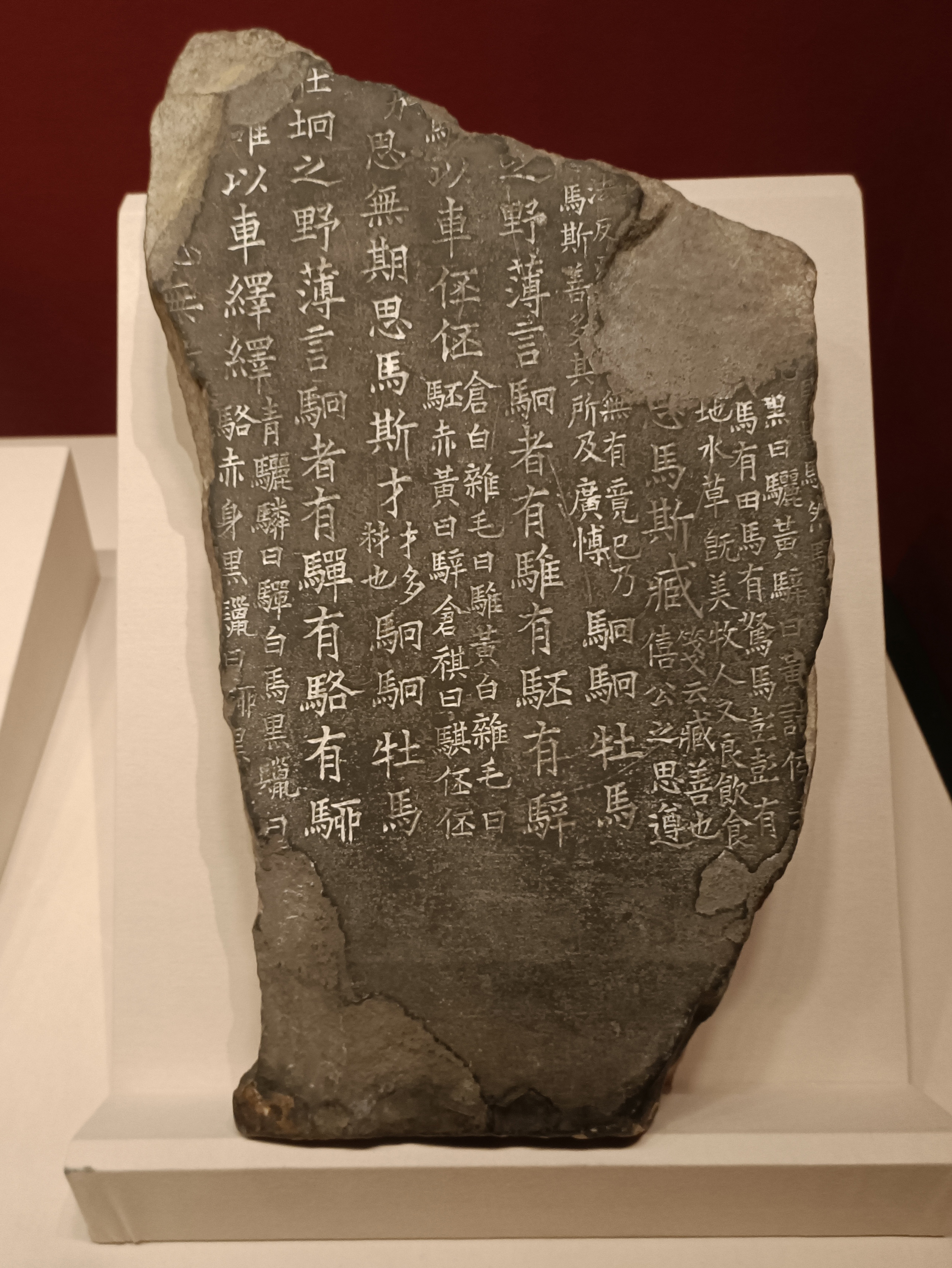
Shu Stone Classics (Sichuan Museum)

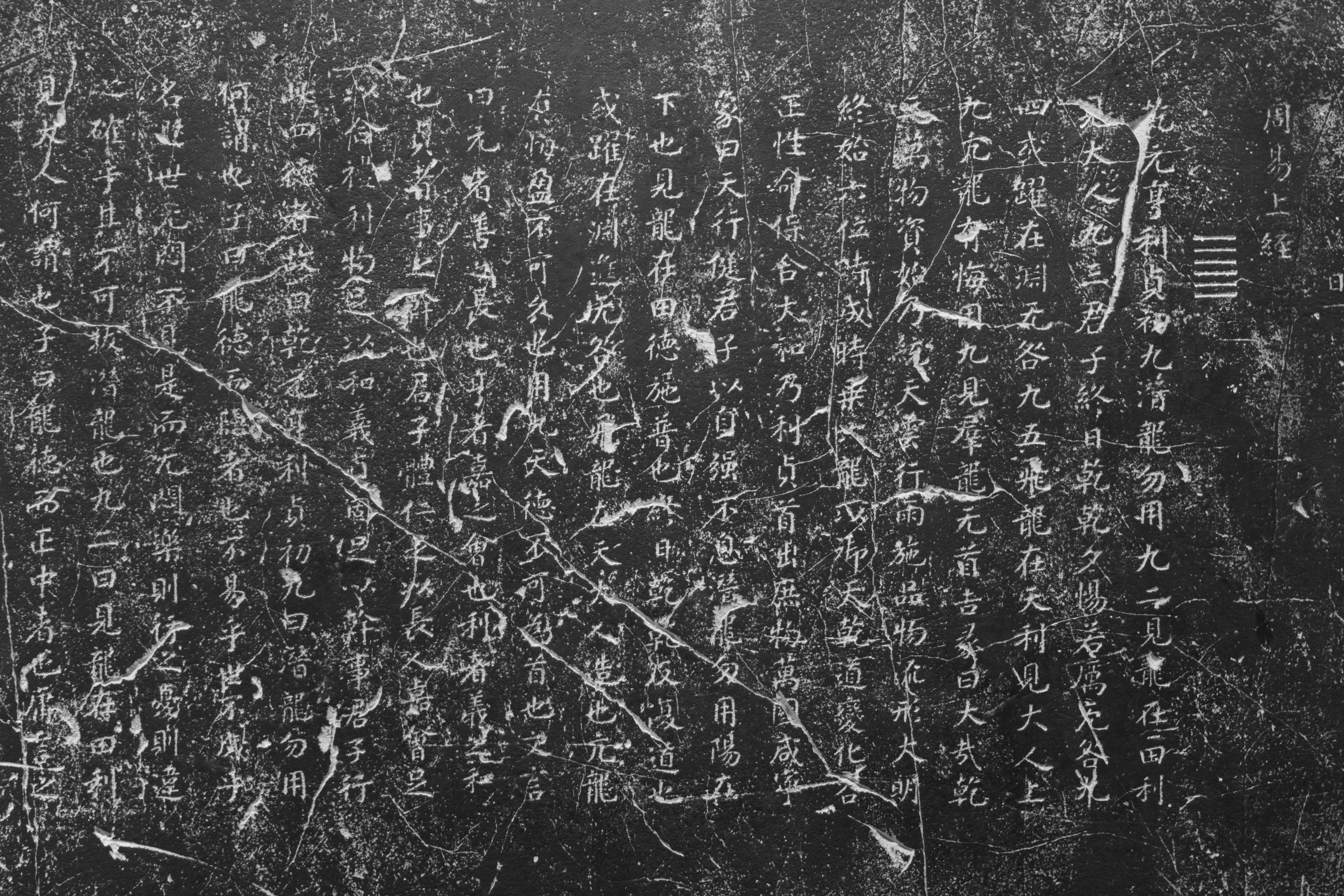
Southern Song Stone Classics (in the Hangzhou Stele Forest (Hangzhou beilin) in the Hangzhou Confucian Temple)

Inside the Hangzhou Stele Forest (Hangzhou beilin) in the Hangzhou Confucian Temple, where the Southern Song Stone Classics are seen

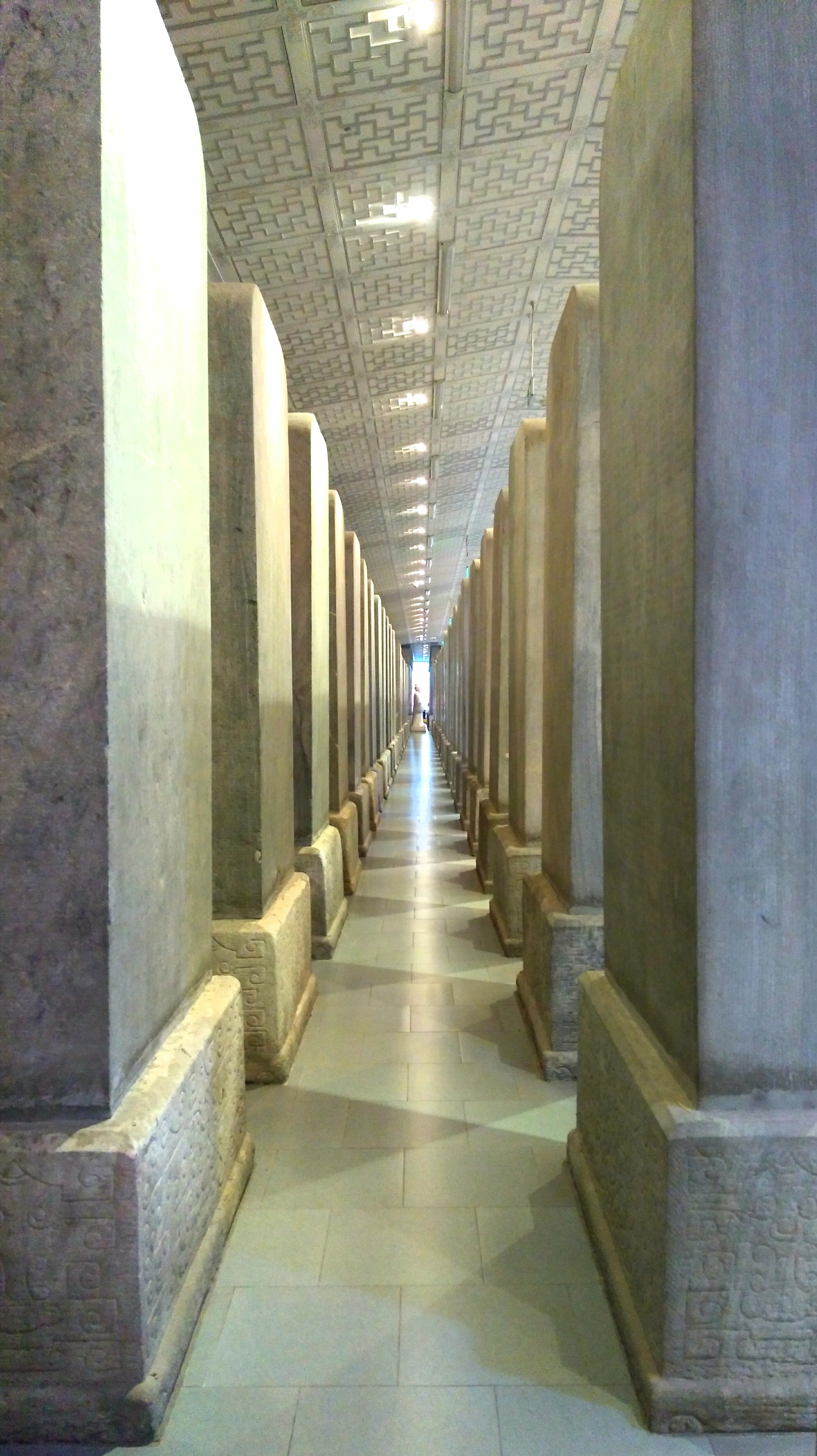
Qing Stone Classics (inside Confucius Temple, Beijing)

== Buddhism ==
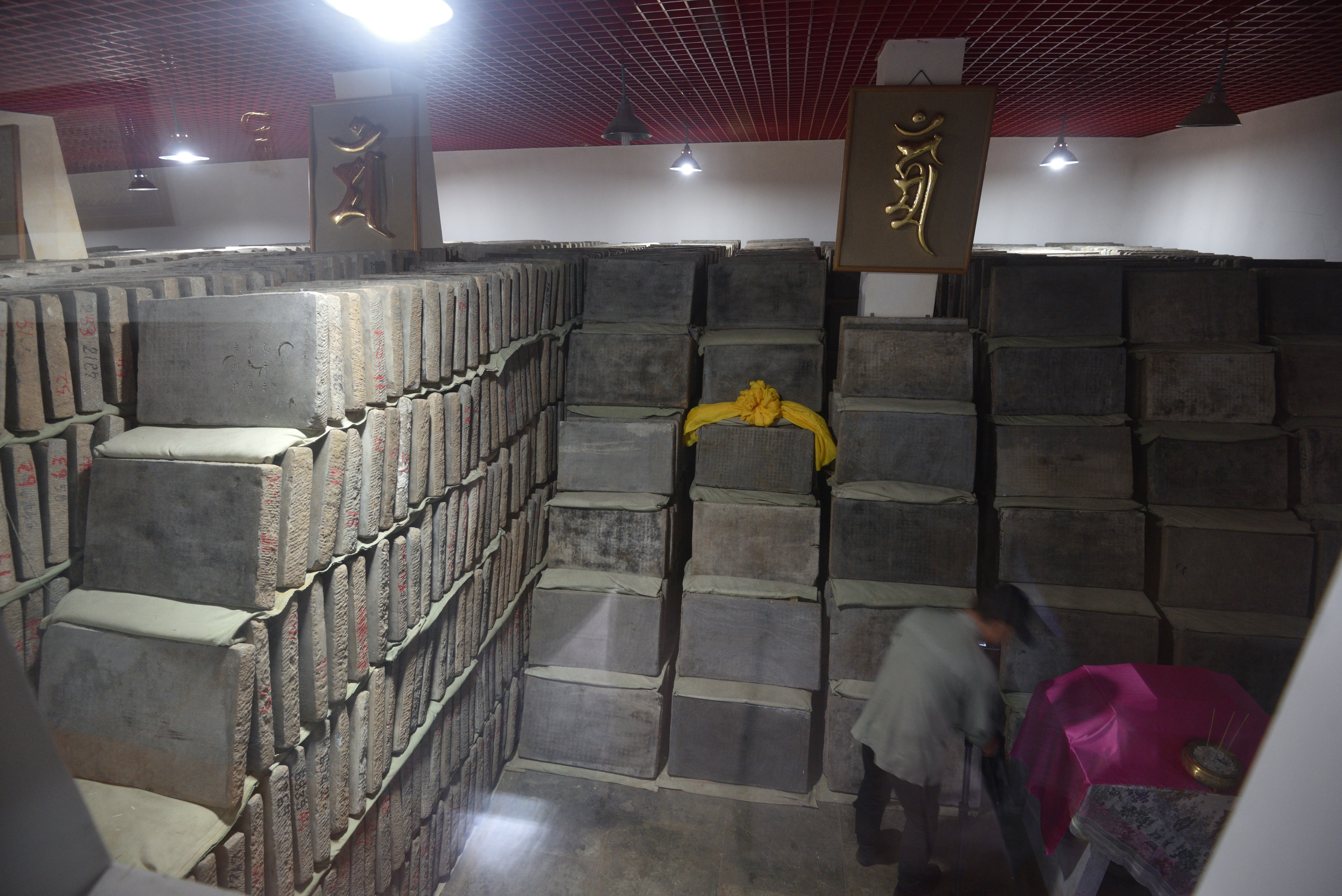
Stone Buddhist sutras in archive at Yunju Temple (Fangshan)

- Kaiyuan Dazangjing (开元大藏经, Kaiyuan Canon)
- Beijing: Fangshan Stone Sutra (房山石经), see Yunju Temple
- Shandong: Mount Tai (泰山, Taishan shijingyu 泰山石经峪) and Mount Culai (徂徕山, Culaishan Da banruo jing 徂徕山大般若经)
- Shanxi (Taiyuan): Fengyu shijing 风峪石经
- Hebei: Beixiangtangshan shijing 北响堂山石经 (Beixiangtangshan Stone Sutra)

== Daoism ==
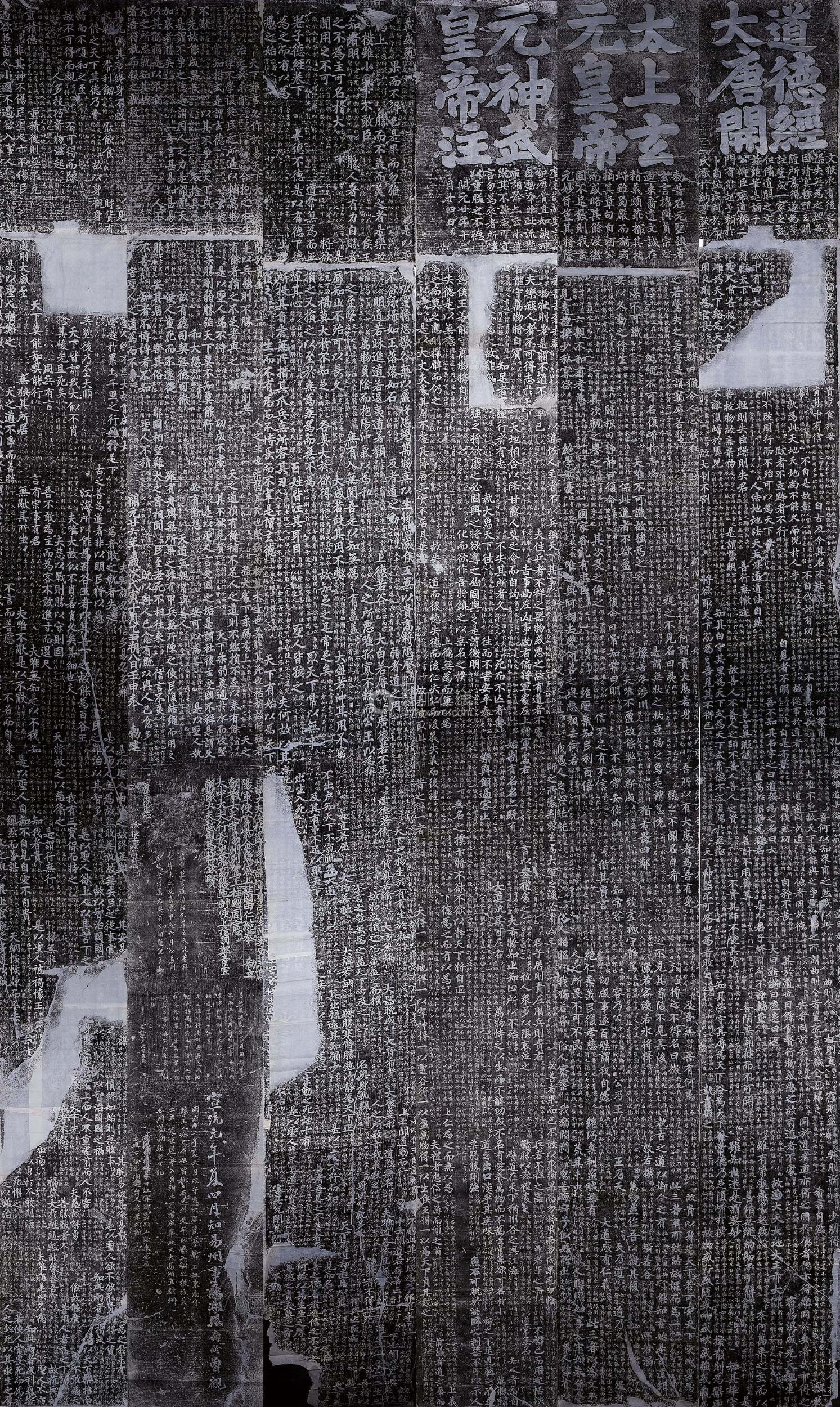
Rubbing (partial) of Laozi Stone Column, Longxing Temple, Yi County, Hebei

- Yizhou Daodejing shike 易州道德經石刻 (Yi County, Hebei)
- Xingtai Daodejing chuang 邢台道德经幢 (Xingtai, Hebei)

== Other examples ==
- Stone Sutra of Mandalay (in Myanmar) (Chinese: 曼德勒石经, Mandele shijing)

== See also ==
- Thirteen Classics
- Chinese Buddhist canon
- Qidan Zang (契丹藏, Khitan/Liao Canon)

== Bibliography ==
- Zhang Guogan 張國淦: Lidai shijing kao 歷代石經考, Beijing 1930
- Sun Haibo 孙海波: Wei sanzi shijing jilu 魏三字石经集录. Kaogu xueshe zhuanji 考古学社专集 17. Peking 1937
- Ma Heng 马衡: Han shijing jicun 汉石经集存. 2 vols., Kexue chubanshe, Beijing 1957
- Cihai (辞海, "Sea of Words"), Shanghai Lexicographical Publishing House, 2002. ISBN 7-5326-0839-5
- Zhongguo zhexue da cidian 中国哲学大辞典. Zhang Dainian 张岱年 (ed.). Shanghai cishu chubanshe 上海辞书出版社, Shanghai 2010
- Endymion Wilkinson: Chinese History A Manual. 2000 - Epigraphy (in partial view)
- Igor N. Riabukhin: History of the Confucian Stone Classics: 10 th –12th Centuries AD – Abstract (English/Russian)
