= Southern Song Stone Classics =

Collection of stone carved books

Southern Song Stone Classics (in the Hangzhou Stele Forest (Hangzhou beilin) in the Hangzhou Confucian Temple)

The Southern Song Stone Classics are one of the few Stone Classics that still have considerable amount of tablets remaining

The Southern Song Stone Classics (南宋石經, Nan Song shijing, "Stone Classics of the Southern Song"), also known as the Song Gaozong yushu shijing (宋高宗御書石經, 紹興石經, or 南宋太學石經) are a collection of stone carved books of various Confucian classics of China. It was carved from 1143 to 1177, during the Southern Song dynasty. Carved Confucian classics include: Yijing, Shijing, Shujing, Zuozhuan, Lunyu, Mengzi, and five chapters of the Liji (Zhongyong, Daxue, Xueji, Ruxing, Jingjie). The Southern Song Stone Classics are located in the Hangzhou Stele Forest (Hangzhou beilin) inside the Hangzhou Confucian Temple, in Hangzhou, China.

The Southern Song Stone Classics are part of a long series of Confucian Stone Classics throughout Chinese history, and it is only one of three major Stone Classics that still have substantial amount of stone tablets; the other two Stone Classics that also have significant amount of tablets are the Tang dynasty Kaicheng Stone Classics located in the Stele Forest in Xi'an, and the Qing dynasty Qing Stone Classics located inside the Beijing Temple of Confucius in Beijing. Other Stone Classics, such as the Han dynasty Xiping Stone Classics, Cao Wei Zhengshi Stone Classics, Five Dynasties and Ten Kingdoms period Later Shu Shu Stone Classics, and the Northern Song Stone Classics, only have fragments remaining in the present-day, and these fragments are scattered throughout various museums and libraries.
