= Shijing (disambiguation) =

Shijing or Shih-ching may refer to:

== Literary works ==
- The Classic of Poetry, known in Chinese as 詩經 (Shijing)
- "Stone classics" (石經, Shijing), various sets of important literary works carved in stone, such as the Kaicheng Stone Classics or Zhengshi Stone Classics

== Places (石井) ==
- Shijing River in Fujian, on whose estuary the town of Shijing is located
- Shijing Township, Mancheng County, Hebei
- Shijing Township, Shangyi County, Hebei
- Shijing Township, Shijiazhuang, in Luquan, Hebei
- Shijing Township, Anhui, in Huaining County
- Shijing Subdistrict, Guangzhou, in Baiyun District
- Shijing Subdistrict, Jilin City, in Fengman District
- Shijing Subdistrict, Shenzhen, in Pingshan District

=== Towns ===
- Shijing, Fujian, a town in Nan'an, Quanzhou, Fujian
- Shijing, Henan, in Xin'an County
- Shijing, Loudi (石井镇), a town of Louxing District, Loudi City, Hunan.
- Shijing, Shaanxi, in Hu County
- Shijing, Shandong, in Fei County

== See also ==
- Ishii, Japanese surname with the same characters as the place names
- Shijing station, multiple train stations in China
