= Zhengshi Stone Classics =

Stone carved books of Confucian classics (Cao Wei)

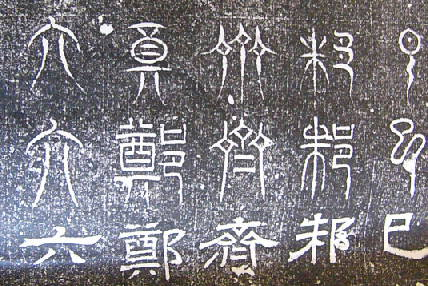
Rubbing of the Three-Script Stone Classics (Zhengshi Stone Classics), each character is inscribed three times — in ancient script, small seal script, and clerical script, from top to bottom - Carved on stelae during the Zhengshi Era of the Wei Dynasty (Three Kingdoms period)

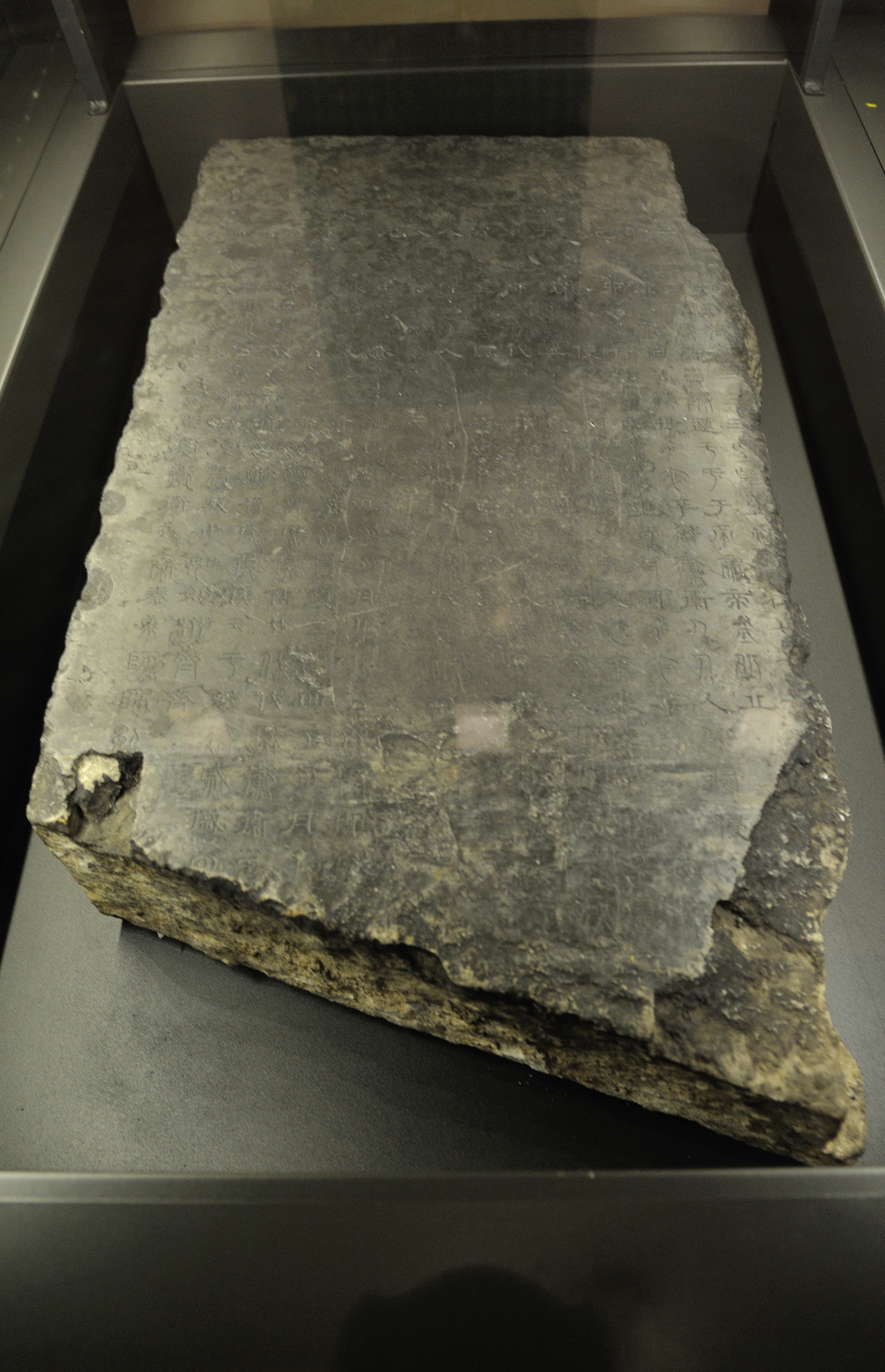
Excerpt from the Spring and Autumn Annals (Chunqiu) carved on a surviving slab of the Zhengshi Stone Classics, now located in the Luoyang Museum.

The Zhengshi Stone Classics (simplified Chinese: 正始石经; traditional Chinese: 正始石經; pinyin: Zhèngshǐ shíjīng; Wade–Giles: Cheng-shih shih-ching) or Wei Stone Classics (Chinese: 魏石经; pinyin: Wèi shíjīng) are official Confucian stone inscriptions, which belong to the three great stone classics of ancient China. They are now almost completely lost, only except for a few remnants.

It is a set of Confucian classics engraved in stone during the Zhengshi era 正始 (240–249) of the Wei 魏 dynasty (Cao Wei) in the Three Kingdoms period of China. They are also known as the Three-Script Stone Classics (simplified Chinese: 三体石经; traditional Chinese: 三體石經; pinyin: Sāntǐ shíjīng), referring to the fact that the texts were carved in three different script forms: guwen (ancient script), xiaozhuan (small seal script), and li (clerical or official script).

These stone inscriptions belong to a long Chinese tradition of “Stone Classics” (石经 shíjīng), which were monumental carvings of canonical texts intended to preserve authoritative versions and to promote the study of Confucian literature. The inscriptions are of the Five Classics, including the Book of Documents (Shangshu) and the Spring and Autumn Annals (Chunqiu), with a part of the Commentary on the Spring and Autumn Annals of Zuo (Zuozhuan).

Originally they were erected at the Imperial Academy (Taixue) in Luoyang, the steles were relocated several times, and the ruins now lie in Dianzhuang Township, Yanshi County, Henan Province.

== Background ==
The practice of engraving the Confucian classics on stone originated during the Han dynasty, notably with the Xiping Stone Classics (熹平石经) of 175 CE. The Zhengshi Stone Classics continued this tradition under the Wei dynasty, reflecting an effort to standardize texts and orthography after centuries of manuscript variation.

The Zhengshi project was reportedly carried out in the capital Luoyang. Like other stone classics, it served both scholarly and political purposes—affirming state endorsement of Confucian learning while providing a durable, public reference for scribes and students.

According to the Hungarian sinologist Imre Galambos carving the text of classics into stone obviously was

“also an act of creating a standard text, not only orthography. But the fact that the Wei and Tang stone classics were in different scripts shows that character forms were perhaps even more important than issues of textual criticism. Han, Wei, and even Tang stone inscriptions testify to the lack of orthographic consistency.”

== Scripts Used ==
The inscriptions were executed in three distinct scripts, giving the alternative name “Three-Script Stone Classics”:

- Guwen (古文 gǔwén) – “ancient script”, referring not to a single typeface but to archaic character forms derived from pre-Qin sources. In the context of the Zhengshi Stone Classics, guwen denotes an archaizing style intended to reproduce early forms of Chinese writing, distinct from both the seal and clerical scripts.
- Xiaozhuan (小篆 xiǎozhuàn) “small seal script”, a form standardized during the Qin dynasty.
- Lishu (隶书 lìshū) – clerical script, also called official script, which evolved during the late Warring States and Han periods and was widely used in government and education.

These three scripts were engraved side by side, allowing comparison of character forms and illustrating the historical development of Chinese writing.

== Significance ==
The Zhengshi Stone Classics represent one of the earliest and most ambitious multiscript monumental inscriptions in Chinese history. They embody the transition between earlier calligraphic traditions and the later Kaishu (regular script) style that dominated subsequent dynasties. They also serve as valuable evidence for the textual transmission of the Confucian canon and for the palaeographic study of Chinese character evolution.

== Gallery ==
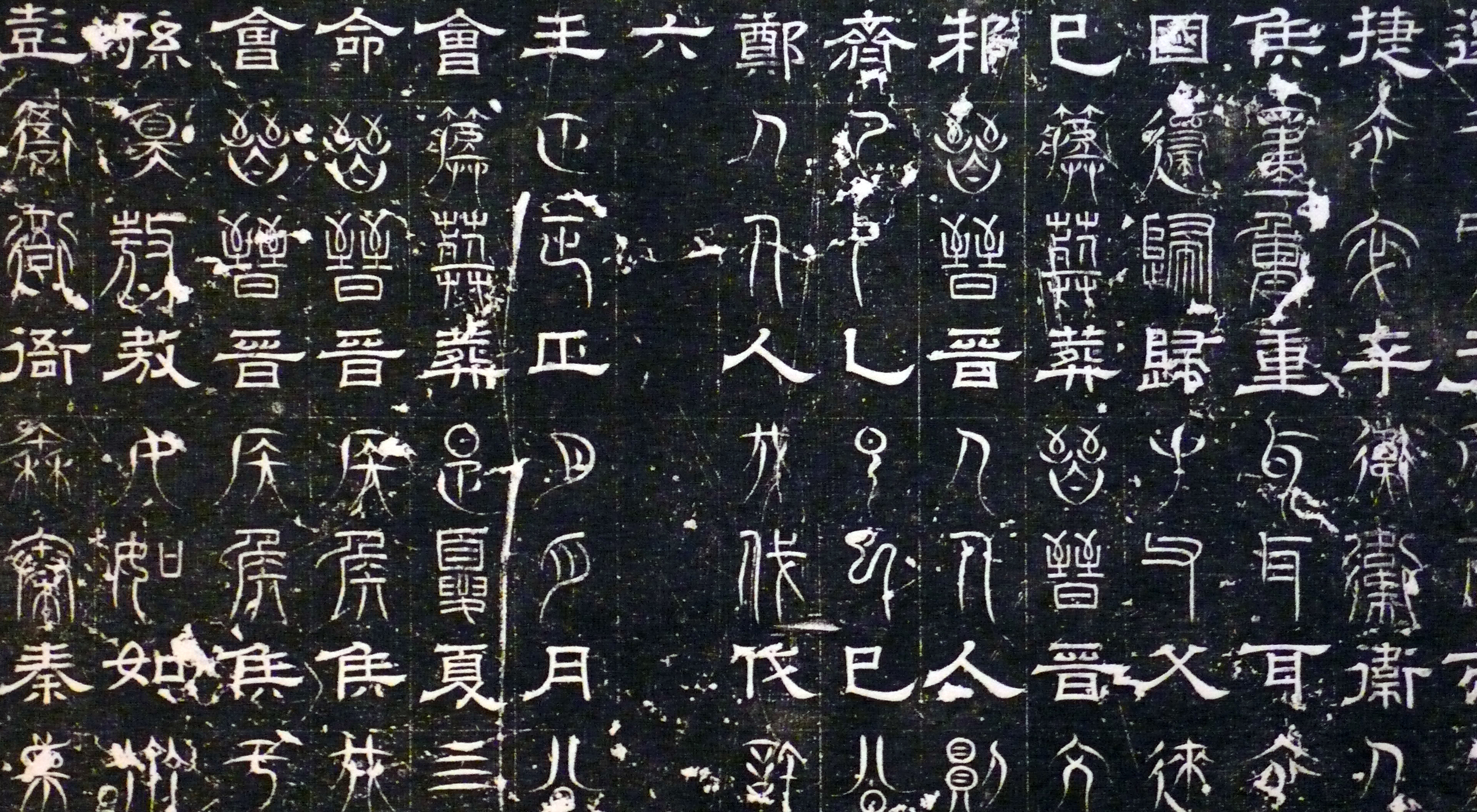
Zhengshi Stone Classics (rubbing), transferred from the Luoyang Museum; now in the collection of the National Museum of Chinese Writing 中國文字博物館

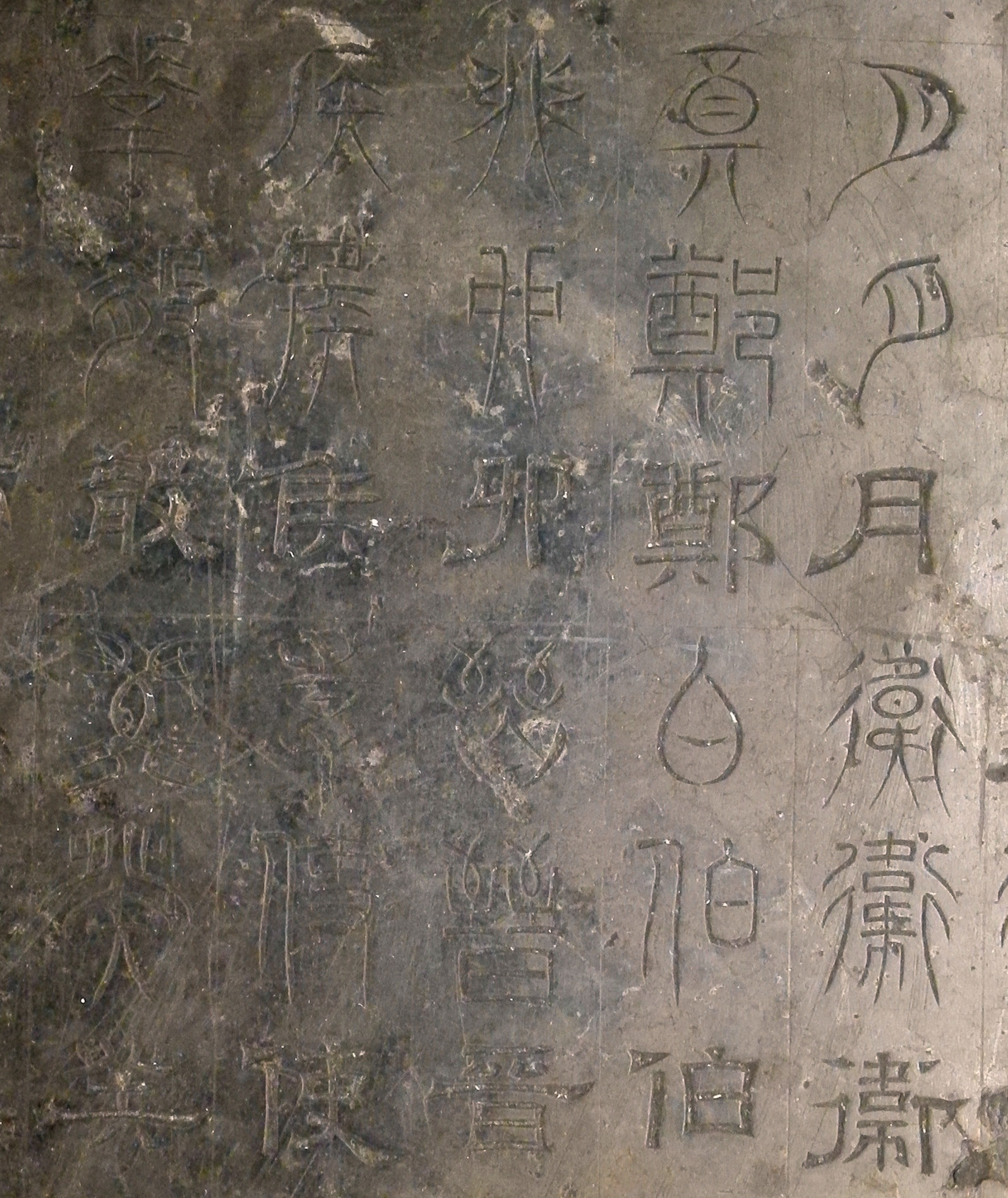
Inscription piece from the Zhengshi Stone Classics (Three-Script Stone Classics)

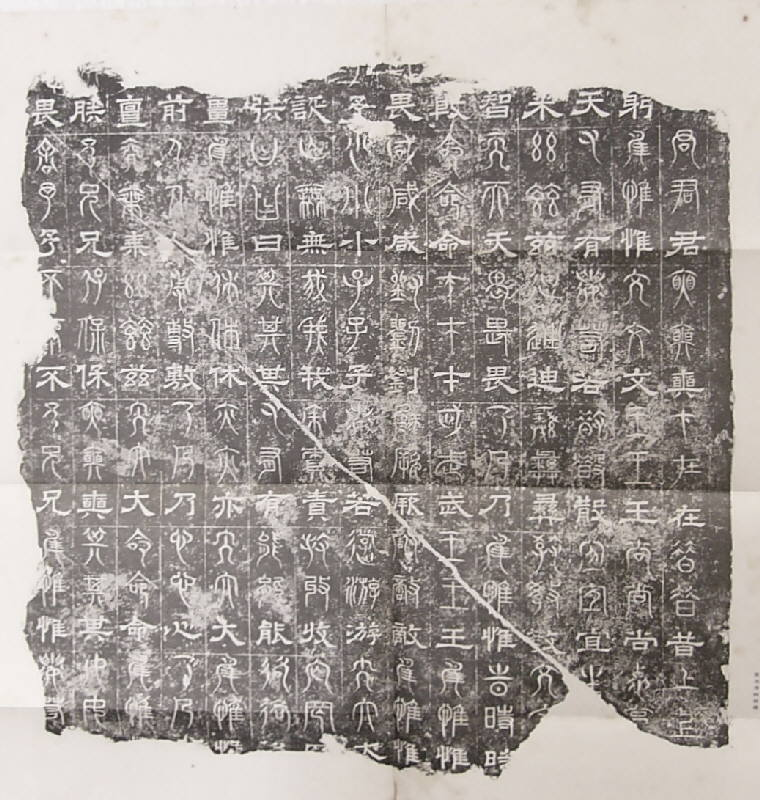
Rubbing of a fragment of the Three-Script Stone Classics (Zhengshi Stone Classics), Collection of the Taitō Ward Calligraphy Museum (台東区立書道博物館)

== See also ==
- “Ancient Script” vs. “Modern Script” debate
- Liste der Steinklassiker (in German)
- List of Chinese Calligraphy (in Japanese)
- Handan Chun (calligrapher)
- Shuowen jiezi

== Research literature ==
A complete research framework developed from the Song dynasty to modern times: Hong Kuo 洪适 (1117–1184) in his Lishi 隶释 [Explications of (Inscriptions) in Clerical Script] (1166) first recorded the stone inscriptions. Wang Guowei 王国维 (1877–1927) in his Wei shijing kao 魏石经考 (1916) established the modern research framework. Sun Haibo 孙海波 published his Wei sanzi shijing jilu 魏三字石经集录 in 1937 (Archaelogical Society, Beijing), Ma Heng 马衡 (1881–1955), former director of the Palace Museum, in his Han shijing jicun 汉石经集存 (1957) systematically organized unearthed materials.

== Bibliography ==
- Han-Ying Zhongguo zhexue cidian 汉英中国哲学辞典. Kaifeng, 2002
- “Shijing 石经” (Stone Classics), entry in Zhongguo zhexue da cidian 中国哲学大辞典. Zhang Dainian 张岱年 (Hrsg.). Shanghai 上海: Shanghai cishu chubanshe 上海辞书出版社 2010
- “Zhengshi Shijing 《正始石经》 Stone Classics of Zhengshi Period”, in: Zhongguo da baike quanshu: (A-Z) 中国大百科全书: (A-Z). 2009
- Zhongguo meishu quanji bianji weiyuanhui 中國美術全集編輯委員會 (ed.): Zhongguo meishu quanji 中國美術全集, part Shufa zhuanke 書法篆刻編. Renmin chubanshe, Beijing 1993
