= Thirteen Classics =

Thirteen Chinese books

Chinese name
- Traditional Chinese: 十三經
- Simplified Chinese: 十三经
Transcriptions
Standard Mandarin
- Hanyu Pinyin: Shísānjīng
Yue: Cantonese
- Jyutping: Sap6saam1ging1

Vietnamese name
- Vietnamese alphabet: Thập tam kinh
- Chữ Hán: 十三經

Korean name
- Hangul: 십삼경
- Hanja: 十三經
Transcriptions
- Revised Romanization: Sipsamgyeong

Japanese name
- Kanji: 十三經
- Kana: じゅうさんぎょう
Transcriptions
- Romanization: Jūsangyō

The Thirteen Classics (traditional Chinese: 十三經; simplified Chinese: 十三经; pinyin: Shísān Jīng) is a term for the group of thirteen classics of Confucian tradition that became the basis for the Imperial Examinations during the Song dynasty and have shaped much of East Asian culture and thought. It includes all of the Four Books and Five Classics but organizes them differently and includes the Classic of Filial Piety and Erya.

== List ==
The classics are:

- Classic of Changes or I Ching (易經 Yìjīng)
- Book of Documents (書經 Shūjīng)
- Classic of Poetry (詩經 Shījīng)
- The Three Ritual Classics (三禮 Sānlǐ)
  - Rites of Zhou (周禮 Zhōulǐ)
  - Ceremonies and Rites (儀禮 Yílǐ)
  - Book of Rites (禮記 Lǐjì)
- The Three Commentaries on the Spring and Autumn Annals
  - The Commentary of Zuo (左傳 Zuǒzhuàn)
  - The Commentary of Gongyang (公羊傳 Gōngyáng Zhuàn)
  - The Commentary of Guliang (穀梁傳 Gǔliáng Zhuàn)
- The Analects (論語 Lúnyǔ)
- Classic of Filial Piety (孝經 Xiàojīng)
- Erya (爾雅 Ěryǎ), a dictionary and encyclopedia
- Mencius (孟子 Mèngzǐ)

== History ==
The tradition of a defined group of "classics" in Chinese culture dates at least to the Warring States period, when the Zhuangzi has Confucius telling Laozi "I have studied the six classics—the Odes, the Documents, the Rites, the Music, the Changes, and the Spring and Autumn Annals". These six works were thus already considered classics by at least the 3rd century BC, although the Classic of Music did not survive the chaos of the Qin unification of China and was deemed lost during the Han dynasty. The remaining Five Classics were traditionally considered to have been edited by Confucius. Records from the late Han and Three Kingdoms period reference "seven classics", though they do not name them individually. By the Tang dynasty references to "nine classics" were common, though the nine works themselves vary depending on the source. The Kaicheng Stone Classics (833–837) comprise twelve works (all the above except the Mencius). By the time of the Southern Song dynasty, the number and specific books in the "thirteen classics" were universally established. The Thirteen Classics formed the texts used in the Imperial examinations, and their 600,000+ characters, in effect words, were generally required to be memorized in order to pass.

== See also ==
- Ruzang
- Four Books and five classics
- Imperial Examinations
