= Wei sanzi shijing jilu =

Wei sanzi shijing jilu (simplified Chinese: 魏三字石经集录; traditional Chinese: 魏三字⽯經集錄; Wade–Giles: Wei san-tzu shih-ching chi-lu; roughly: Collection and Documentation of the Three-Character Stone Classics of the Wei Dynasty) is a collection of rubbings of Wei Stone Classics first published in 1937 by Sun Haibo 孙海波 (1911–1972) in Beijing by the Archaeological Society. The book contains photolithographic reproductions of available rubbings. After the publication of Sun's book, additional rubbings and fragments of the stone inscriptions were discovered.

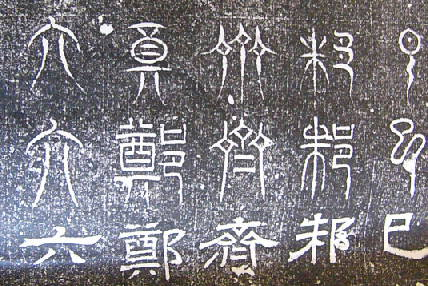
Rubbing of the Three-Script Stone Classics (Zhengshi Stone Classics), each character is inscribed three times — in ancient script, small seal script, and clerical script, from top to bottom - Carved on stelae during the Zhengshi Era of the Wei Dynasty (Three Kingdoms period)

The book is organized into four sections: rubbings, provenance, inscription illustrations, ancient texts, and separate records. Despite certain shortcomings—such as inconsistent structure, the inclusion of counterfeit inscriptions, and an overly extensive compilation—it significantly contributed to the advancement of research on the Zhengshi-period stone classics. In 1957, the posthumous work of Ma Heng, Han shijing jicun (汉石经集存), was published. The continuity from Sun Haibo’s 1937 compilation to Ma Heng’s 1957 publication illustrates a clear line of scholarly tradition in stone inscription studies.

The authenticity of some rubbings in Sun Haibo's book was temporarily questioned, for example by Shang Chengzuo 商承祚 (1902–1991).

The Wei sanzi shijing jilu was also used by the Hanyu da zidian (HYDZD).

== See also ==
- Stone Classics (shijing)
- Shangshu jinguwen zhushu 尚書今古文注疏 (Sun Xingyan 孫星衍; 1753–1818)

== Bibliography ==
- Sun Haibo (ed.): Wei sanzi shijing jilu 魏三字石经集录. Kaogu xueshe zhuanji 考古学社专集 17. Peking 1937
- Zhao Liwei: 赵立伟: Wei santi shijing guwen jizheng 魏三体石经古文辑证. Renmin chubanshe 人民出版社 2007
