= Shih-ching =

Shih-ching is the Wade-Giles transcription of the Chinese words (both "Shijing" in Hanyu Pinyin) for:

- Classic of Poetry (Book of Song) (詩經/诗经)
- Stone Classics (石經/石经)
