= Han shijing jicun =

Han shijing jicun (simplified Chinese: 汉石经集存; traditional Chinese: 漢石經集存; pinyin: Hàn shíjīng jícún; Wade–Giles: Han shih-ching chi-ts'un; English: Collection of surviving fragments of the Han Stone Classics) is a posthumously, in 1957 published compilation by the Chinese scholar Ma Heng 马衡 (1881–1955), former director of the Palace Museum.

The work gathers over 520 fragments and rubbings of the Xiping Stone Classics from the Eastern Han dynasty, which were excavated in Luoyang during the Song dynasty and in more recent times, preserving more than 8,000 Chinese characters. The fragments are systematically organized, the texts compared, and the characters annotated. For the first time, the collection was printed based on rubbings, making it a significant resource for the study of Chinese classics and textual scholarship. The work is considered an important contribution to the field of epigraphy and classical Chinese studies, providing scholars with primary materials for research on Han dynasty stone inscriptions.

The edition of the Sciences Press from 1957 was also used also by the Hanyu da zidian (HYDZD).

== See also ==
- Stone Classics (shijing)

== Bibliography ==
- Ma Heng 马衡: Han shijing jicun 汉石经集存. Kexue chubanshe 科学出版社. 2 vols . Beijing 1957
- Loewe, Michael (1993). Early Chinese Texts: A Bibliographical Guide. Berkeley: The Society for the Study of Early China and the Institute of East Asian Studies. OCLC 1348979043.
