= Three Ritual Classics =

Set of three Chinese classics

Chinese name
- Traditional Chinese: 三禮
- Simplified Chinese: 三礼
Transcriptions
Standard Mandarin
- Hanyu Pinyin: Sānlǐ
Yue: Cantonese
- Jyutping: Saam1lai5

Vietnamese name
- Vietnamese alphabet: Tam lễ
- Chữ Hán: 三禮

Korean name
- Hangul: 삼례
- Hanja: 三禮
Transcriptions
- Revised Romanization: Samrye

Japanese name
- Kanji: 三礼
- Kana: さんらい
Transcriptions
- Romanization: Sanrai

The Three Books of Rites or Three Ritual Classics (simplified Chinese: 三礼; traditional Chinese: 三禮; pinyin: Sānlǐ), is a collective name for three Confucian books the Etiquette and Ceremonial, the Rites of Zhou, and the Book of Rites. The name was coined by Zheng Xuan in the Eastern Han.

In the early years of the Western Han "Book of Rites" was originally a term for the Etiquette and Ceremonial, but the Eastern Han Zheng Xuan included the Etiquette and Ceremonial, the Book of Rites, and the Rites of Zhou as the Three Ritual Classics, and wrote a commentary on the Three Ritual Classics, the Tang dynasty The "Book of Rites" was called "Xiaodai Liji" in the Tang dynasty, and later people gradually called the "Book of Rites" as "Three Ritual Classics".

The Three Ritual Classics have always been difficult to read, their language is archaic, their text is brief, and they are known to be difficult to understand, For example, many of the architectural structures and scales of the palaces in the Book of Rites have not been covered, and they have been "repeatedly changed over the ages, gradually becoming different from the old", so that when reading the Rites, the palaces of the Son of Heaven and Lords are often imagined to be a castle in the sky.
