= Chinese classics =

Classic texts of Chinese literature

- Traditional Chinese: 中國古籍 (Chinese: 中国经典; pinyin: Zhōng guó jīng diǎn)
- Simplified Chinese: 中国古籍
Transcriptions
Standard Mandarin
- Hanyu Pinyin: Zhōngguó gǔjí

The Chinese classics or canonical texts are the works of Chinese literature authored prior to the establishment of the imperial Qin dynasty in 221 BC. Prominent examples include the Four Books and Five Classics in the Neo-Confucian tradition, themselves an abridgment of the Thirteen Classics. The Chinese classics used a form of written Chinese consciously imitated by later authors, now known as Classical Chinese. A common Chinese word for "classic" (經; 经; jīng) literally means 'warp thread', in reference to the techniques by which works of this period were bound into volumes.

Texts may include shi (史, 'histories') zi (子 'master texts'), philosophical treatises usually associated with an individual and later systematized into schools of thought but also including works on agriculture, medicine, mathematics, astronomy, divination, art criticism, and other miscellaneous writings) and ji (集 'literary works') as well as the cultivation of jing, 'essence' in Chinese medicine.

In the Ming and Qing dynasties, the Four Books and Five Classics were the subjects of mandatory study by those Confucian scholars who wished to take the imperial examination and needed to pass them in order to become scholar-officials. Any political discussion was full of references to this background, and one could not become part of the literati—or even a military officer in some periods—without having memorized them. Generally, children first memorized the Chinese characters of the Three Character Classic and Hundred Family Surnames and they then went on to memorize the other classics. The literate elite therefore shared a common culture and set of values.

== Qin dynasty ==
=== Loss of texts ===
According to Sima Qian's Records of the Grand Historian, after Qin Shi Huang, the first emperor of China, unified China in 221 BC, his chancellor Li Si suggested suppressing intellectual discourse to unify thought and political opinion. This was alleged to have destroyed philosophical treatises of the Hundred Schools of Thought, with the goal of strengthening the official Qin governing philosophy of Legalism. According to the Shiji, three categories of books were viewed by Li Si to be most dangerous politically. These were poetry, history (especially historical records of other states than Qin), and philosophy. The ancient collection of poetry and historical records contained many stories concerning the ancient virtuous rulers. Li Si believed that if the people were to read these works they were likely to invoke the past and become dissatisfied with the present. The reason for opposing various schools of philosophy was that they advocated political ideas often incompatible with the totalitarian regime.

Modern historians doubt the details of the story, which first appeared more than a century later. Regarding the alleged Qin objective of strengthening Legalism, the traditional account is anachronistic in that Legalism was not yet a defined category of thought during the Qin period, and the "schools of thought" model is no longer considered to be an accurate portrayal of the intellectual history of pre-imperial China. Michael Nylan observes that despite its mythic significance, the "burning of books and burying of scholars" legend does not bear close scrutiny. Nylan suggests that the reason Han dynasty scholars charged the Qin with destroying the Confucian Five Classics was partly to "slander" the state they defeated and partly because Han scholars misunderstood the nature of the texts, for it was only after the founding of the Han that Sima Qian labeled the Five Classics as Confucian. Nylan also points out that the Qin court appointed classical scholars who were specialists on the Classic of Poetry and the Book of Documents, which meant that these texts would have been exempted, and that the Book of Rites and the Zuo Zhuan did not contain the glorification of defeated feudal states which the First Emperor gave as his reason for destroying them. Nylan further suggests that the story might be based on the fact that the Qin palace was razed in 207 BC and many books were undoubtedly lost at that time. Martin Kern adds that Qin and early Han writings frequently cite the Classics, especially the Documents and the Classic of Poetry, which would not have been possible if they had been burned, as reported.

== Western Han dynasty ==
=== Five Classics ===
The Five Classics (五經; Wǔjīng) are five pre-Qin texts that became part of the state-sponsored curriculum during the Western Han dynasty, which adopted Confucianism as its official ideology. It was during this period that the texts first began to be considered together as a set collection, and to be called collectively the "Five Classics". Several of the texts were already prominent by the Warring States period, but the literature culture at the time did not lend itself to clear boundaries between works, so a high degree of variance between individual witnesses of the same title was common, as well as considerable intertextuality and cognate chapters between different titles. Mencius, the leading Confucian scholar of the time, regarded the Spring and Autumn Annals as being equally important as the semi-legendary chronicles of earlier periods.

Classic of Poetry
A collection of 305 poems divided into 160 folk songs, 105 festal songs sung at court ceremonies, and 40 hymns and eulogies sung at sacrifices to heroes and ancestral spirits of the royal house.
Book of Documents
A collection of documents and speeches alleged to have been written by rulers and officials of the early Zhou period and before. It is possibly the oldest Chinese narrative, and may date from the 6th century BC. It includes examples of early Chinese prose.
Book of Rites
Describes ancient rites, social forms and court ceremonies. The version studied today is a re-worked version compiled by scholars in the third century BC rather than the original text, which is said to have been edited by Confucius himself.
I Ching
The book contains a divination system comparable to Western geomancy or the West African Ifá system. In Western cultures and modern East Asia, it is still widely used for this purpose.
Spring and Autumn Annals
A historical record of the State of Lu, Confucius's native state, 722–481 BC.

Up to the Western Han, authors would typically list the Classics in the order Poems-Documents-Rituals-Changes-Spring and Autumn. However, from the Eastern Han the default order instead became Changes-Documents-Poems-Rituals-Spring and Autumn.

=== Han imperial library ===
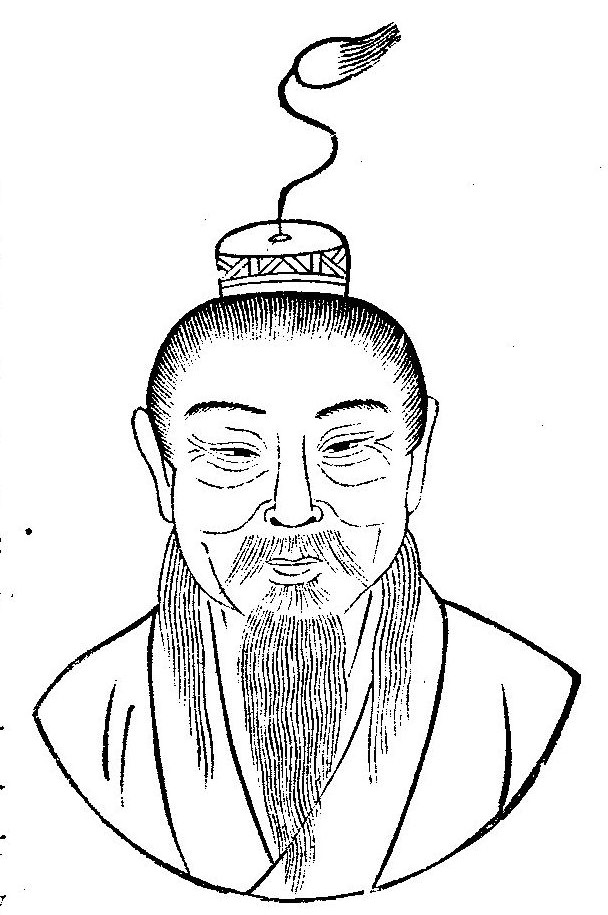
The Han-era scholar Liu Xiang edited the text of many Chinese classical works such as the Book of Rites, and compiled the Biographies of Exemplary Women.

In 26 BCE, at the command of the emperor, Liu Xiang (77–6 BC) compiled the first catalog of the imperial library, the Abstracts (別錄; 别录; Bielu), and is the first known editor of the Classic of Mountains and Seas, which was finished by his son. Liu also edited collections of stories and biographies, the Biographies of Exemplary Women. He has long erroneously been credited with compiling the Biographies of the Immortals, a collection of Taoist hagiographies and hymns. Liu Xiang was also a poet, being credited with the "Nine Laments" that appears in the Chu Ci.

The works edited and compiled by Liu Xiang include:

- Book of Documents
- Classic of Rites
- Classic of Filial Piety
- Yi Zhou Shu
- Strategies of the Warring States
- Analects
- Xunzi
- Shenzi
- Zhuangzi
- Liezi
- Huainanzi
- Guanzi
- Yanzi Chunqiu
- Shuoyuan (initial compilation)
- Xinxu (新序; New Prefaces) (authorship)

This work was continued by his son, Liu Xin, who finally completed the task after his father's death. The transmitted corpus of these classical texts all derives from the versions edited down by Liu Xiang and Liu Xin. Michael Nylan has characterised the scope of the Liu pair's editing as having been so vast that it affects our understanding of China's pre-imperial period to the same degree as the Qin unification does.

== Song dynasty ==
=== Four Books ===
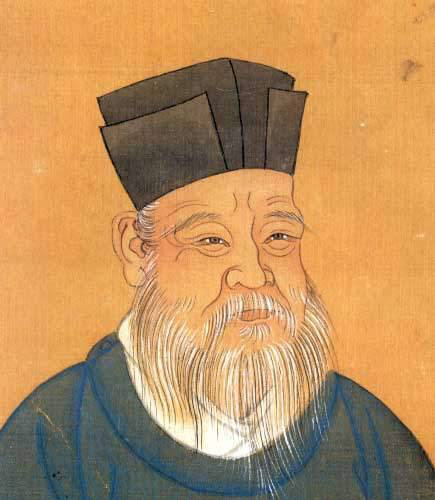
Zhu Xi selected the list of four books in the Song dynasty.

The Four Books (四書; Sìshū) are texts illustrating the core value and belief systems in Confucianism. They were selected by Zhu Xi (1130–1200) during the Song dynasty to serve as general introduction to Confucian thought, and they were, in the Ming and Qing dynasties, made the core of the official curriculum for the civil service examinations. They are:

Great Learning
Originally one chapter in the Book of Rites. It consists of a short main text attributed to Confucius and nine commentary chapters by Zengzi, one of the disciples of Confucius. Its importance is illustrated by Zengzi's foreword that this is the gateway of learning. It is significant because it expresses many themes of Chinese philosophy and political thinking, and has therefore been extremely influential both in classical and modern Chinese thought. Government, self-cultivation and investigation of things are linked.

Doctrine of the Mean
Another chapter in Book of Rites, attributed to Confucius's grandson Zisi. The purpose of this small, 33-chapter book is to demonstrate the usefulness of a golden way to gain perfect virtue. It focuses on the Tao that is prescribed by a heavenly mandate not only to the ruler but to everyone. To follow these heavenly instructions by learning and teaching will automatically result in a Confucian virtue of de. Because Heaven has laid down what is the way to perfect virtue, it is not that difficult to follow the steps of the holy rulers of old if one only knows what is the right way.

Analects
Thought to be a compilation of speeches by Confucius and his disciples, as well as the discussions they held. Since Confucius's time, the Analects has heavily influenced the philosophy and moral values of China and later other East Asian countries as well. The imperial examinations, started in the Sui dynasty and eventually abolished with the founding of the Republic of China, emphasized Confucian studies and expected candidates to quote and apply the words of Confucius in their essays.

Mencius
A collection of conversations of the scholar Mencius with kings of his time. In contrast to the sayings of Confucius, which are short and self-contained, the Mencius consists of long dialogues with extensive prose.

== Ming dynasty ==
=== Thirteen Classics ===
The official curriculum of the imperial examination system from the Song dynasty onward are the Thirteen Classics. In total, these works total to more than 600,000 characters that must be memorized in order to pass the examination. Moreover, these works are accompanied by extensive commentary and annotation, containing approximately 300 million characters by some estimates.

- I Ching
- Book of Documents
- Classic of Poetry
- The Three Ritual Classics (三禮; Sānlǐ)
  - Rites of Zhou
  - Ceremonies and Rites
  - Book of Rites
    - "Great Learning" chapter (大學; Dà xué)
    - "Doctrine of the Mean" chapter (中庸; Zhōng yōng)
- The Three Commentaries on the Spring and Autumn Annals
  - Zuo Zhuan
  - The Commentary of Gongyang
  - The Commentary of Guliang
- Analects
- Classic of Filial Piety
- Erya
- Mencius

== List of classics ==
=== Before 221 BC ===
It is often difficult or impossible to precisely date pre-Qin works beyond determining that they are "pre-Qin", a period of 1000 years. Information in ancient China was often by oral tradition and passed down from generations before so was rarely written down, so the older the composition of the texts may not be in a chronological order as that which was arranged and presented by their attributed "authors".

The below list is therefore organized in the order which is found in the Siku Quanshu (Complete Library of the Four Treasuries), the encyclopedic collation of the works found in the imperial library of the Qing dynasty under the Qianlong Emperor. The Siku Quanshu classifies all works into 4 top-level branches: the Confucian Classics and their secondary literature; history; philosophy; and poetry. There are sub-categories within each branch, but due to the small number of pre-Qin works in the Classics, History and Poetry branches, the sub-categories are only reproduced for the Philosophy branch.

==== Classics branch ====
Title	Description
I Ching	A manual of divination based on the eight trigrams attributed to the mythical figure Fuxi—by at least the Eastern Zhou, these eight trigrams had been multiplied to create 64 hexagrams.
Book of Documents	A collection of documents and speeches allegedly from the Xia, Shang and Western Zhou periods, and even earlier. It contains some of the earliest examples of Chinese prose.
Classic of Poetry	Made up of 305 poems divided into 160 folk songs, 74 minor festal songs, traditionally sung at court festivities, 31 major festal songs, sung at more solemn court ceremonies, and 40 hymns and eulogies, sung at sacrifices to gods and ancestral spirits of the royal house. This book is traditionally credited as a compilation edited by Confucius. A standard version, named Maoshi Zhengyi, was compiled in the mid-7th century under the leadership of Kong Yingda.
The Three Rites	
Rites of Zhou	Conferred the status of a classic in the 12th century, in place of the lost Classic of Music.
Book of Etiquette and Ceremony	Describes ancient rites, social forms and court ceremonies.
Classic of Rites	Describes social forms, administration, and ceremonial rites.
Spring and Autumn Annals	Chronologically the earliest of the annals; comprising about 16,000 characters, it records the events of the state of Lu from 722 to 481 BC, with implied condemnation of usurpations, murder, incest, etc.
Zuo zhuan	A different report of the same events as the Spring and Autumn Annals with a few significant differences. It covers a longer period than the Spring and Autumn Annals.
Commentary of Gongyang	Another surviving commentary on the same events (see Spring and Autumn Annals).
Commentary of Guliang	Another surviving commentary on the same events (see Spring and Autumn Annals).
Classic of Filial Piety	A small book giving advice on filial piety; how to behave towards a senior (such as a father, an elder brother, or ruler).
The Four Books	
Mencius	A book of anecdotes and conversations of Mencius.
Analects	A twenty-chapter work of dialogues attributed to Confucius and his disciples; traditionally believed to have been written by Confucius's own circle it is thought to have been set down by later Confucian scholars.
Doctrine of the Mean	A chapter from the Book of Rites made into an independent work by Zhu Xi
Great Learning	A chapter from the Book of Rites made into an independent work by Zhu Xi
Philology	
Erya	A dictionary explaining the meaning and interpretation of words in the context of the Confucian Canon.

==== History branch ====
Title	Description
Bamboo Annals	History of Zhou dynasty excavated from a Wei tomb in the Jin dynasty.
Yi Zhou Shu	Similar in style to the Book of Documents
Guoyu	A collection of historical records of numerous states recorded the period from the Western Zhou to 453 BC.
Strategies of the Warring States	Edited by Liu Xiang.
Yanzi chunqiu	Attributed to the statesman Yan Ying, a contemporary of Confucius

==== Philosophy branch ====
The philosophical typology of individual pre-imperial texts has in every case been applied retroactively, rather than consciously within the text itself. The categorization of works of these genera has been highly contentious, especially in modern times. Many modern scholars reject the continued usefulness of this model as a heuristic for understanding the shape of the intellectual landscape of the time.

Title	Description
Confucianism (excluding Classics branch)	
Kongzi Jiayu	Collection of stories about Confucius and his disciples. Authenticity disputed.
Xunzi	Attributed to Xun Kuang, an ancient Chinese collection of philosophical writings that makes the distinction between what is born in man and what must be learned through rigorous education.
Seven Military Classics	
Six Secret Teachings	Attributed to Jiang Ziya
The Art of War	Attributed to Sunzi.
Wuzi	Attributed to Wu Qi.
The Methods of the Sima	Attributed to Sima Rangju.
Wei Liaozi	Attributed to Wei Liao.
Three Strategies of Huang Shigong	Attributed to Jiang Ziya.
Thirty-Six Stratagems	Recently recovered.
Legalism	
Guanzi	Attributed to Guan Zhong.
Deng Xizi	Fragment
The Book of Lord Shang	Attributed to Shang Yang.
Han Feizi	Attributed to Han Fei.
Shenzi	Attributed to Shen Buhai. All but one chapter is lost.
Canon of Laws	Attributed to Li Kui.
Medicine	
Huangdi Neijing	
Nan Jing	
Miscellaneous	
Yuzi	Fragment
Mozi	Attributed to Mozi.
Yinwenzi	Fragment
Shenzi	Attributed to Shen Dao. It originally consisted of ten volumes and forty-two chapters, of which all but seven chapters have been lost.
Heguanzi	
Gongsun longzi	
Guiguzi	
Lüshi Chunqiu	An encyclopedia of ancient classics edited by Lü Buwei.
Shizi	Attributed to Shi Jiao
Mythology	
Classic of Mountains and Seas	A compilation of early geography descriptions of animals and myths from various locations around China.
Tale of King Mu, Son of Heaven	tells the tale of king mu and his quest for immortality and after receiving it sadness over the death of his lover.
Taoism	
Tao Te Ching	Attributed to Laozi.
Guan Yinzi	Fragment
Liezi	Attributed to Lie Yukou.
Zhuangzi	Attributed to Zhuang Zhou.
Wenzi	

==== Poetry ====
Title	Description
Chu Ci	Aside from the Shi Jing (see Classics branch) the only surviving pre-Qin poetry collection. Attributed to the southern state of Chu, and especially Qu Yuan.

=== After 206 BC ===
- The Twenty-Four Histories, a collection of authoritative histories of China for various dynasties:
  - The Records of the Grand Historian by Sima Qian
  - The Book of Han by Ban Gu.
  - The Book of Later Han by Fan Ye
  - The Records of Three Kingdoms by Chen Shou
  - The Book of Jin by Fang Xuanling
  - The Book of Song by Shen Yue
  - The Book of Southern Qi by Xiao Zixian
  - The Book of Liang by Yao Silian
  - The Book of Chen by Yao Silian
  - The History of the Southern Dynasties by Li Yanshou
  - The Book of Wei by Wei Shou
  - The Book of Zhou by Linghu Defen
  - The Book of Northern Qi by Li Baiyao
  - The History of the Northern Dynasties by Li Yanshou
  - The Book of Sui by Wei Zheng
  - The Old Book of Tang by Liu Xu
  - The New Book of Tang by Ouyang Xiu
  - The Old History of Five Dynasties by Xue Juzheng
  - The New History of Five Dynasties by Ouyang Xiu
  - The History of Song by Toqto'a
  - The History of Liao by Toqto'a
  - The History of Jin by Toqto'a
  - The History of Yuan by Song Lian
  - The History of Ming by Zhang Tingyu
  - The Draft History of Qing by Zhao Erxun is usually referred as the 25th classic of history records
  - The New History of Yuan by Ke Shaomin is sometimes referred as the 26th classic of history records
- The Chronicles of Huayang, an old record of ancient history and tales of southwestern China, attributed to Chang Qu.
- The Biographies of Exemplary Women, a biographical collection of exemplary women in ancient China, compiled by Liu Xiang.
- The Spring and Autumn Annals of the Sixteen Kingdoms, a historical record of the Sixteen Kingdoms, attributed to Cui Hong, is lost.
- The Shiming, is a dictionary compiled by Liu Xi by the end of 2nd century.
- A New Account of the Tales of the World, a collection of historical anecdotes and character sketches of some 600 literati, musicians, and painters.
- The Thirty-Six Strategies, a military strategy book attributed to Tan Daoji.
- The Literary Mind and the Carving of Dragons, a review book on ancient Chinese literature and writings by Liu Xie.
- The Commentary on the Water Classic, a book on hydrology of rivers in China attributed to the great geographer Li Daoyuan.
- The Dialogues between Li Jing and Tang Taizong, a military strategy book attributed to Li Jing
- The Zizhi Tongjian, with Sima Guang as its main editor.
- The Spring and Autumn Annals of Wu and Yue, a historical record of the states of Wu and Yue during the Spring and Autumn period, attributed to Zhao Ye.
- The Zhenguan Zhengyao, a record of governance strategies and leadership of Emperor Taizong of Tang, attributed to Wu Jing.
- The Jiaoshi Yilin, a work modeled after the I Ching, composed during the Western Han dynasty and attributed to Jiao Yanshou.
- The Nine Chapters on the Mathematical Art, a mathematics Chinese book composed by several generations scholars of Han dynasty.
- The Thousand Character Classic, attributed to Zhou Xingsi.
- The Treatise on Astrology of the Kaiyuan Era, compiled by Gautama Siddha, is a Chinese encyclopedia on astrology and divination.
- The Shitong, written by Liu Zhiji, a work on historiography.
- The Tongdian, written by Du You, a contemporary text focused on the Tang dynasty.
- The Tang Huiyao, compiled by Wang Pu, a text based on the institutional history of the Tang dynasty.
- The Great Tang Records on the Western Regions, compiled by Bianji; a recount of Xuanzang's journey.
- The Miscellaneous Morsels from Youyang, written by Duan Chengshi, records fantastic stories, anecdotes, and exotic customs.
- The Four Great Books of Song, a term referring to the four large compilations during the beginning of Song dynasty:
  - The Taiping Yulan, a leishu encyclopedia.
  - The Taiping Guangji, a collection of folk tales and theology.
  - The Wenyuan Yinghua, an anthology of poetry, odes, songs and other writings.
  - The Cefu Yuangui, a leishu encyclopedia of political essays, autobiographies, memorials and decrees.
- The Dream Pool Essays, a collection of essays on science, technology, military strategies, history, politics, music and arts, written by Shen Kuo.
- The Tiangong Kaiwu, an encyclopedia compiled by Song Yingxing.
- The Compendium of Materia Medica, a classic book of medicine written by Li Shizhen.
- The Complete Library of the Four Treasuries, the largest compilation of literature in Chinese history.
- The New Songs from the Jade Terrace, a poetry collection from the Six Dynasties period.
- The Complete Tang Poems, compiled during the Qing dynasty, published in 1705.
- The Xiaolin Guangji, a collection of jokes compiled during the Qing dynasty.

=== See also ===
- List of early Chinese texts
- Kaicheng Stone Classics
- Old Text School
