= Kaicheng Stone Classics =

Group of early Chinese classic works

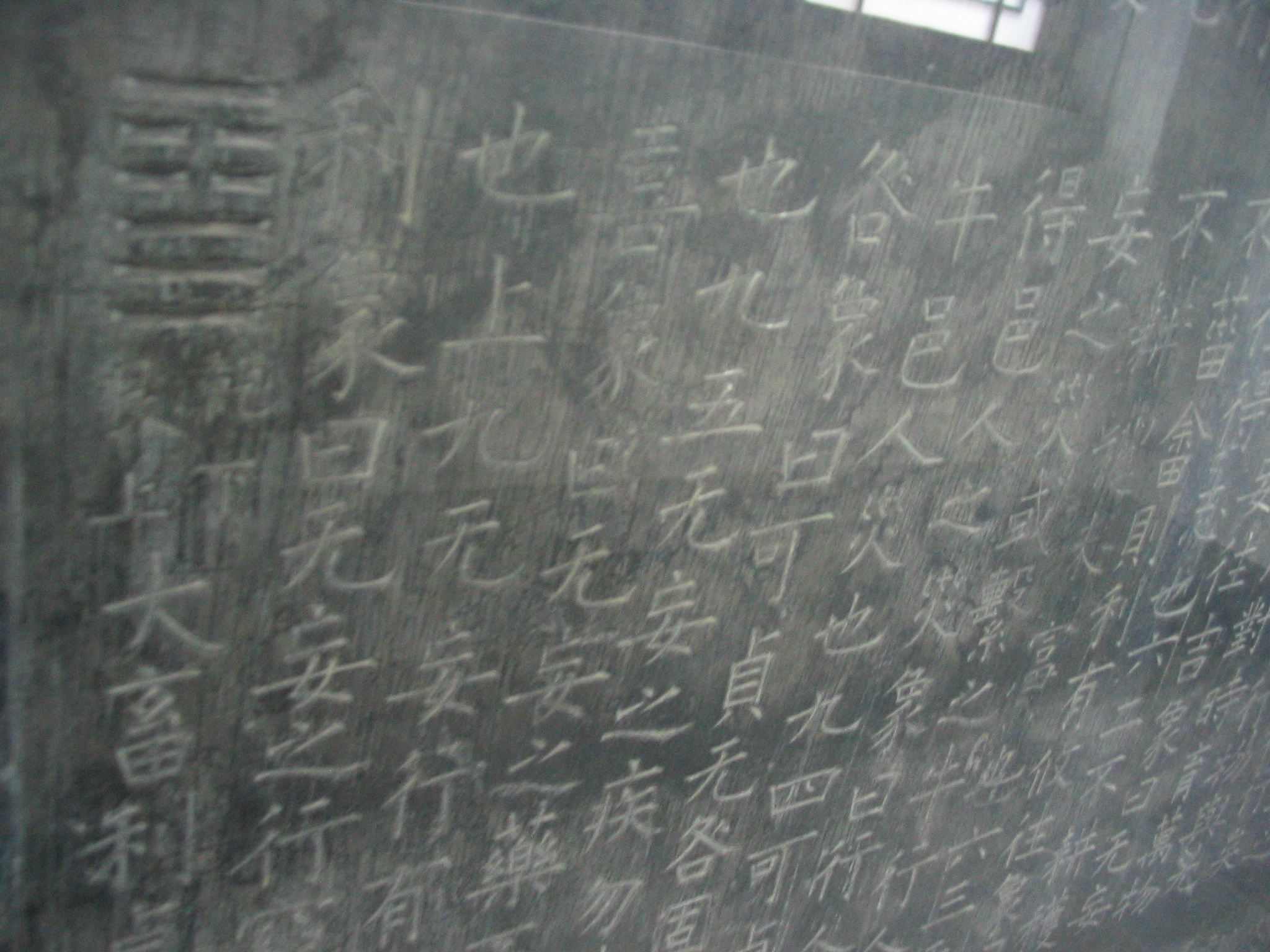
Part of the Classic of Changes carved into stone in Stele Forest Museum, Xi'an.

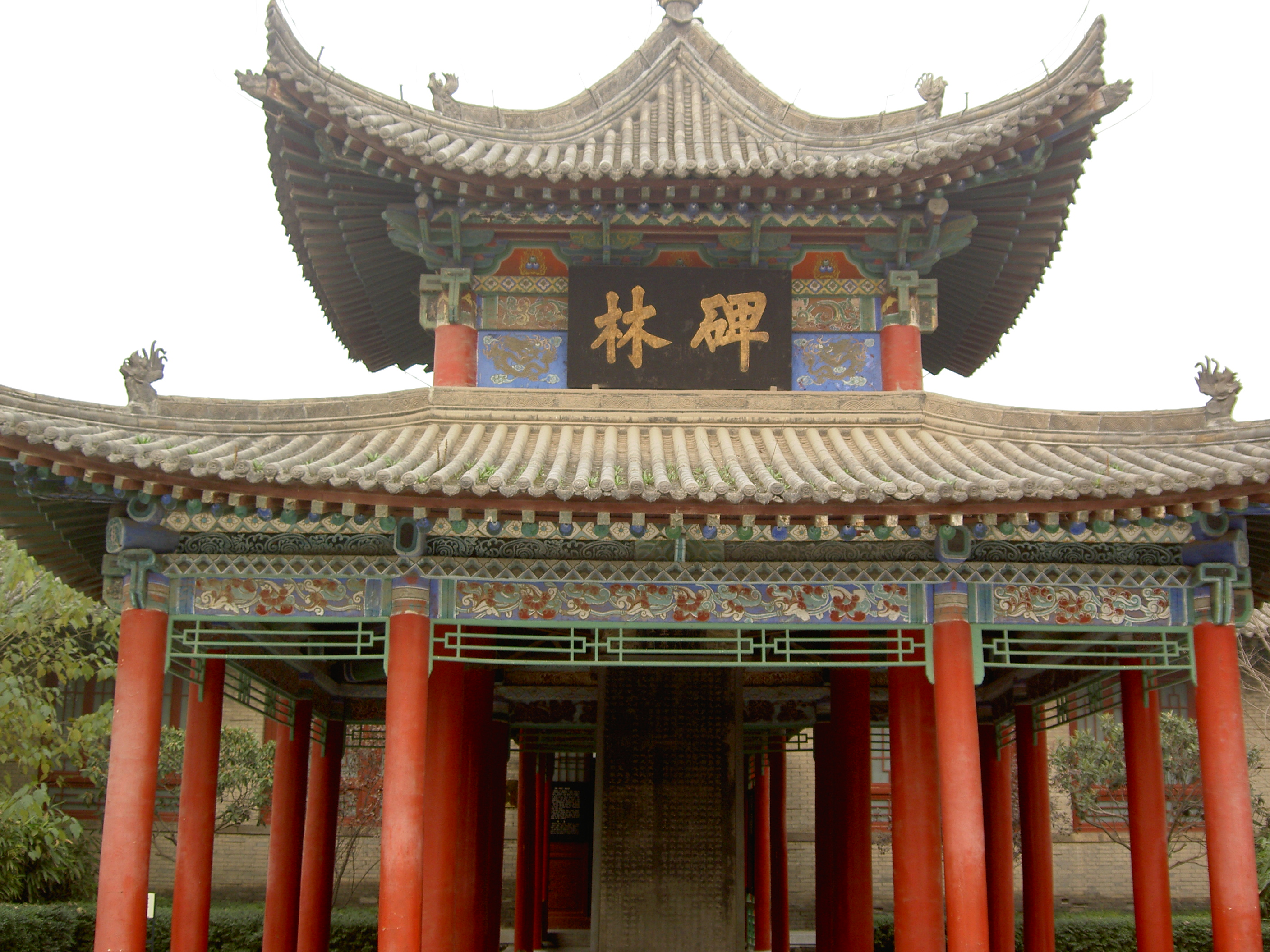
Stele Forest Museum in Xi'an, housing the Stone Classics

The Kaicheng Stone Classics (Kaicheng shijing 開成石經) or Tang Stone Classics are a group of twelve early Chinese classic works carved on the orders of Emperor Wenzong of the Tang dynasty in 833–837 (Kaicheng era) as a reference document for scholars. The works recorded are:

- Book of Changes or I Ching (易經 Yìjīng)
- Book of Documents (書經 Shūjīng)
- Book of Songs (詩經 Shījīng)
- Rites of Zhou (周禮 Zhōulǐ, originally part of the Book of Rites)
- Ceremonies and Rites (儀禮 Yílǐ, originally part of the Book of Rites)
- Book of Rites (禮記 Lǐjì)
- The Commentary of Zuo (左傳 Zuǒzhuàn) on the Spring and Autumn Annals
- The Commentary of Gongyang (公羊傳 Gōngyáng Zhuàn) on the Spring and Autumn Annals
- The Commentary of Guliang (穀梁傳 Gǔliáng Zhuàn) on the Spring and Autumn Annals
- The Analects (論語 Lúnyǔ)
- Classic of Filial Piety (孝經 Xiàojīng)
- Erya (爾雅 Ěryǎ)

The classics, with more than 650,000 characters engraved double-sided on 114 stone tablets, are preserved in the Stele Forest Museum in Xi'an, China. Widely regarded as the world's heaviest books, these tablets are also among the most complete copies of these key documents of Chinese culture to ever have existed.

== Other stone Confucian classics ==
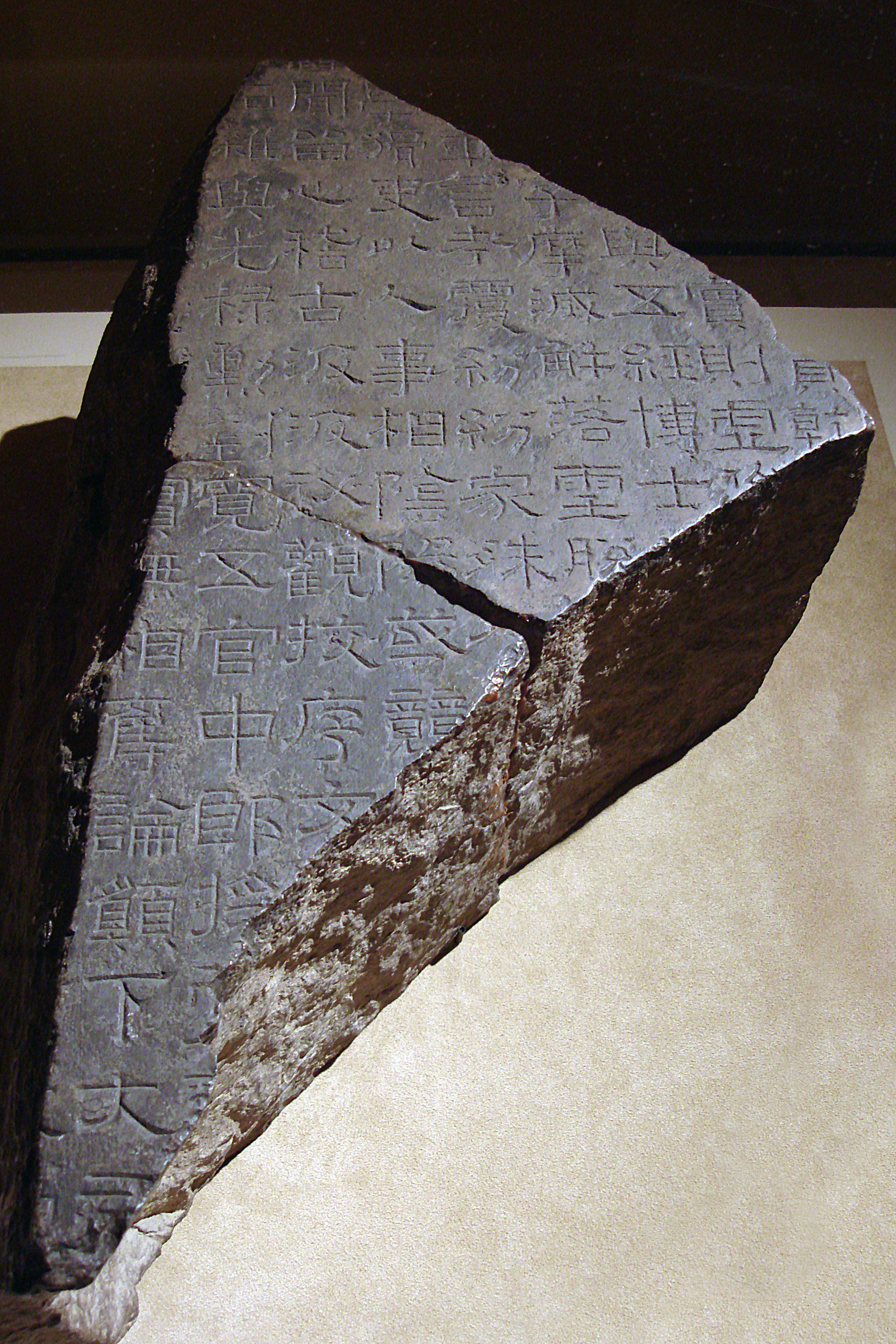
Fragment of the Xiping Stone Classics

The Confucian classics have been engraved on stone tablets several times. The Xiping Stone Classics or Han Stone Classics were set up at the Imperial Academy outside Luoyang in 175–183. Around 200,000 characters were inscribed on 46 stelae, comprising the text of the seven classics recognized at the time: the Book of Changes, Book of Documents, Book of Songs, Book of Rites, Spring and Autumn Annals, Classic of Filial Piety and Analects. Only a few fragments of these tablets have survived. The Zhengshi Stone Classics in 241 recorded three classics in three scripts, but these have since disappeared.

Later stone classics are Guangzheng (廣政) (944), Jiayou (嘉祐) (1061) and Taixue (1131). During the Song dynasty, the Mencius was also recognized as part of the Confucian canon, making thirteen classic works. It was also included in tablets engraved in 1789 during the reign of the Qianlong Emperor in the Qing dynasty, adding a further 30,000 characters on 17 tablets. The complete set of 190 tablets containing over 630,000 characters is kept in the Beijing Temple of Confucius.
