= Luoyang Museum =

Museum

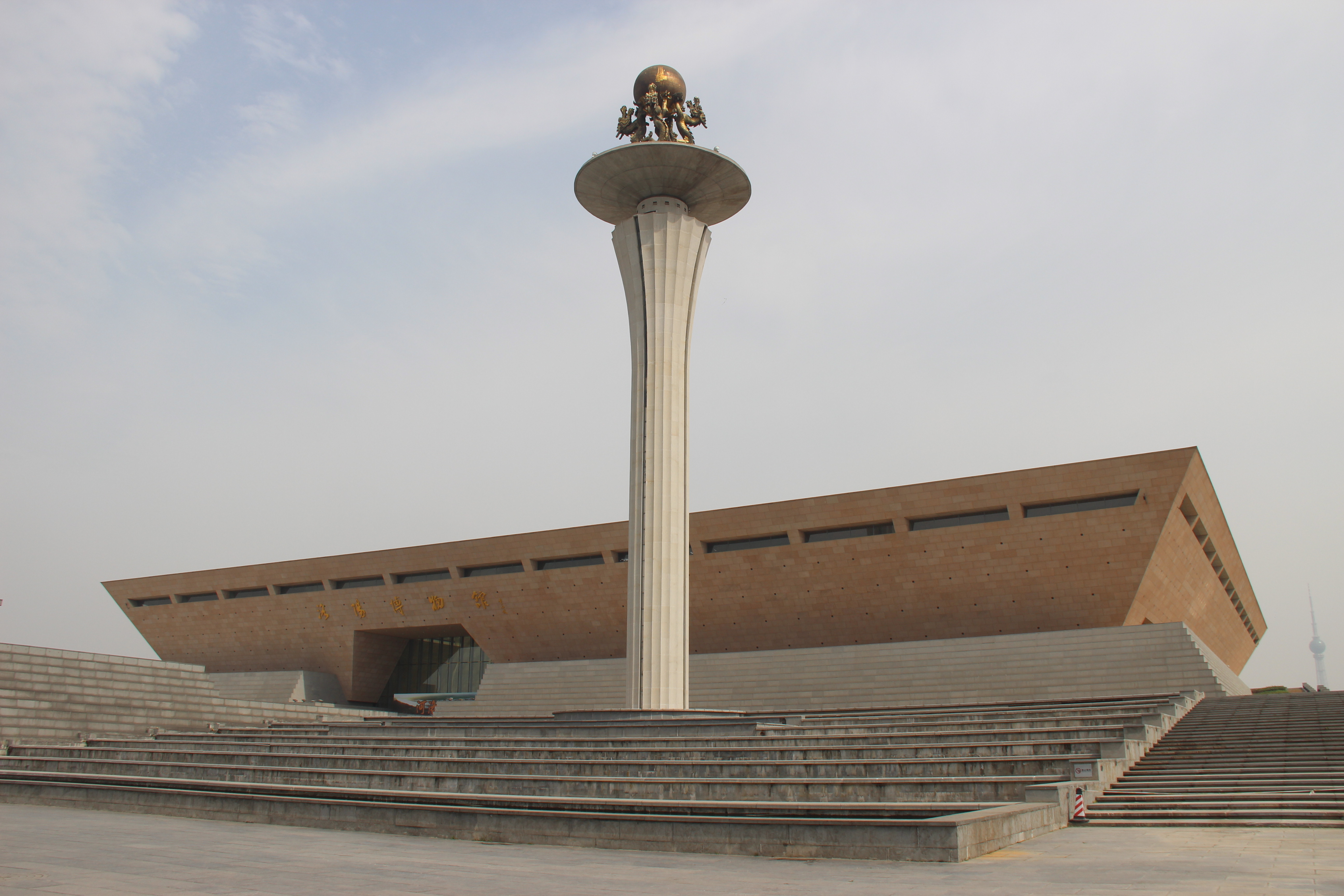
- Luoyang Museum

- Location within China
- Established: 1958, 1974
- Location: Nietai Road, Luoyang, Henan, China
- Coordinates: 34.6635°N 112.4601°E
- Collection size: 1700
- Website: http://www.lymuseum.com/

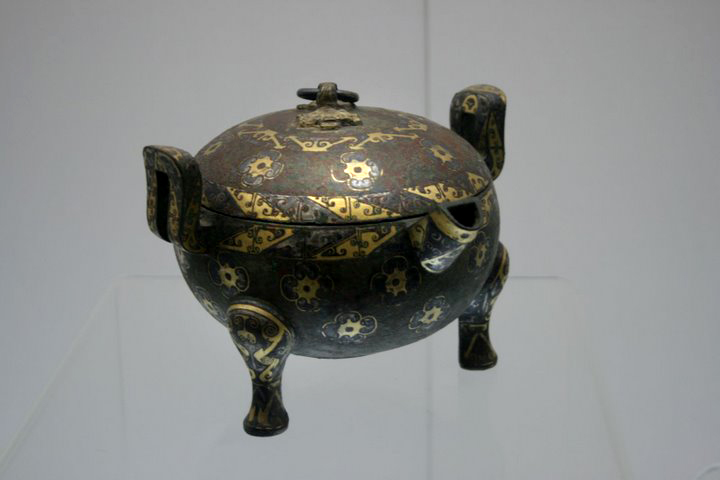
Chinese bronze ding vessel with gold and silver inlay from the Warring States Period (403–221 BC) of ancient China.

Luoyang Museum (Chinese: 洛阳博物馆; pinyin: Luòyáng Bówùguǎn) is a historical museum in Luoyang, Henan Province, China. Situated in the Yellow River valley. It offers exhibits of the rich cultural heritage of Luoyang, a major Chinese cultural centre, which was the capital of several Chinese dynasties including the Eastern Zhou and the Eastern Han.

The museum was first built in 1958, in Guanlin, seven kilometres (4.3 mi) south of Luoyang City. It was moved to the north side of Zhongzhou Road in 1973 near the Wangcheng Park, which, at an area of 67 hectares (170 acres), is the largest public park in Luoyang. The new museum opened on May 1, 1974. It houses relics from excavation sites on the outskirts of Luoyang, in the city's old section. They include antiquaries from palaces and temples. These artifacts establish the historical past of Luoyang, representing elements of the ancient city of nine capitals, from Neolithic times up to 937 AD.

== Architecture and fittings ==
The museum is built in ancient Tang dynasty, Chinese architectural style. An Eastern Han dynasty painting of the "hundred-flower" lantern is displayed on the front facade of the museum.

With four display halls and five exhibition rooms, it is spread over 20,000 square metres (220,000 sq ft) with a floor space of 10,000 square metres (110,000 sq ft). The antiquaries are arranged to demonstrate the evolution of social structure, beginning with primitive society in the first hall, followed by exhibits related to slavery, and feudalism. The exhibits are also arranged in a sequence of ancient cultures starting with Heluo, followed by Yangshao, Longshan, Xia (21st century BC – 17th century BC), Shang (17th century BC – 11th century BC) and ending with Zhou (11th century BC – 256 BC).

== Exhibits ==
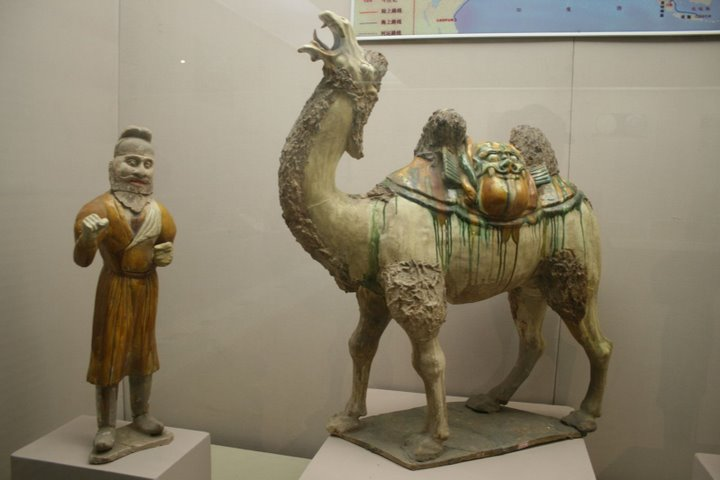
Tang dynasty sancai pottery of camel and man

Two collections are major permanent exhibits: the Historical and Cultural Relics of Luoyang and the Selected Cultural Relics of Luoyang. Travelling collections from the Luoyang Museum are located in Japan, Germany, France, Singapore and South Korea. In addition, the museum also conducts exhibitions of carved stone, Pottery figurines of Han and Tang dynasties, cultural relic of ancient Chinese Palace, calligraphy and paintings, and other items every year.

Many of the exhibits are of bronze, pottery, porcelain, gold, silver, jade and stone wares. In addition, the Ming and Qing dynasty articles include ancient calligraphic works and paintings, and folk art objects.

Pieces include:

- Stone Age figurines and implements of Tang dynasty
- A figurine of a young woman with coiled hair excavated in 1980
- A young woman figurine in clay with dragon design headgear
- An imperial attendant at the Jingling Mausoleum of Ziyou, the Emperor Xiaozhuang of Northern Wei dynasty (314 centimetres (124 in))
- An imperial attendant at the Jingling Mausoleum of Yuan Ke, the Emperor Xuanwu of Northern Wei dynasty (289 cm (114 in)).

There are also items excavated at Erlitou, an important site 30 metres (98 ft) east of Luoyang. These include jade, bronzes, and pottery artifacts of the Xia and Shang dynasties. A winged bronze figure with gold inlay measuring 15.5 centimetres (6.1 in) by 9.5 centimetres (3.7 in) from the Eastern Han dynasty was secured from a tomb on the outskirts of Luoyong and represents a three-dimensional sculpture of an enlightened person. Three relics from the earliest Buddhist Yongning Temple built in 519 under the Northern Wei dynasty reign, and a figure painted in clay unearthed from the base of the Yongning Temple are also part of the collection.

Of the mingqi items excavated in 1972 from a nearby Western Han tomb, a house-like kitchen and 190 pottery articles are a part of the museum collection. There are two epitaph tablets that record the construction of the Gongling mausoleum of Li Hong.

== Research and training ==
The museum also functions as a centre for research and training.
