= Xiping Stone Classics =

Stone carved books of the Confucian classics (175–183)

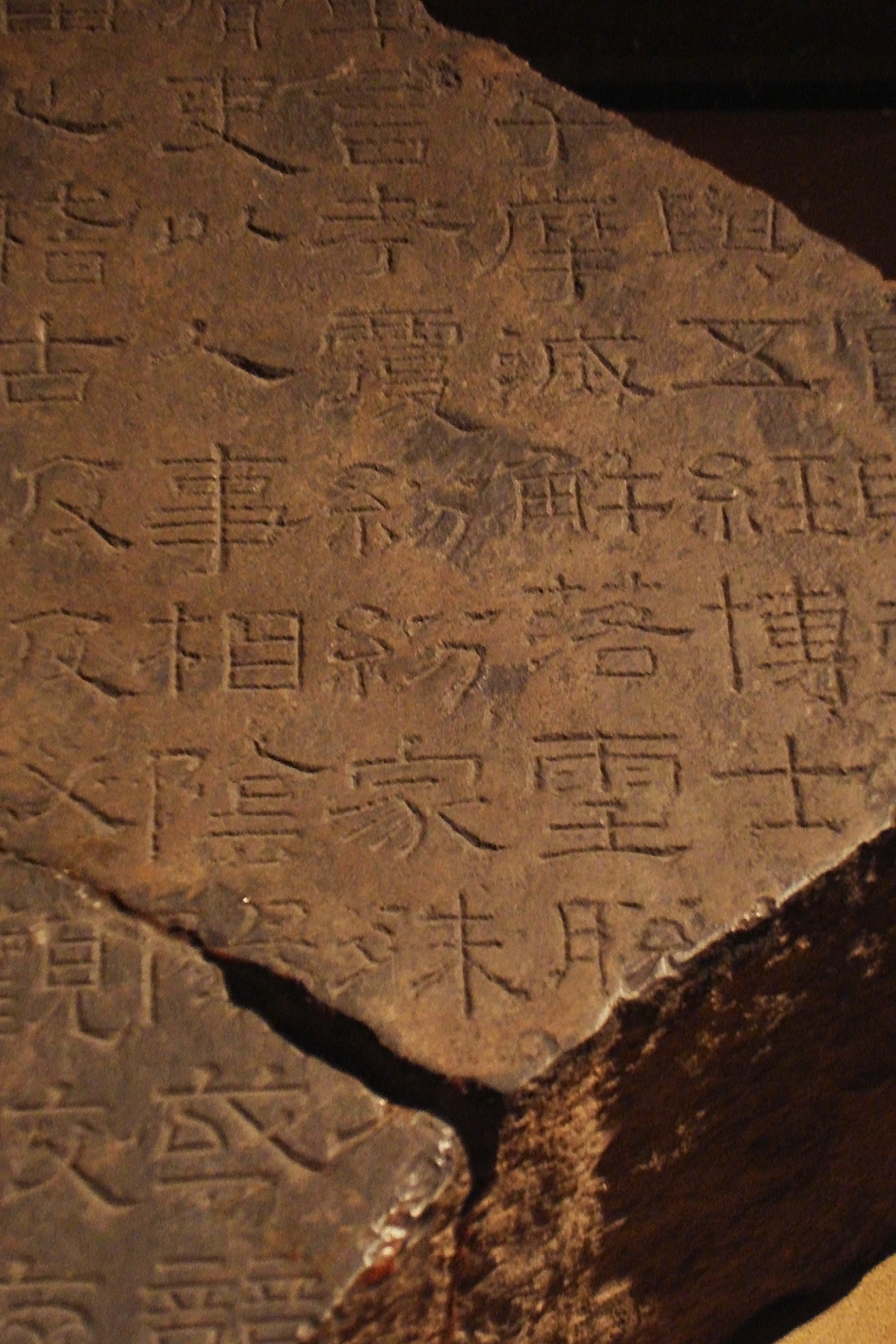
A fragment of the Xiping Stone Classics

The Xiping Stone Classics (Chinese: 熹平石經) are a collection of Han dynasty stone carved books on various Confucian classics. Named for the Xiping reign era (AD 172–178) of Emperor Ling of Han, the stone classics were carved over an eight-year period from AD 175 to 183 into stone stelae set up at the Imperial Academy outside Luoyang. The project was overseen by Cai Yong and a group of affiliated scholars who "petitioned the emperor to have the Confucian classics carved in stone in order to prevent their being altered to support particular points of view."

The stelae contained 200,000 characters across 46 stelae, and covered the seven classics recognized at the time: the Book of Changes, Book of Documents, Book of Songs, Book of Rites, Spring and Autumn Annals, Classic of Filial Piety and Analects. Each stele was about 2.5 metres (8.2 ft) high and 1 metre (3.3 ft) wide. Cai and other scholars like Ma Midi, Han Yue (韓說), Lu Zhi, Tangxi Dian (堂谿典), Yang Ci (楊賜) and his son Yang Biao (楊彪), Zhang Xun (張馴), Li Xun (李巡), and Zhao You (趙祐), Shan Yang (單颺) would write text onto the stone using cinnabar, which was then engraved. When completed, 28 stela containing the Changes, History, Chunqiu, and the Gongyang commentary, were arranged on the western side of a roughly "U" form. The 15 stela with the Ritual, including the names of Cai Yong and Ma Midi, were placed on the southern side, while the 5 stela containing the Analects were on the eastern side. Scholars could then take rubbings, besides studying the texts.

The stelae were mostly destroyed in the fighting following the collapse of the Han dynasty, and only a few fragments have survived.

== See also ==
- Kaicheng Stone Classics
