= Etiquette and Ceremonial =

Literary work

Chinese name
- Traditional Chinese: 儀禮
- Simplified Chinese: 仪礼
- Literal meaning: ceremonies [and] rites
Transcriptions
Standard Mandarin
- Hanyu Pinyin: Yílǐ
- Wade–Giles: I-li
Middle Chinese
- Middle Chinese: /ŋˠiᴇ lei^{X}/
Old Chinese
- Zhengzhang: /*ŋral riːʔ/

Vietnamese name
- Vietnamese alphabet: Nghi lễ
- Chữ Hán: 儀禮

Korean name
- Hangul: 의례
- Hanja: 儀禮
Transcriptions
- Revised Romanization: Uirye

Japanese name
- Kanji: 儀礼
- Kana: ぎれい
Transcriptions
- Romanization: Girei

The Book of Etiquette and Ceremonial is a Chinese classic text about Zhou dynasty social behavior and ceremonial ritual as it was practiced and understood during the Spring and Autumn period. The Book of Etiquette and Ceremonial, along with the Rites of Zhou and the Book of Rites, formed the "Three Rites" which guided traditional Confucian understandings of propriety and behavior.

== Title ==
The modern Chinese title Yili is a compound of two words with many related meanings, leading to a variety of English translations including the Book of Etiquette and Ceremonial, Etiquette and Rites, the Ceremonies and Rites, Ceremonial and Rites, etc. Yi 儀 may mean "right", "proper", "ceremony" "demeanor", "appearance", "etiquette", "rite", "present", "gift", or "equipment". Li 禮, meanwhile, may mean "propriety", "ceremony" "rite", "ritual", "courtesy", "etiquette", "manners", or "mores".

According to some scholars (e.g. German Sinologist Alfred Forke), the text was first called the Yili in Wang Chong's treatise Lunheng (c. 80 CE); however, Xing Wen contends that "儀禮" in the original Chinese text refers the ceremonies and rites themselves, not the book. Prior to that, it was called the Rites of the Shi (士禮, Shili), the Classic of Rites (禮經, Lijing), the Old Classic of Rites (禮古經, Ligujing), or simply the Rites (禮, Li). Book of Later Han refers to this book, as 儀禮 Yílǐ, among works annotated by scholar Zheng Xuan.

== History ==
Traditional Chinese scholarship credited the text (along with the Rites of Zhou) to the 11th century BCE Duke of Zhou. Sinologist William Boltz says this tradition is "now generally recognized as untenable", but believes the extant Yili "is a remnant of "a larger corpus of similar ceremonial and ritual texts dating from pre-Han times, perhaps as early as the time of Confucius; that much of this was lost by Han", while "some may have come to be preserved in the text known today as the [Liji]". Nylan suggests that multiple strata in the text with slight differences in grammar indicate that the text was compiled over an extended period.

Many Chinese texts were irretrievably lost during Qin Shihuang's "Burning of the Books". The Book of Etiquette and Ceremonial survived in two versions: the "Old Text" supposedly discovered in the walls of Confucius's former residence, and the "New Text". The 2nd century scholar Zheng Xuan compiled an edition from both texts and wrote the first commentary. The 3rd century Wang Su wrote two commentaries and criticized Zheng, but Zheng's version became the basis for later editions and scholarship. It was among the works carved into the 837 CE Kaicheng Stone Classics and was first printed from woodblocks between 932 and 953 CE. Three fragmentary manuscripts covering more than seven chapters were discovered in 1st-century Han tombs at Wuwei in Gansu in 1959.

The first Western editions of the Book of Etiquette and Ceremonial were translations into French by Charles-Joseph de Harlez de Deulin in 1890 and Séraphin Couvreur in 1916. John Steele first translated the full text into English in 1917.

== Content ==
After disparaging the repetitive and "unnecessary detail" in the text, John Steele described it as a "picture of the public and private life, education, family interests, and work-a-day religion of an average man in the China of 3,000 years ago." It contains one of the earliest references to the Three Obediences and Four Virtues, a set of principles directed exclusively at women that formed a core part of female education during the Zhou.

The received text of the Yili contains seventeen pian 篇 "chapters; sections".

Yili Chapters
| Number | Chinese | Pinyin | Translation |
| 1 | 士冠禮 | Shiguan li | Capping rites for (the son of) a common officer |
| 2 | 士昏禮 | Shihun li | Nuptial rites for a common officer |
| 3 | zh|士相見禮 | Shi xiangjian li | Rites attendant on the meeting of common officers with each other |
| 4 | 鄉飲酒禮 | Xiang yinjiu li | Rites of the district symposium |
| 5 | 鄉射禮 | Xiang she li | Rites of the district archery meet |
| 6 | 燕禮 | Yan li | Banquet rites (at state, not imperial, level) |
| 7 | 大射 | Dashe | The great archery meet (state level) |
| 8 | 聘禮 | Pin li | Rites of courtesy calls (state to state) |
| 9 | 公食大夫禮 | Gongshi dafu li | Rites of the gong feasting a great officer |
| 10 | 覲禮 | Jin li | Rites of the (imperial) audience |
| 11 | 喪服 | Sang fu | Mourning attire |
| 12 | 士喪禮 | Shi sang li | Mourning rites for the common officer |
| 13 | 既夕禮 | Ji xi li | (Mourning procedures of) the evening preceding burial |
| 14 | 士虞禮 | Shi yu li | Post burial rites for a common officer |
| 15 | 特牲饋食禮 | Tesheng kuishi li | Rites of the single victim food offering |
| 16 | zh|少牢饋食禮 | Shaolao kuishi li | Rites of the secondary pen victim food offering |
| 17 | 有司徹 | Yousi che | The servant clearing the way |

Compared with the other ritual texts, the Etiquette and Ceremonial contains some highly detailed descriptions. Take for instance, this passage about the ceremony for the personator of the dead:

Then the host descends and washes a goblet. The personator and the aide descend also, and the host, laying the cup in the basket, declines the honor. To this the personator makes a suitable reply. When the washing is finished, they salute one another, and the personator goes up, but not the aide. Then the host fills the goblet and pledges the personator. Standing, facing north to the east of the eastern pillar, he sits down, laying down the cup, bows, the personator, to the west of the western pillar, facing north, and bowing in return. Then the host sits, offers of the wine, and drinks. When he has finished off the cup, he bows, the personator bowing in return. He then descends and washes the goblet, the personator descending and declining the honor. The host lays the cup in the basket, and making a suitable reply, finishes the washing and goes up, the personator going up also. Then the host fills the goblet, the personator bowing and receiving it. The host returns to his place and bows in reply. Then the personator faces north, sits, and lays the goblet to the left of the relishes, the personator, aide, and host all going to their mats.
