= Great Learning =

Chinese classic, preserved as a chapter in the Lijing

Chinese name
- Traditional Chinese: 大學
- Simplified Chinese: 大学
- Hanyu Pinyin: Dàxué
Transcriptions
Standard Mandarin
- Hanyu Pinyin: Dàxué
- Bopomofo: ㄉㄚˋ ㄒㄩㄝˊ
- Gwoyeu Romatzyh: Dahshyue
- Wade–Giles: Ta^{4} Hsüeh^{2}
- IPA: [tâ.ɕɥě]
Wu
- Romanization: Da-ghoh
Yue: Cantonese
- Yale Romanization: Daaihok
- Jyutping: Daai3hok3
- IPA: [taj˧.hɔk̚˧]
Southern Min
- Hokkien POJ: Tāi-ha̍k
- Tâi-lô: Tāi-ha̍k
Middle Chinese
- Middle Chinese: Dai Hæwk
Old Chinese
- Baxter–Sagart (2014): *lˤa[t]-s m-kˤruk

Vietnamese name
- Vietnamese alphabet: Đại Học
- Chữ Hán: 大學

Korean name
- Hangul: 대학
- Hanja: 大學
Transcriptions
- Revised Romanization: Daehak

Japanese name
- Kanji: 大学
- Kana: だいがく
Transcriptions
- Romanization: Daigaku

The Great Learning or Dàxué was one of the "Four Books" in Confucianism attributed to one of Confucius' disciples, Zengzi. The Great Learning had come from a chapter in the Book of Rites which formed one of the Five Classics. It consists of a short main text of the teachings of Confucius transcribed by Zengzi and then ten commentary chapters supposedly written by Zengzi. The ideals of the book were attributed to Confucius, but the text was written by Zengzi after his death.

The "Four Books" were selected by the neo-Confucian Zhu Xi during the Song dynasty as a foundational introduction to Confucianism. Examinations for the state civil service in China came to follow his lead.

== Writing and influence ==
A page from a Siku Quanshu manuscript of the Great Learning from the Zhejiang University

Another page from a Siku Quanshu manuscript of the Great Learning

Confucius, who incorporated ideas from earlier philosophers, compiled or edited the Classic of Rites and the Spring and Autumn Annals, two of the Five Classics. Confucius' student Zengzi wrote the introduction and exposition of the Great Learning. Zengzi lived from 505 to 436 BCE. Confucius taught 100 pupils, 72 of whom mastered his teachings . It is still unclear how much his students wrote and edited.

The Great Learning developed from many authors adapting to the needs and beliefs of the community at the time. The Cheng brothers, Yi (1033–1107) and Hao (1032–1085) both utilized the Great Learning's philosophies. Their ideas met with strong official opposition, but were reconstituted by Zhu Xi. Cheng's idea of yi was that it was identical with nature, which he believed was essentially good. Cheng's yi emphasized the necessity of acquiring knowledge.

During the Southern Song Dynasty, Zhu Xi rearranged the Great Learning and included it in the Four Books, along with the Doctrine of the Mean, the Analects of Confucius and the Mencius. Zhu Xi separated the Great Learning, which was originally a chapter in the Classic of Rites. Zhu Xi organized the book as Jing followed by ten expositions. Zhu Xi was a student of Li Tong. Zhu Xi developed the Chengs' Confucian ideas and drew from Chan Buddhism and Daoism. He adapted some ideas from these competing religions into his form of Confucianism.

Li Ao, a scholar, poet, and official, used and brought attention to the Great Learning. After the Song and Yuan Dynasties, The Great Learning became a required textbook in schools and a required reading for imperial examinations. During the Warring States Xunzi and Mengzi were influenced by the Great Learning. The Great Learning also greatly influenced countries like Japan, Korea, and Vietnam.

Some critics such as Lu Xiangshan and Wang Yangming later disliked the Great Learning because of the stress on scholarship rather than action. Wang Yangming rejected Zhu Xi's changes and returned the text to the original, from the Classic of Rites. During the Han dynasty the Great Learning rose to prominence, and the Classic of Rites had to be re-organized by Dai De and Dai Sheng. They divided the book into five sections. This included the Great Learning, the Doctrine of the Mean, the Evolution of Rites, the Yili, and the "Etiquette and Rites".

Han Yu and Li Ao both used The Great Learning. Li Ao incorporated a lot of Buddhist and Taoist ideas into his work. Zi Si – Confucius's grandson – is said to have taught Mencius and written the Doctrine of the Mean. He may also have written the beginning of the Great Learning. Ma Rong edited the Great Learning in the Han dynasty, giving his views of the general meaning.

== Principal teachings ==
- Achieving a state of "rest in the highest excellence" and refining one's moral self to "illustrious virtue" that will be an example for all people of the realm.
- The "point of rest being known", the "goal of action can be determined", and "deliberation will be followed by the attainment of the desired end."

大學之道，在明明德，在親民，在止於至善。知止而后有定，定而后能靜，靜而后能安，安而后能慮，慮而后能得。物有本末，事有終始，知所先後，則近道矣。

What the Great Learning teaches, is to illustrate illustrious virtue; to renovate the people; and to rest in the highest benevolence. The point where to rest being known, the object of pursuit is then determined; and, that being determined, a calm unperturbedness may be attained to. To that calmness there will succeed a tranquil repose. In that repose there may be careful deliberation, and that deliberation will be followed by the attainment of the desired end. Things have their root and their branches. Affairs have their end and their beginning. To know what is first and what is last will lead near to what is taught in the Great Learning.

- Ample rest and reflection such that one achieves peace of mind. When one is calm and reflected, the Way will be revealed to them.
- Setting priorities and knowing what is important is essential in one's quest for moral refinement, for it allows one to focus on that which is of the greatest importance and that which is in line with the Way as outlined in Confucian teachings.
- One must bring his affairs and relationships into order and harmony. If one hopes to attain order in the state, he must first bring his own family and personal life into order through self-cultivation and the expansion of one's knowledge and the "investigation of things."
- Each and every man is capable of learning and self-cultivation regardless of social, economic or political status. This, in turn, means that success in learning is the result of the effort of the individual as opposed to an inability to learn.
- One must treat education as an intricate and interrelated system where one must strive for balance. No one aspect of learning is isolated from the other and failure to cultivate a single aspect of one's learning will lead to the failure of learning as a whole.

== Meaning of "Investigation of Things" ==
The text sets up a number of controversies that have underlain Chinese philosophy and political thinking. For example, one major controversy has been to define exactly the investigation of things. What things are to be investigated and how has been one of the crucial issues of Chinese philosophy.

One of the first steps to understanding The Great Learning is to understand how to "investigate things". This did not consist of scientific inquiry and experimentation, but introspection, building on what is already "known" of "principle". True introspection was supposed to allow the mind to become all knowing with regards to morality, relationships, civic duty and nature.

== The Great Learning and education in China ==
The Great Learning as we know it today is the result of multiple revisions and commentaries by a number of Confucian and Neo-Confucian scholars. The Great Learning, along with the Doctrine of the Mean had their beginnings as chapters within the Book of Rites. Both were removed from the Book of Rites and designated as separate, and equally significant, works by Zhu Xi. In the winter of 1190 CE Zhu Xi published the Four Masters, a collection of the Great Learning, Doctrine of the Mean, the Mencius and the Analects. These four texts soon became the initial basis of study in the Chinese imperial examination system. Zhu Xi was prompted to refine the Great Learning and incorporate it into the curriculum as he felt that the previously utilized Classics were lengthy and too difficult to comprehend by the common individual to be used as an educational foundation for Confucian thought. Utilizing the much shorter and more comprehensible Four Books would allow Zhu to reach a much greater audience. To aid in comprehension of the Great Learning, he spent much of his life studying the book and published a series of commentaries explaining the principal teachings of the text. The Daxue itself gets its name from 大人之學; dàrén zhī xué, referring to the education of adults. Unlike many scholars before him, Zhu Xi presents the Great Learning as the way of self cultivation and governance that is to be studied by all people, not only those in, or seeking, political office.

== Impact on education in China ==
Although the Imperial Examination System is no longer used as a means of determining one's place in the social hierarchy, education and the teachings of the Great Learning remain an integral part of modern educational and political culture in China. In fact, a number of scholars believe that all education in mainland China is based on Confucianism to some degree although many individuals, students and teachers alike, are unaware of the Confucian influence on their education. The Great Learning was written and later published as its own book, to serve as an introduction and foundational guide for the further study of Confucian texts. The Great Learning provides a step-by-step illustration of how all aspects of society, ranging from the refinement of the self to the order within one's household or state is ultimately dependent upon the expansion of one's knowledge.

=== Effects on education in Modern China ===
- A Valued Education: China is characterized by a great appreciation for education as it is still viewed as a means of securing a rewarding career, thus elevating an individual in terms of social status. The modern schooling system relates directly to the teachings of the Great Learning as educational institutions represent the primary sites for the expansion of knowledge and the investigation of "things." It is quite common in China for great sums of money to be spent to secure the best possible education. Due to the high value of a quality education, illiteracy and drop-out rates throughout China are very low.
- Memorization: Due to the service examination system which involved the memorization and recitation of Confucian Texts, including The Great Learning, memorization remains a key element in Chinese learning. Throughout much of China, it is still held that one should memorize as much knowledge as they possibly can, as one is incapable of the creation of intelligent thought without first obtaining enough basic knowledge. The focus on exams and the recitation of knowledge is, however, often attributed to "surface learning," but memorization is not used in isolation and represents only one aspect of a student's quest for knowledge and self-cultivation. This focus on memorization can be seen in the consistency in which Chinese students excel in mathematics and sciences.
- Working Collaboratively: Due to the Confucian values of harmony, relationship and moral cultivation as presented in the Great Learning, students in China were traditionally taught the value of collaborative learning. To this day, group learning remains the most popular learning method throughout the bulk of China.
- Hard Work: The Great Learning states that all people are to expand their knowledge and cultivate themselves. This, in turn, is often interpreted to mean that all people are capable of learning, and that failure is not a result of a lack of ability, but a lack of effort. As a result of this philosophy, Chinese students are known worldwide as being very hardworking, putting a great deal of effort into everything they do.
- A Respectful Learning Atmosphere: Due largely to the high value of a quality education and the Confucian teaching of respect for one's elders, educators in Chinese culture are treated with the utmost respect. In fact, teachers are customarily granted the same level of respect given to a parent. As a result of this level of respect for educators and the institution as a whole, students are not quick to interrupt or otherwise challenge the authority of those delivering the knowledge required for a successful future.

== Impact on Chinese politics ==
The Great Learning played a major role in Chinese politics as it comprised one of the texts incorporated into the Imperial service examination system. Students would be tested on their knowledge of the Five Classics and Four Books as a qualification for an occupation in political office. If a student possessed adequate knowledge of the texts, they would be awarded a prestigious place in government. These exams allow anyone of sufficient knowledge and skill to obtain a place in office, as exams were based solely on one's ability. One's social or financial status did not play a role in the exam system. The text of The Great Learning provides an educational basis for those aspiring to obtain a leadership role. In addition to self-cultivation and the expansion of one's knowledge, the Great Learning goes into significant step-by-step detail with respect to the qualities of a proper ruler. The text then goes on to describe the projected quality and stability of the state if its ruler follows the guidelines described therein. One such passage states that a person should "cultivate himself, then regulate the family, then govern the state, and finally lead the world into peace" There are two common interpretations of this passage. One common interpretation of this passage is that before one can hope to successfully lead the people, he/she must first cultivate himself (herself) by bringing order to. One may also interpret this passage to be stating that once one has reached a sufficient level of cultivation, he/she should seek a position in office with which to lead the people of the state in accordance with the values and practices outlined in the Great Learning and other such Confucian and Neo-Confucian texts.

A term used in the text, "qin-min" (親民) which James Legge, following Zhu Xi, amended to "xin-min" (新民) and translated "renovating the people" instead of "loving the people", became the name of the People First Party (Republic of China), one of the minor parties in Taiwan.

There are several works that were written to give commentaries on Great Learning, such as Zhen Dexiu's Expanded Meaning of the Great Learning (Daxue Yanyi) and Qiu Jun's Complement to the Expanded Meaning of the Great Learning (Daxue Yanyibu).

== Textual significance ==
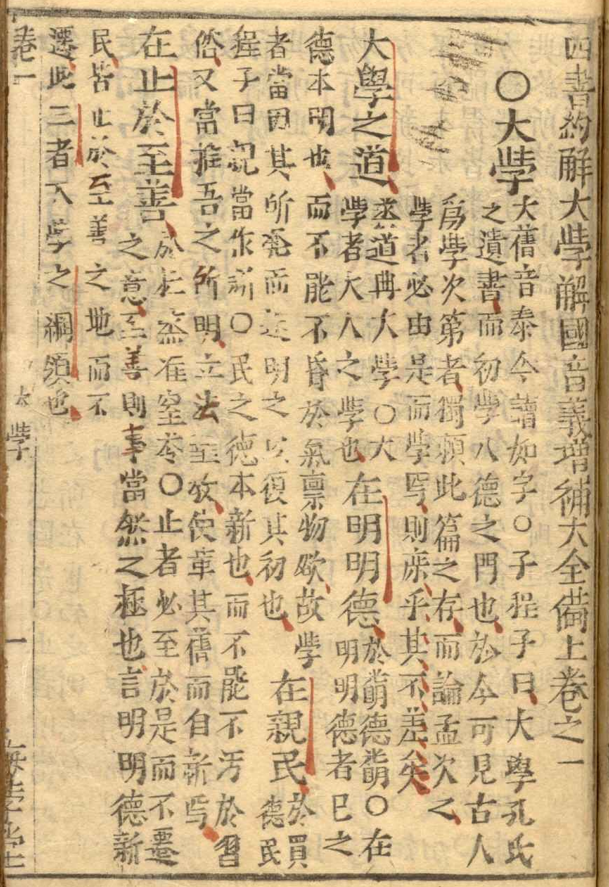
A Vietnamese giải âm translation of the Great Learning, in which the original text is presented in large Chinese characters, accompanied by a vernacular translation rendered in smaller-sized chữ Nôm script.

The Great Learning is significant because it expresses many themes of Chinese philosophy and political thinking, and has therefore been extremely influential both in classical and modern Chinese thought. The Great Learning represented a key aspect of the Chinese curriculum and can be found in virtually all aspects of Chinese culture. The Great Learning within the Chinese curriculum acted as a "springboard" for further learning, "self cultivation and investigation of things." Through self-cultivation one can bring order and harmony to one's mind, personal life, family, state and the world as a whole. By defining the path of learning (Dao) in governmental and social terms, the Great Learning links the spiritual realm with daily life, thus creating a vision of the Way (Dao) that is radically different from that of non-action as presented by Daoism. The Great Learning, on the other hand, requires action on the part of the individual towards the ultimate goal of self-cultivation through the "expansion of knowledge and the investigation of things." The Great Learning presents Confucianism as being this-worldly rather than other-worldly. As opposed to basing its authority on an external deity, the Great Learning bases its authority on the practices of ancient kings.
