= Wuxing (text) =

Wu xing (Chinese: 五行; pinyin: Wǔxíng) is a Warring States period text ascribed to Zisi, known mainly due to the Mawangdui Han tombs site (1973, sealed 168 BCE) and Guodian (1993, sealed about 300 BCE) discoveries.

The Relationship between the two versions of the text remains debated. Unlike the Guodian version, written on bamboo strips, the Mawangdui "Wu xing" is written on silk and contains both the main text (jing) identical to that of the Guodian and the explanation (shuo).

The text is related to the "Zhongyong" and "Daxue" (presently chapters in the Classic of Rites). However, in Mawangdui Han tombs site it was discovered written in the same scroll with the Laozi.

== Literature ==
- Mark Csikszentmihalyi, Material Virtue: Ethics and the Body in Early China. 2005.
- Kenneth Holloway, "The Five Aspects of Conduct" 五行: Introduction and Translation. Journal of the Royal Asiatic Society, Third Series, Vol. 15, No. 2 (Jul., 2005), pp. 179-198.
