= Dai De =

Dai De (Chinese: 戴德; pinyin: Dài Dé), also known as Da Dai (Chinese: 大戴; lit. 'Big Dai'; more formally, "Dai the Greater", birth and death unknown), was a Confucian scholar of the western Han dynasty. He was active during the reign of Emperor Xuan of Han and then Emperor Yuan of Han (48–33 BC).

He was the brother of Dai Ren (戴仁) and the uncle of Dai Sheng. He was a native of Liang (now Shangqiu, Henan) and a founder of the New Text Confucian (Simplified: 今文经学; Traditional: 今文經學 Jinwen jingxue) exegesis of "classical texts concerned with codes of conduct" (Simplified: 今文礼学; Traditional: 今文禮學: Jinwen lixue) during the Former Han dynasty.

He was traditionally credited with producing a substantially edited version of the Book of Rites (Li Ji) that bore his name: Dai the Greater's Book of Rites (大戴禮記 Da Dai Li Ji).

Dai de and Dai sheng were at the shuqiu Pavilion meeting held by the emperor focused on deciding points of Confucian cannon the Guliang Zhuan commentary on the spring and autumn annals won against the Gongyang Zhuan commentary this meeting inspired the Bai hu tong white tiger hall meeting.

In Da Dai li ji the small calendar of the Xia or hisa is inserted it is a calendar of the Xia dynasty and might be the oldest book in China. It describes pheasants going into the water to become big mollusks this is an expression to mark the seasons and is also seen in the book of rites.

But in regards to the Da Dai li ji Dai's prestigious name could have been attached to an edited version of the Book of Rites in order to legitimate a much-revised text. Traditionally in the Book of sui the preceding version was said to have consisted of an initial 131 essays (篇 pian), to which an additional 83 were subsequently added. Dai is said to have reduced the resulting 214 essays to 85, which his nephew, Dai Sheng, was then supposed to have further reduced too 46 then 3 additional essays were added later to reach a final total of 49. however, to attribute these revisions to either Dai De or Dai Sheng is debatable, both of whom were, nevertheless, trained as Confucian scholars specializing in various texts concerning "codes of conduct" (禮 li rites). Dai's reputed influence on these texts on Rites which include the Rites of Zhou and the Book of Etiquette and Ceremonial, is also uncertain.
