= Qiu Jun (poet) =

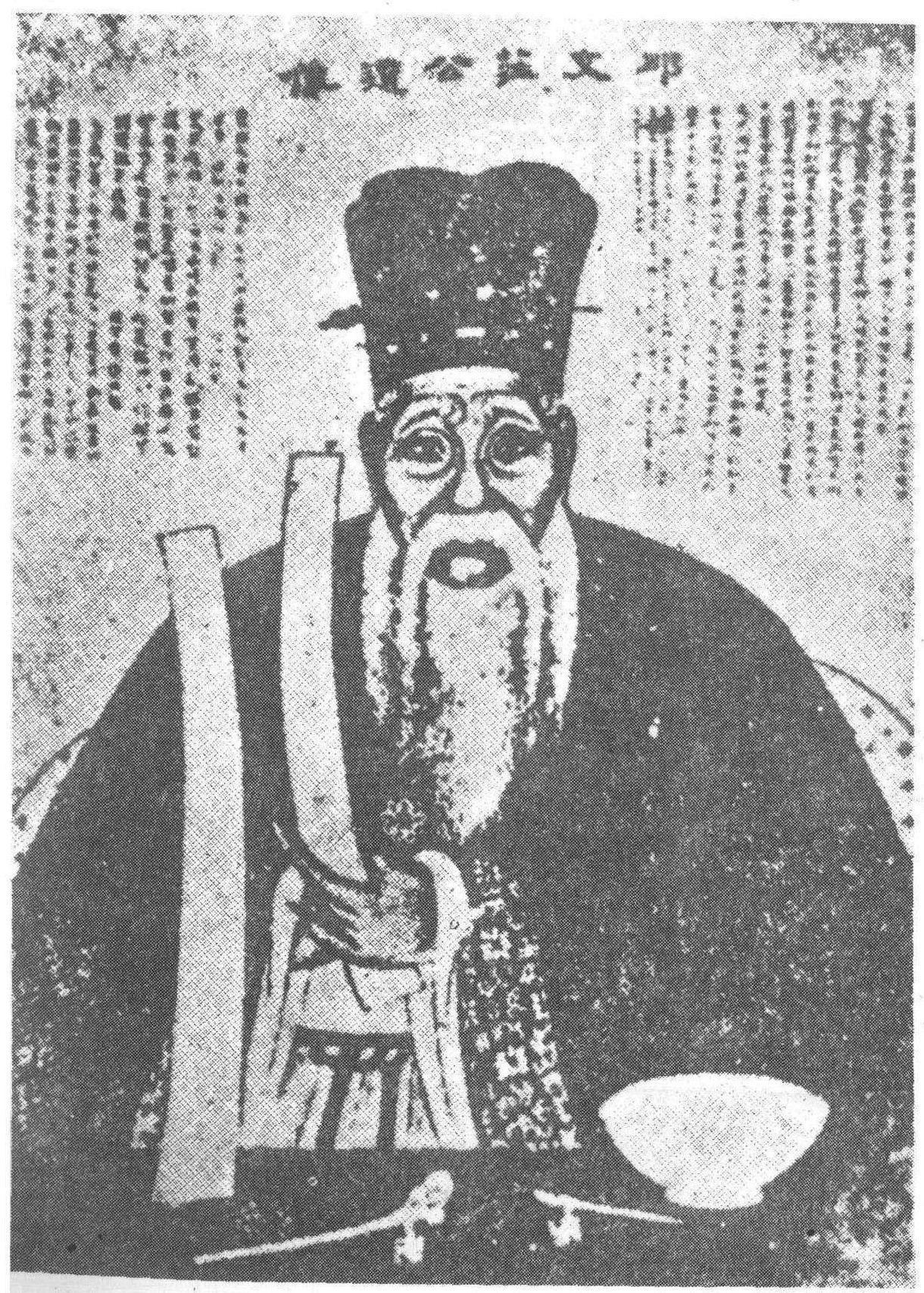
Qiu Jun

Qiu Jun (1421-1495) was a politician, writer and economist during the Ming dynasty. He was born in Qiongshan, Guangdong. During the reign of Hongzhi, he was appointed as the Minister of Revenue, Grand Secretary of the Wuying Hall. He developed Zhen Dexiu's work and is famous for his economics work, Complement to the Expanded Meaning of the Great Learning (Daxue Yanyibu).
