= Dai Sheng =

Han dynasty official

Dai Sheng (traditional Chinese: 戴聖; simplified Chinese: 戴圣; pinyin: Dài Shèng), also known as Xiao Dai (Chinese: 小戴; lit. 'Little Dai', birth and death unknown), was the Scholar of Rituals to Emperor Xuan of the Former Han dynasty. He was the son of Dai Ren (戴仁) and the nephew of Dai De. He was a native of Liang (now Shangqiu, Henan) and a founder of the Former Han dynasty Jinwen Jingxue (今文经学, School of Confucianism).

He helped compile the Book of Rites (Li Ji), reducing the 85 books of Dai De's version down to 46. Three books were later added to make 49 that still exist. Dai Sheng's version is known as Xiao Dai Li Ji 小戴礼记.

Dai Sheng and Dai De were at the shuqiu Pavilion meeting where the emperor invited scholars to debate key points of Confucian cannon the Guliang zhuan won over the Gongyang Zhuan regarding the spring and autumn annals commentaries and it inspired the Bai hu tong or the white tiger hall meeting.

He and Dai de are mentioned in the three character classic as writing commentaries to the book of rites.

Dai theorized that annual government expenditures should equal the average of annual government revenue over the previous thirty years.
