= Classic of Music =

Lost Confucian classic text

- Traditional Chinese: 樂經
- Simplified Chinese: 乐经
Transcriptions
Standard Mandarin
- Hanyu Pinyin: Yuèjīng
- Wade–Giles: Yüeh^{4}-ching^{1}
- IPA: [ɥê.tɕíŋ]
Yue: Cantonese
- Yale Romanization: Ngohk-gīng
- Jyutping: Ngok6 ging1
Southern Min
- Tâi-lô: Ga̍k-king
Middle Chinese
- Middle Chinese: /ŋˠʌk̚ keŋ/
Old Chinese
- Zhengzhang: /*ŋraːwɢ keːŋ/

The Classic of Music (Chinese: 樂經) was a Confucian classic text lost by the time of the Han dynasty. It is sometimes referred to as the "Sixth Classic" (for example, by Sima Qian) and is thought to have been important in the traditional interpretations of the Classic of Poetry.

Qing dynasty scholar Shao Yichen (邵懿辰, 1810–1861) proposed that the book never existed, but more usually it is thought that all copies were destroyed during the burning of books and burying of scholars.

A few traces remain in other surviving works, including the Zuo Zhuan, the Rites of Zhou, and the extremely redacted, poor-quality Record of Music contained in the Classic of Rites. As accounted in the Book of Han, Dou Gong 竇公 (5-4 cc. BC), a musician of the state of Wei possessed a copy of the Classic of Music which was presented to the Emperor Wen of Han. However, the text is associated with the Dàsīyuè zhī zhí (大司樂之職) section of the Rites of Zhou, leading to the belief that the Classic of Music is a section of the Rites of Zhou itself.

In 2022, Luke Waring has suggested that there is not enough convincing evidence that a music classic existed during the Warring States era in the first place. However, this topic remains heavily debated amongst scholars.
