= Record of Music =

Record of Music (Chinese: 樂記; pinyin: Yuè Jì) is the 19th chapter of the Book of Rites. It constitutes the grounds for reconstruction of the lost Classic of Music.

The authorship of the Yueji is a matter of debate. The Book of Sui ascribes it to Gongsun Nizi, a second-generation disciple of Confucius, and this view was common during the Tang dynasty. However, the present version includes reference to Marquis Wen of Wei and Zi Xia's meeting which could not have occurred during Gongsun Nizi's life. Qiu Qiongsun claims another Gongsun Ni lived during the Han dynasty, authored the book, and it was later erroneously ascribed to the better-known Confucian disciple.

The Yueji is mentioned in the "Yiwen zhi" chapter of the Book of Han, which was built on Liu Xin's Qilue. There, its authorship is ascribed to Liu De, a son of the Han emperor Jing, and his friends. The contents of Yueji are fully present in the Yueshu chapter of the Records of the Grand Historian, but, as argued by Martin Kern, this chapter is a later addition to Sima Qian's work, probably dating to the Eastern Han period. According to Kern, this might bear on the dating of the Yue ji itself.

Kong Yingda (574 – 648) records in his Liji Zhengyi that in his editorial work Liu Xiang came across another Yueji variant, much different from Liu De's. Unfortunately, of the 23 chapters known to Liu Xiang, only 11 are known.

Scott Cook's research concludes on the Warring States authorship of Yue ji as the most probable.

Material related to the Yueji can be found in Xunzi's "Yuelun", the Xici zhuan comment to the Yijing, the "Great Preface" to the Book of Songs, Lüshi Chunqiu, and other sources.
