= Book of Rites =

Chinese classic text

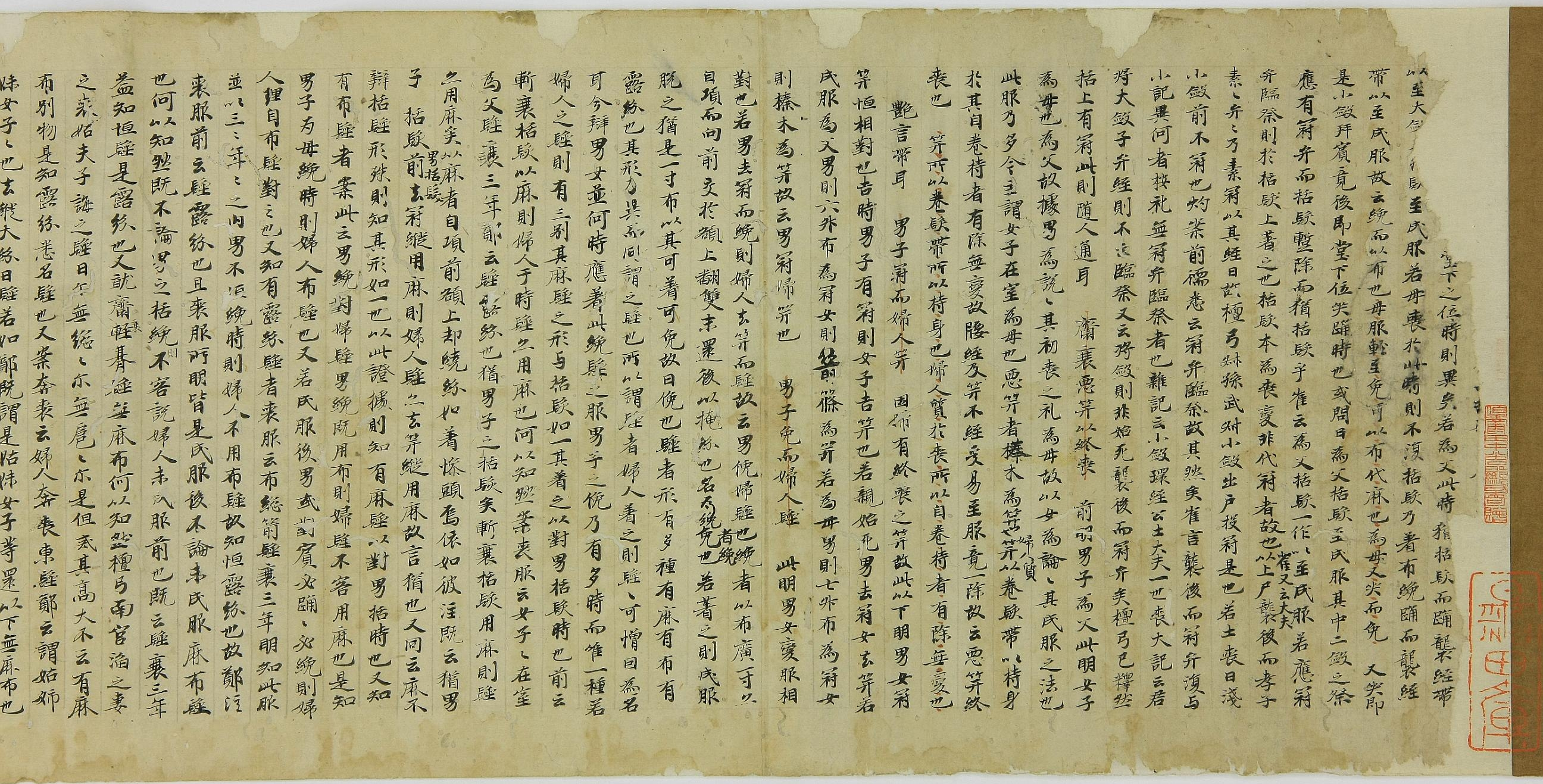
- An annotated version of the Book of Rites, dated before 907

Chinese name
- Traditional Chinese: 禮記
- Simplified Chinese: 礼记
- Literal meaning: record of rites
Transcriptions
Standard Mandarin
- Hanyu Pinyin: Lǐjì
- Wade–Giles: Li^{3}-chi^{4}
- IPA: [lì tɕî]
Yue: Cantonese
- Yale Romanization: Láih-gei
- Jyutping: Lai^{5} gei^{3}
- IPA: [lɐj˩˧ kej˧]
Southern Min
- Hokkien POJ: Lé-kì
Middle Chinese
- Middle Chinese: Léj-kì
Old Chinese
- Baxter–Sagart (2014): *Rˤijʔ krə-s

Alternative Chinese name
- Traditional Chinese: 禮經
- Simplified Chinese: 礼经
- Literal meaning: rites classic
Transcriptions
Standard Mandarin
- Hanyu Pinyin: Lǐjīng
- Wade–Giles: Li^{3}-ching^{1}
Yue: Cantonese
- Yale Romanization: láih gīng
- Jyutping: lai5 ging1
Southern Min
- Hokkien POJ: Lé-keng
- Tâi-lô: Lé-king

Vietnamese name
- Vietnamese: Kinh Lễ
- Hán-Nôm: 經禮

Korean name
- Hangul: 예기
- Hanja: 禮記
Transcriptions
- Revised Romanization: Yegi

Japanese name
- Kanji: 礼記
- Hiragana: らいき
Transcriptions
- Romanization: Raiki

The Book of Rites, also known as the Liji (禮記), is a collection of texts that describe the social forms, administrative structures, and ceremonial rites of the Zhou dynasty, as interpreted during the Warring States period and the early Han dynasty. Together with the Rites of Zhou (Zhōulǐ, 周禮) and the Book of Etiquette and Rites (Yílǐ, 儀禮), it forms part of the "Three Li" (Sānlǐ, 三禮), which comprise the ritual (lǐ, 禮) component of the Five Classics—a foundational set of texts in the Confucian tradition. Each of the Five Classics is a compilation of works rather than a single text.

As a core Confucian text, the Book of Rites is also referred to as the Classic of Rites or Lǐjīng (禮經). Some scholars suggest that Lijing was the original title before it was changed by the Han dynasty scholar Dai Sheng.

== Legitimacy ==
That the Book of Rites contains genuine Warring States period documents (in addition to Han documents) was questioned in China during the Doubting antiquity movement.

In 1993, a copy of the "Black Robes" chapter was discovered in Tomb 1 of the Guodian tombs in Jingmen, Hubei province. As the tomb was sealed around 300 BCE, the discovery reignited scholarly debate regarding the dating of other chapters of the Liji, particularly their possible origins in the Warring States period.

Traditionalist Liu Xiaogan (2014) argues that the Book of Rites is now recognized as including "reliable historical materials", and that "at least some sections may preserve pre-Qin dynasty works."

== History ==
The Book of Rites is a diverse compilation of texts of uncertain origin and date. Unlike the Rites of Zhou and the Book of Etiquette and Ceremonial, it lacks a consistent overall structure. Some sections provide definitions of ritual terminology—particularly those found in the Book of Etiquette and Ceremonial—while others contain details concerning the life and teachings of Confucius. Portions of the text have been traced to pre-Han works such as the Xunzi and the Lüshi Chunqiu, while other sections are believed to have been composed during the Former Han period.

During the reign of Qin Shi Huang, many Confucian texts were destroyed in the 213 BCE "Burning of the Books." However, the Qin dynasty collapsed within a decade, and Confucian scholars who had memorised the classics or hidden written copies helped to reconstruct them during the early Han dynasty. The Book of Rites was said to have been fully recovered, although the Classic of Music could not be recompiled. Only fragments of the latter survive, primarily within the "Record of Music" (Yueji) chapter of the Book of Rites.

Subsequent efforts were made to edit and organise the recompiled texts. According to the Book of Sui, the scholar Dai De revised the collection in the 1st century BCE, reducing it from 214 books to 85, known as the Ritual Records of Dai the Elder (大戴禮記; Dà Dài Lǐjì). His nephew, Dai Sheng, later abridged this to 46 books, known as the Ritual Records of Dai the Younger (小戴禮記; Xiǎo Dài Lǐjì). The scholar Ma Rong subsequently added three additional books, bringing the total to 49. However, later scholarship has questioned this account, noting a lack of reliable evidence attributing these specific revisions to Dai De or Dai Sheng, although both were known Confucian scholars with expertise in ritual texts.

During this period, both old-script and new-script versions of the text were in circulation, and the content was not yet standardised. Zheng Xuan, a student of Ma Rong, produced an annotated edition of the Rites by synthesising multiple ritual traditions. His compilation of 49 books became the authoritative version, and it remains the standard edition today. Zheng Xuan's annotated version later formed the basis for the Right Meaning of the Ritual Records (禮記正義; Lǐjì Zhèngyì), the imperially sanctioned text and commentary on the Book of Rites, established in 653 CE.

== Li ==
Confucius described li (禮) as encompassing all traditional forms that provided a standard of conduct. While li is often translated as "rites," it may also refer to "ceremonial practices" or "rules of conduct." Over time, the term has come to be broadly associated with concepts such as "good form," "decorum," and "politeness."

Confucius emphasised that li should reflect a spirit of piety and respect for others, expressed through appropriate behaviour and ritual observance. As outlined in the Book of Rites, li serves to restore the value of traditional practices by drawing upon the simplicity and order of the past. Confucius believed that a return to these standards of conduct would help stabilise society amid the decline of the Zhou dynasty.

The importance of li is highlighted in the Book of Rites, which states: "Of all things to which the people owe their lives, the rites are the most important..." Over time, the concept of li became closely linked to human nature, ethics, and social harmony, as individuals integrated these practices into their daily lives.

Li is viewed as beneficial to society because it guides individuals in recognising and fulfilling their responsibilities toward others, thereby contributing to social cohesion and moral order.

== Legacy ==
Several chapters of the Book of Rites provided the foundation for later works, including the Great Learning and the Doctrine of the Mean. These two texts are traditionally attributed to disciples of Confucius, with one—the Doctrine of the Mean—commonly believed to have been authored by his grandson, Zisi.

During the Song dynasty, the Neo-Confucian scholar Zhu Xi compiled and edited versions of the Great Learning and the Doctrine of the Mean, elevating their status within the Confucian tradition. Together with the Analects and Mencius, these texts became known as the Four Books. Zhu Xi's interpretations significantly influenced Chinese society, education, and state ideology.

Following the decision of the Yuan dynasty—and later upheld by the Ming and Qing dynasties—to adopt the Five Classics and the Four Books as the orthodox texts of Confucianism, these works became the standard curriculum for the imperial civil service examinations. From 1313 to 1905, mastery of these texts was essential for anyone pursuing official positions, and thus, the Book of Rites, along with its derivative works, played a central role in shaping Chinese intellectual and bureaucratic life for centuries.

=== Comparisons ===
The editor of the Han Feizi, W.K. Liao (1939), contrasted the sixth chapter of the Han Feizi with the Book of Rites (Li Ji), interpreting parts of the chapter as "diametrically opposed to the Confucian spirit" and the vision of the "Great Community of Confucius." Elements of the Han Feizi have also been compared to the Daodejing, highlighting philosophical differences between Confucianism, Legalism, and Daoism.

== Contents ==
Table of contents
##	Chinese	Pinyin	Translation
01-02	曲禮上下	Qūlǐ	Summary of the Rules of Propriety Part 1 & 2
03-04	檀弓上下	Tángōng	Tangong Part 1 & 2
05	王制	Wángzhì	Royal Regulations
06	月令	Yuèlìng	Proceedings of Government in the Different Months
07	曾子問	Zēngzǐ Wèn	Questions of Zengzi
08	文王世子	Wénwáng Shìzǐ	King Wen as Son and Heir
09	禮運	Lǐyùn	The Conveyance of Rites
10	禮器	Lǐqì	Implements of Rites
11	郊特牲	Jiāotèshēng	Single Victim At The Border Sacrifices
12	內則	Nèizé	Pattern of the Family
13	玉藻	Yùzǎo	Jade-Bead Pendants of the Royal Cap
14	明堂位	Míngtángwèi	Places in the Hall of Distinction
15	喪服小記	Sāngfú Xiǎojì	Record of Smaller Matters in the Dress of Mourning
16	大傳	Dàzhuàn	Great Treatise
17	少儀	Shǎoyí	Smaller Rules of Demeanour
18	學記	Xuéjì	Record on the Subject of Education
19	樂記	Yuèjì	Record on the Subject of Music
20-21	雜記上下	Zájì	Miscellaneous Records Part 1 & 2
22	喪大記	Sàng Dàjì	Greater Record of Mourning Rites
23	祭法	Jìfǎ	Law of Sacrifices
24	祭義	Jìyì	Meaning of Sacrifices
25	祭統	Jìtǒng	A Summary Account of Sacrifices
26	經解	Jīngjiě	Different Teaching of the Different Kings
27	哀公問	Āigōng Wèn	Questions of Duke Ai
28	仲尼燕居	Zhòngní Yànjū	Zhongni at Home at Ease
29	孔子閒居	Kǒngzǐ Xiánjū	Confucius at Home at Leisure
30	坊記	Fāngjì	Record of the Dykes
31	中庸	Zhōngyōng	Doctrine of the Mean
32	表記	Biǎojì	Record on Example
33	緇衣	Zīyī	Black Robes
34	奔喪	Běnsàng	Rules on Hurrying to Mourning Rites
35	問喪	Wènsāng	Questions About Mourning Rites
36	服問	Fúwèn	Subjects For Questioning About the Mourning Dress
37	間傳	Jiānzhuàn	Treatise on Subsidiary Points in Mourning Usages
38	三年問	Sānnián Wèn	Questions About the Mourning for Three Years
39	深衣	Shēnyī	Long Dress in One Piece
40	投壺	Tóuhú	Game of Pitch-Pot
41	儒行	Rúxíng	Conduct of the Scholar
42	大學	Dàxué	Great Learning
43	冠義	Guānyì	Meaning of the Ceremony of Capping
44	昏義	Hūnyì	Meaning of the Marriage Ceremony
45	鄉飲酒義	Xiāngyǐn Jiǔyì	Meaning of the Drinking Festivity in the Districts
46	射義	Shèyì	Meaning of the Ceremony of Archery
47	燕義	Yànyì	Meaning of the Banquet
48	聘義	Pìnyì	Meaning of Interchange of Missions twixt Different Courts
49	喪服四制	Sàngfú Sìzhì	Four Principles Underlying the Dress of Mourning

== Bibliography ==
- Buckley Ebrey, Patricia. Confucianism and the Family Rituals in Imperial China. New Jersey: Princeton University Press, 1991, ISBN 978-0-691-03150-7
- Chen, Jingpan. Confucius as a Teacher. Beijing: Foreign Languages Press, 1990, ISBN 978-0-8351-2240-5
- Confucius; James Legge; Chʻu Chai; Winberg Chai. Li Chi: Book of Rites. An encyclopedia of ancient ceremonial usages, religious creeds, and social institutions, New Hyde Park, N.Y., University Books [1967]. (originally published in 1885)
- Creel, H.G. Confucius and the Chinese Way. New York: Harper & Row, Publishers, 1949
- Dawson, Raymond (1981), Confucius, Great Britain: The Guernsey Press, ISBN 978-0-19-287536-5.
- de Bary, Wm. Theodore, Wing-tsit Chan, and Buton Watson. Sources of Chinese Tradition. New York and London: Columbia University Press, 1960, ISBN 978-0-231-02255-2
- Holm, Jean, and John Bowker. Sacred Writings. London: Printer Publishers Ltd., 1994
- Lin Yutang. The Wisdom of Confucius. New York: Random House, Inc., 1938
- Liu, Xiaogan (2014). Xiaogan Liu (ed.). Dao Companion to Daoist Philosophy. Springer. ISBN 9789048129270.
- Nylan, Michael (2001), The five "Confucian" classics, Yale University Press, ISBN 978-0-300-08185-5.
- Puett, Michael. "Centering the Realm: Wang Mang, the Zhouli, and Early Chinese Statecraft." in Elman, Benjamin A. and Kern, Martin, eds., Statecraft and Classical Learning: the Rituals of Zhou in East Asian History, pp. 129–154.
- Riegel, Jeffrey K. (1993). "Li chi" 禮記. In Loewe, Michael (ed.). Early Chinese Texts: A Bibliographical Guide. Society for the Study of Early China. pp. 293–297. ISBN 978-1-55729-043-4.
- Smith, Howard. Confucius. Great Britain: Charles Scribner's Sons, 1973
