= Zisi =

Chinese philosopher, grandson of Confucius (c. 481 – 402 BCE)

- 子思
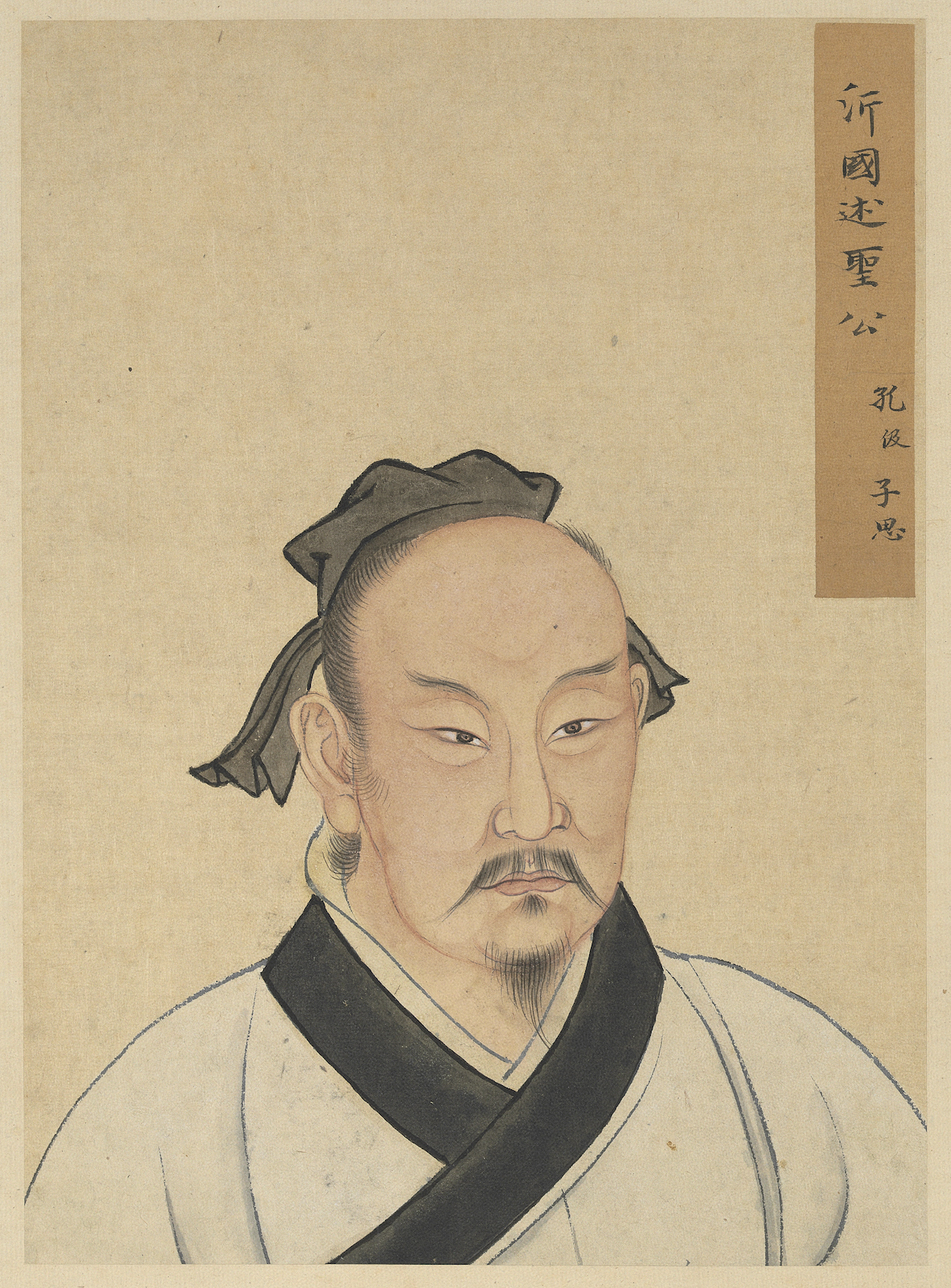
- Zisi depicted in Half Portraits of the Great Sage and Virtuous Men of Old (至聖先賢半身像) – housed in the National Palace Museum in Taipei
- Born: Kong Ji c. 481 BCE
- Died: c. 402 BCE (aged 78-79)
- Resting place: Cemetery of Confucius, Lu
- Occupation: philosopher
- Children: Kong Bai
- Family: Kong Li (father)

Courtesy name
- Chinese: 子思
- Hanyu Pinyin: Zǐsī
Transcriptions
Standard Mandarin
- Hanyu Pinyin: Zǐsī
- Bopomofo: ㄗˇ ㄙ
- Wade–Giles: Tzŭ^{3}-ssŭ^{1}
- Yale Romanization: Džsz̄
- IPA: [tsɹ̩̀.sɹ̩́]
Old Chinese
- Baxter–Sagart (2014): *[ts]əʔ [s]ə

Personal name
- Chinese: 孔伋
- Hanyu Pinyin: Kǒng Jí
Transcriptions
Standard Mandarin
- Hanyu Pinyin: Kǒng Jí
- Bopomofo: ㄎㄨㄥˇ ㄐㄧˊ
- Wade–Giles: Kʻung^{3} Chi^{2}
- Yale Romanization: Kǔng Jí
- IPA: [kʰʊ̀ŋ tɕǐ]

Zisi (c. 481 – c. 402 BCE), born Kong Ji, was a Chinese philosopher and the grandson of Confucius.

== Intellectual genealogy, teaching, criticism ==
Zisi was the son of Kong Li (孔鯉) (Boyu (伯鱼)) and the only grandson of Confucius. He is traditionally accredited with transmitting Confucian teaching to Mencius and writing the Doctrine of the Mean, Biaoji 表記, "Ziyi" (The Black Robes") 緇衣, and "Fangji" (The Record of the Dikes) 坊記, presently chapters of the Liji. (Since Zisi's dates of life do not overlap with those of Mengzi, it has been suggested that the intermediary role in the transmission was played by Shi Shuo 世碩.)

Where his grandfather began to distinguish between true and supposed knowledge, Zisi proceeded upon meditations on the relativity in human knowledge of the universe. He attempted to analyse as many types of action as possible, and believed that wise people who are conscious of their moral and intellectual duties can copy the reality of the universe into themselves.

On par with Mencius, Zisi is attacked by Xunzi in his famous "Against Twelve Masters" chapter. The target of Xunzi's attack is the Wuxing teaching. According to Zhang Binglin (1868-1936), Zisi attempted combining Confucian teaching with the principles of numerology. Li Xueqin suggests that it was done under influence of the text presently constituting the "Great Plan" (Hongfan) chapter of the Shangshu.

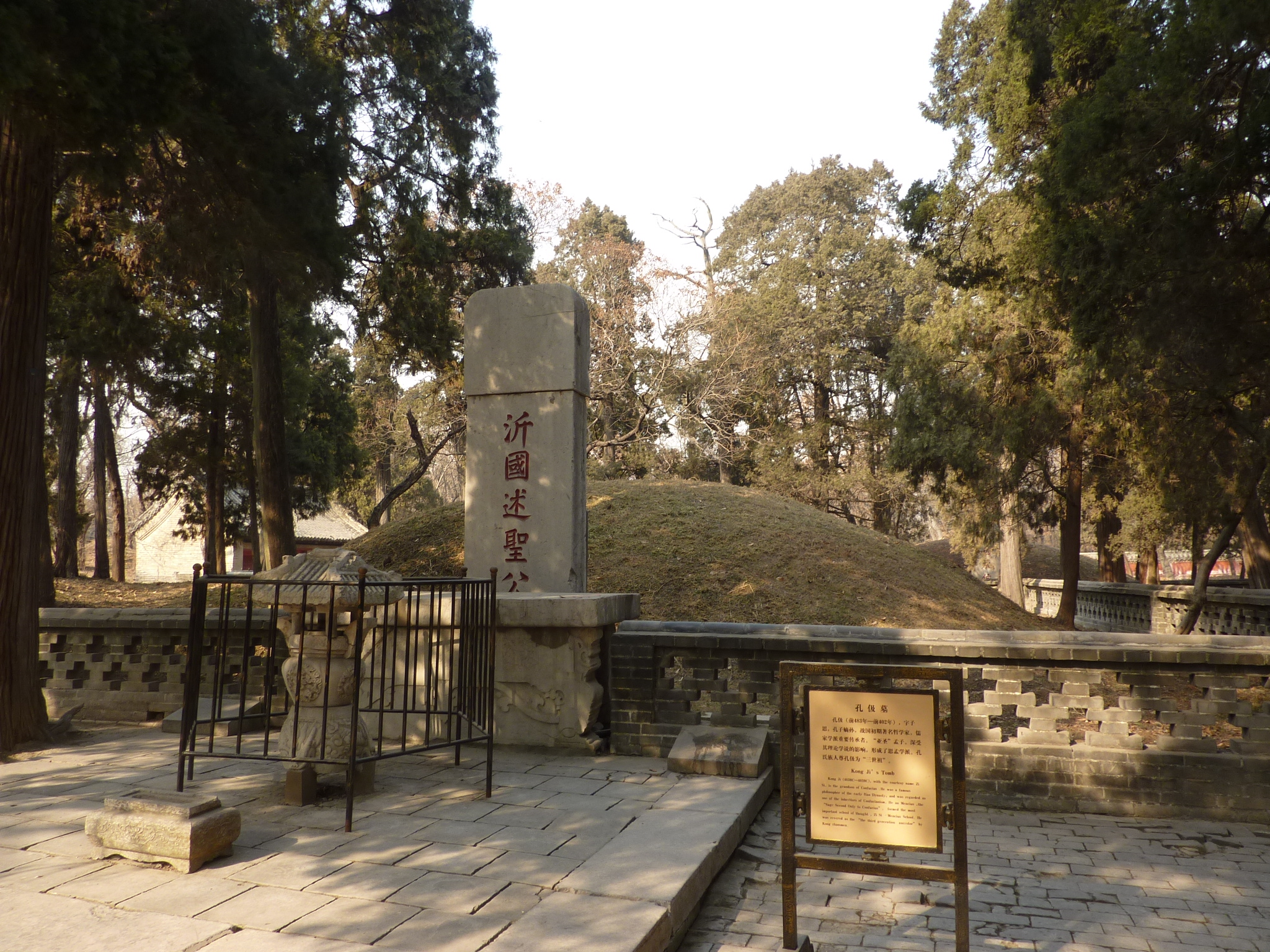
The tomb of Kong Ji in the Cemetery of Confucius, Qufu

The extant version of the book of the same name is ascribed to Zisi. It was compiled by Wang Zhuo (汪晫 Wāng Zhuó) of the Song dynasty, but not recognized as authentic. The more reliable edition was made by Huang Yizhou (1828-1899), drawing the references from Shen Yue (441-513). According to Huang Yizhou, some aspects of Zisi's thinking are paralleled by the Huainanzi.

== Recent discoveries ==
- Wuxing (text), a recent archeological discovery providing new insight into Zisi's teaching.
- Duke Mu of Lu Asks Zisi 《魯穆公問子思》, a Guodian text relating about the concept of the "loyal minister" 忠臣 through the dialogue between Zisi and the young Duke Mu (d. 377 BCE).

== See also ==
- Zengzi, the purported author of the Great Learning. The Great Learning and Zisi's Doctrine of the Mean, two of the Four Books, constituted the foundation of the Confucian orthodoxy.
