= Lady Xuanwen =

4th-century Confucian academician

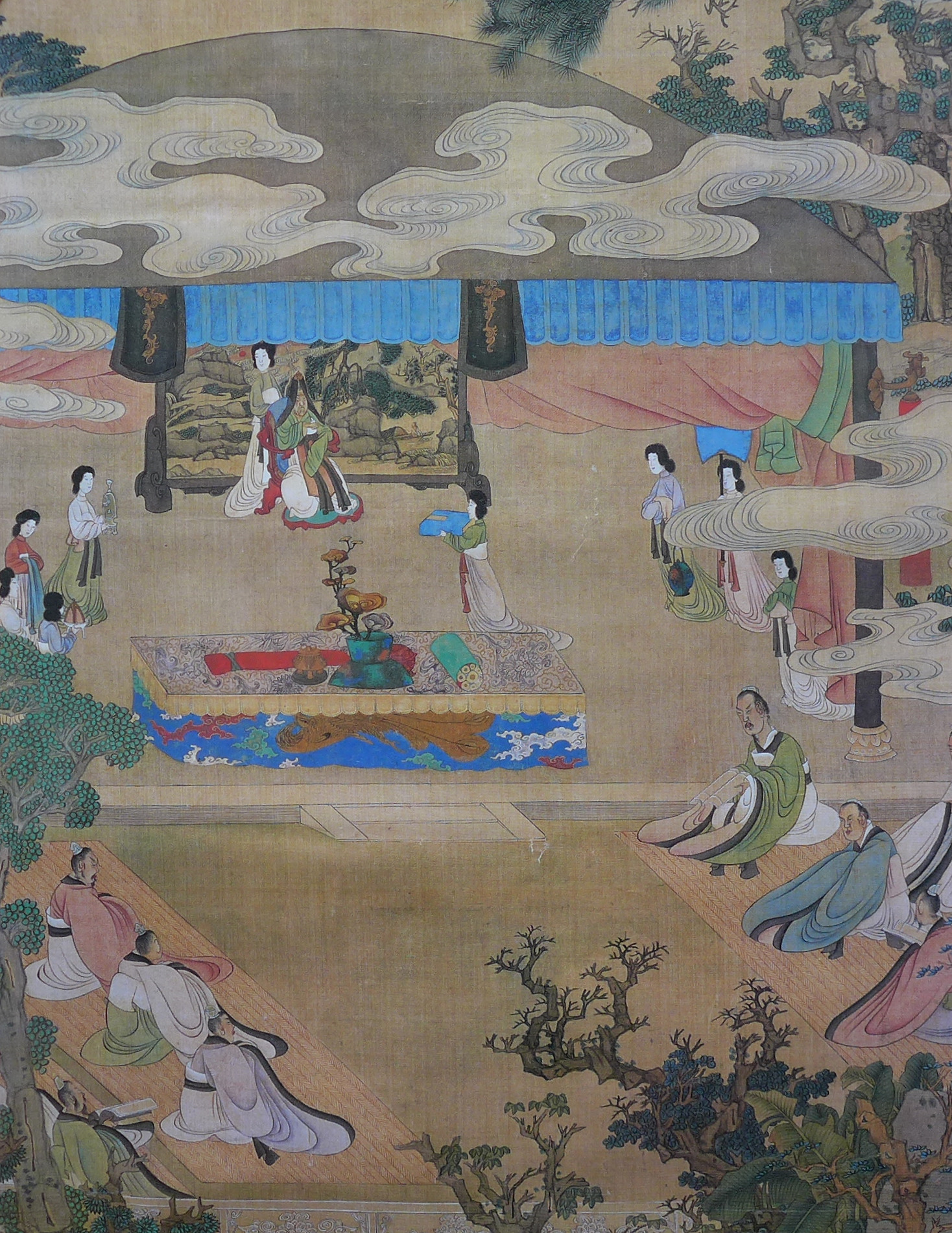
The painting, Lady Xuanwen Giving Instruction on the Rites of Zhou by Chen Hongshou, 1638, depicting Lady Xuanwen delivering one of her lectures, Cleveland Museum of Art.

Lady Song (宋氏; fl. 283–c.362) was a Chinese Confucian scholar and teacher of the Former Qin dynasty during the Sixteen Kingdoms period. An expert in the Rites of Zhou, she was appointed by the Former Qin ruler, Fu Jiān (Emperor Xuanzhao of Former Qin), to teach students on the ancient text, helping to revive interest in the subject. She was a rare instance of a woman academician from her time, and she was bestowed the title of Lady Xuanwen (宣文君) or Lady of Literary Propagation.

== Life ==
It is not known where Lady Song was from, but it is suggested by her biography in the History of the Jin Dynasty that she was from one of the northern provinces as her homeland was occupied by Shi Hu. Her mother died when she was young, so she was instead raised by her father, who taught her an annotated version of the Rites of Zhou. As her father did not have any sons, he entrusted her to pass down his teachings to future generations. She continued to recite the Rites of Zhou even as China fell into chaos during the 4th century. Later, Shi Hu of the Later Zhao dynasty forced her and her family to relocate to Shandong. As her husband pushed a small cart, she carried with her her father's books before ending up in Ji province, where she was given protection by a wealthy man named Cheng Anshou (程安寿).

Lady Song was married into the Wei family and had a son named Wei Cheng (韋逞). When Wei Cheng was young, she would collect firewood for him during the day and teach him during the night, all while never neglecting her weaving and embroidery work. Wei Cheng grew to become an exceptional scholar and was appointed as the Minister of Ceremonies under the Former Qin dynasty. The Former Qin was ruled by Fu Jian, an ethnic Di who was also a staunch Confucianist. During a visit to the Imperial Academy, he had a discussion with the scholars regarding the classics and lamented the decline of Chinese rituals and music. Because the academy had yet to find a teacher for the Rites of Zhou, an academician, Lu Kun (盧壼) suggested to Fu Jian that he appoint Lady Song due to her extensive knowledge of the text, to which he agreed.

At the time, Lady Song was already 80 years old, but her hearing and sight remained sharp. Fu Jian built a lecture hall at her home, where she taught 120 students behind a red gauze curtain. Fu Jian also appointed ten maidservants as her attendants, and bestowed her the title of Lady Xuanwen or Lady of Literary Propagation. Her teachings helped revive interest in the study of the Rites of Zhou, and she was also given the nickname Mother Song (宋母).

== Legacy ==
Lady Xuanwen was held up as a role model for women in traditional China, as both a learned woman and wise mother; unlike most other examples, her prestige was from her learning, rather than her morality or chastity. Along with the daughter of the scholar Fu Sheng, she is one of two women who was credited with passing down the Confucian classics. She is often compared by historians to the scholar Ban Zhao.
