= Kong Li =

Son of Confucius

- 孔鯉
- Born: Kong Li c. 532 BCE
- Died: c. 483 BCE (aged 48-50)
- Resting place: Cemetery of Confucius, Lu
- Other name: Boyu
- Occupation: philosopher
- Children: Kong Ji
- Family: Confucius (father); Lady Qiguan (mother)

Kong Li (c. 532 – c. 483 BCE), courtesy name Boyu (伯魚), was the only son of Confucius and Lady Qiguan (亓官氏), and the father of Kong Ji.

== Birth and naming ==
When Confucius was twenty years old, his son Kong Li was born. The Duke Zhao of Lu sent a gift of carp to Confucius to celebrate the birth. Confucius, feeling honored by the ruler's gesture, named his son Kong Li, with "Li" meaning carp.

== Teachings from Confucius ==
Line 16.13 of the Analects recorded the interaction between Kong Li and his father Confucius:

Confucius' disciple Chen Gang (or Chen Ziqin) once asked Kong Li (Boyu), “Have you received any special teaching from your father?” The other replied: “No. Once, as he was standing alone, and I was discreetly crossing the courtyard, he asked me: ‘Have you studied the Poems? I replied: ‘No.’ He said: ‘If you do not study the Poems, you will not be able to hold your own in any discussion.’ I withdrew and studied the Poems. Another day, as he was again standing alone and I was discreetly crossing the courtyard, he asked me: ‘Have you studied the ritual?’ I replied: ‘No.’ He said: ‘If you do not study the ritual, you will not be able to take your stand in society.’ I withdrew and studied the ritual. These are the two teachings I received.”

Chen Ziqin went away delighted and said: “I asked one thing, and learned three. I learned about the Poems, I learned about the ritual, and I learned how a gentleman maintains distance from his son.”

The story of Kong Li receiving teachings in poetry and rituals became a well-known tale passed down through generations. Confucius' teachings to his son were revered as "ancestral guidance," and this gradually led to the saying within the Kong family that "A family well-versed in poetry and rituals will thrive and prosper, enduring through times."

Confucius said to Boyu: "Kong Li, I have heard that the only thing that can keep people from getting bored all day long is learning. A person's appearance and physique are not worth showing off, bravery and strength cannot make others fearful, ancestors are not worth boasting about, and family names are not worth discussing. To ultimately have a great reputation, to be known far and wide, and to be remembered by future generations— isn't that the result of learning?" Therefore, a gentleman must learn and also groom his appearance. Without grooming, one cannot have a good appearance and demeanor; without a good appearance and demeanor, others will not be close to him; without closeness, loyalty and trust are lost; without loyalty and trust, ritual is lost; and without ritual, the foundation of one's standing is lost. What makes a person appear radiant from a distance is the result of grooming; what makes a person seem more intelligent and wise upon closer inspection is the effect of learning. It is like a storm water pond into which rainwater flows, causing reeds to grow—though people may look at it, who would know its source?"

== Death and posthumous honor ==
In the twelfth year of Duke Ai's reign during the winter, Kong Li died at the age of fifty, preceding the death of Confucius.

- In the first year of Chongning during the reign of Emperor Huizong of the Song dynasty (1102), Kong Li was posthumously conferred the title Marquis of Sishui.
- In the third year of Xianchun during the reign of Emperor Duzong of the Song dynasty (1267), Kong Li was enshrined in the Confucian Temple.
- In the ninth year of Jiajing during the reign of Emperor Shizong of the Ming dynasty (1530), he was renamed "The Sage Kong" and was enshrined in the Temple of Sages within the Guozijian.
