= Chen Hongshou =

Chinese painter (1598–1652)

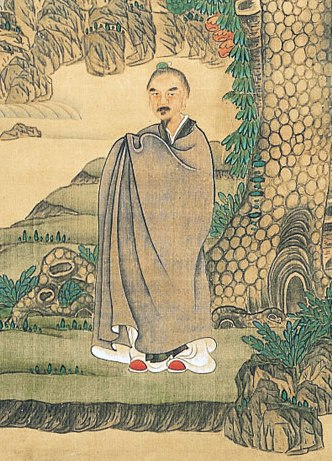
- Self portrait of Chen Hongshou, 1635
- Traditional Chinese: 陳洪綬
- Simplified Chinese: 陈洪绶
Transcriptions
Standard Mandarin
- Hanyu Pinyin: Chén Hóngshòu
- Wade–Giles: Ch'en Hung-shou

Chen Hongshou (1598 Zhuji, Zhejiang province –1652), formerly romanized as Ch'en Hung-shou, was a Chinese painter of the late Ming dynasty.

== Life ==
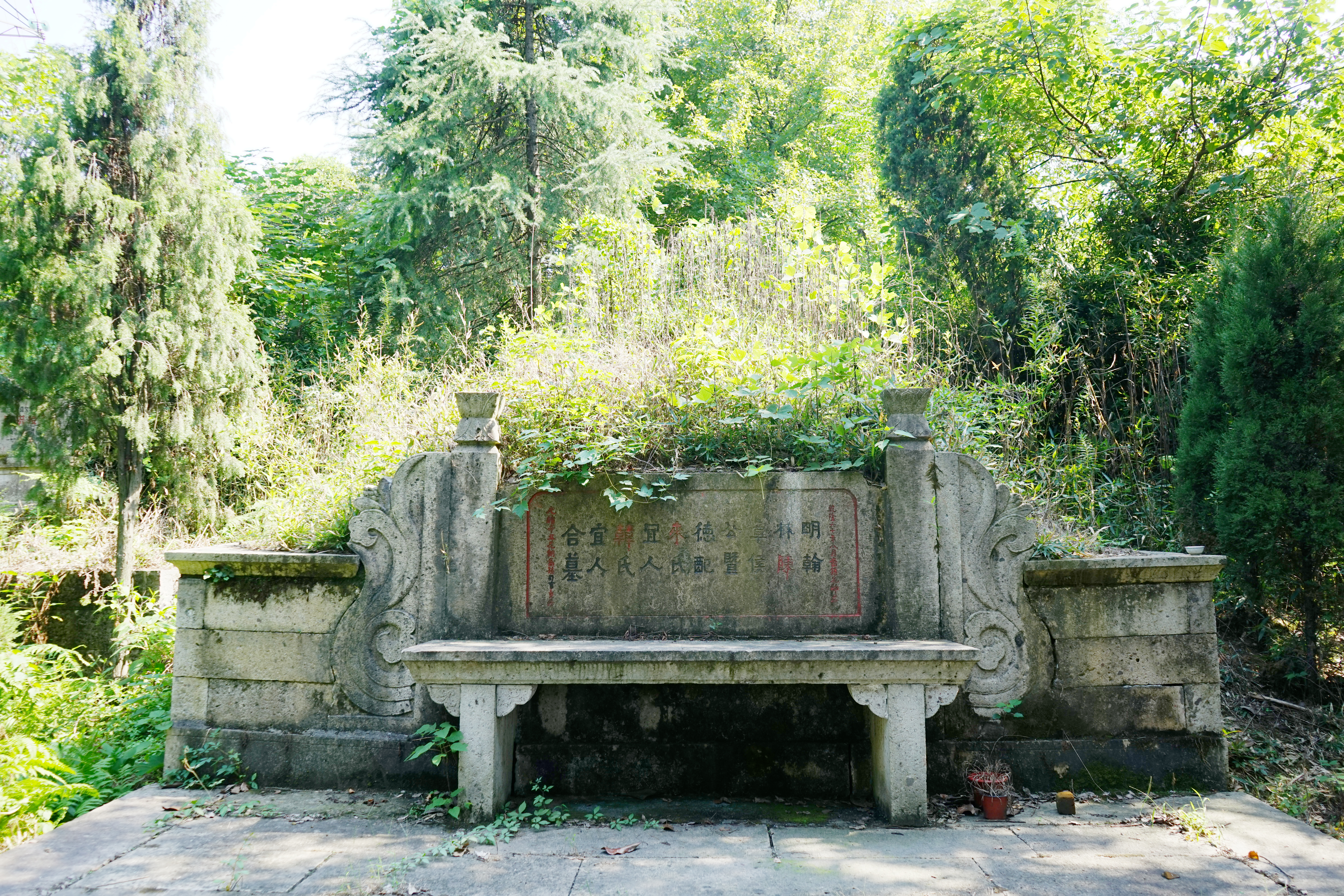
Tomb of Chen Hongshou in Shaoxing.

Chen was born in Zhuji, Zhejiang province in 1598, during the Ming dynasty. His courtesy name was Zhanghou (章侯), and his pseudonyms were Laolian (老莲), Fuchi (弗迟), Yunmenseng (云门僧), Huichi (悔迟), Chiheshang (迟和尚) and Huiseng (悔僧). He once trained under Lan Ying, and was skilled in painting peculiar human figures, landscapes, flower-and-bird. He utilized plump, profound brushwork and precise color, creating a unique style. He always painted illustrations and made tapestry portraits. His two masterpieces, Shui Hu Ye Zi (水浒叶子) and Bo Gu Ye Zi, were the rare examples among the Ming and the Qing dynasties. He was very famous at that time, called "Chen in South and Cui in North", together with Cui Zizhong. He also was skilled in calligraphy, poetry and prose.

== Biography ==
At the age of 9, Chen's father died, but his uncle bred and ensured his education. In 1645, he passed the government examinations, receiving official status, only to flee from the advancing Manchus. In 1646, he became a Buddhist monk; although he struggled in the sometimes conflicting ideals of Buddhist retirement or hermitage and Confucian government service.

== Works ==
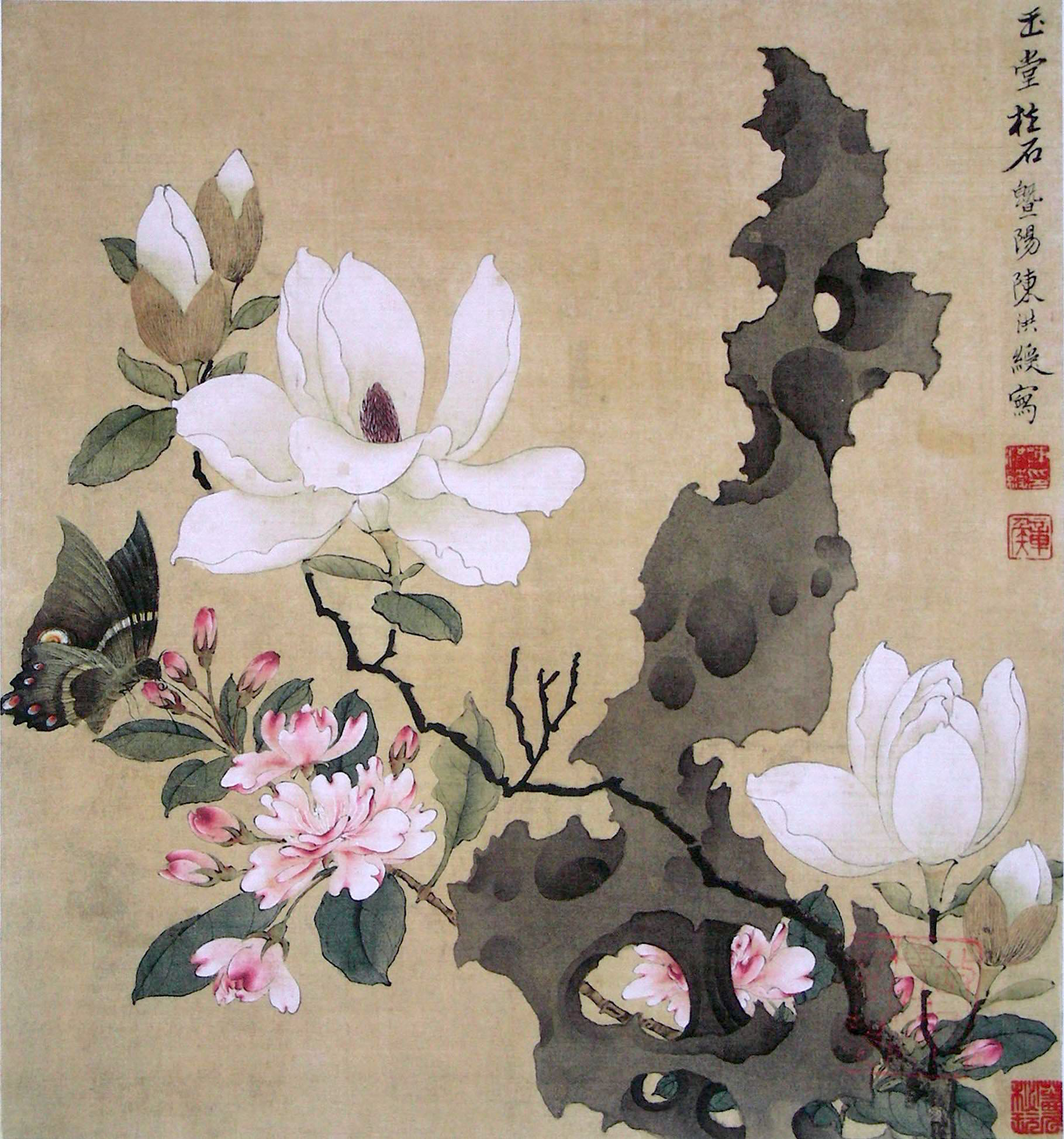
Magnolia and Erect Rock (玉堂柱石圖) by Chen Hongshou, Palace Museum, Beijing

His works are kept in museums and galleries all over the world including these in the United States:

- Returning Home Honolulu Museum of Art
- Flowers & Bird (Xi Shang Mei Shao) Metropolitan Museum of Art
- Immortals Celebrating a Birthday Indianapolis Museum of Art
- Lady Xuanwen Giving Instructions on the Classics Cleveland Museum of Art
- Master Laozi on the Back of Ox Cleveland Museum of Art
- The Mountain of the Five Cataracts Cleveland Museum of Art
- The Dragon King Revering the Buddha Freer Gallery of Art
- A Scholar Instructing Girl Pupils in the Arts Berkeley Museum of Art and Pacific Film Archive (BAMPFA)
- Album of Birds, Flowers, and Landscapes BAMPFA
- Autumn Trees by the River BAMPFA
- Butterflies BAMPFA
- Flowering Tree and Rock BAMPFA
- Lohan (Arhats) BAMPFA
- Standing Figure BAMPFA
- Su Wu and Li Ling, with Attendants (Farewell of Su Wu and Li Ling) BAMPFA

== Gallery ==
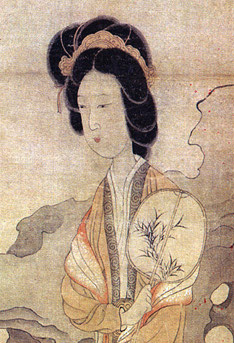
Appreciating Plums, Guangdong Museum

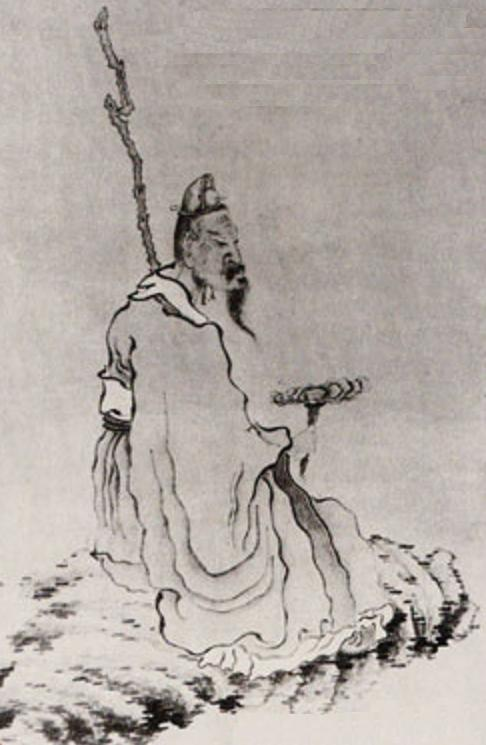
Tao Yuanming holding Lingzhi

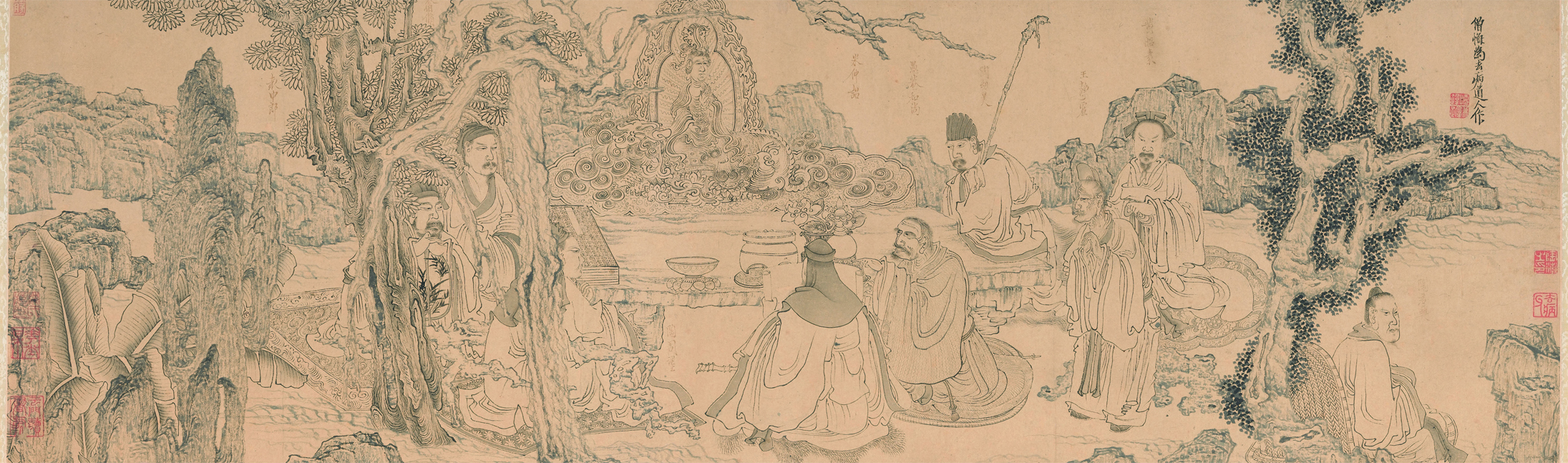
An Elegant Gathering, Shanghai Museum

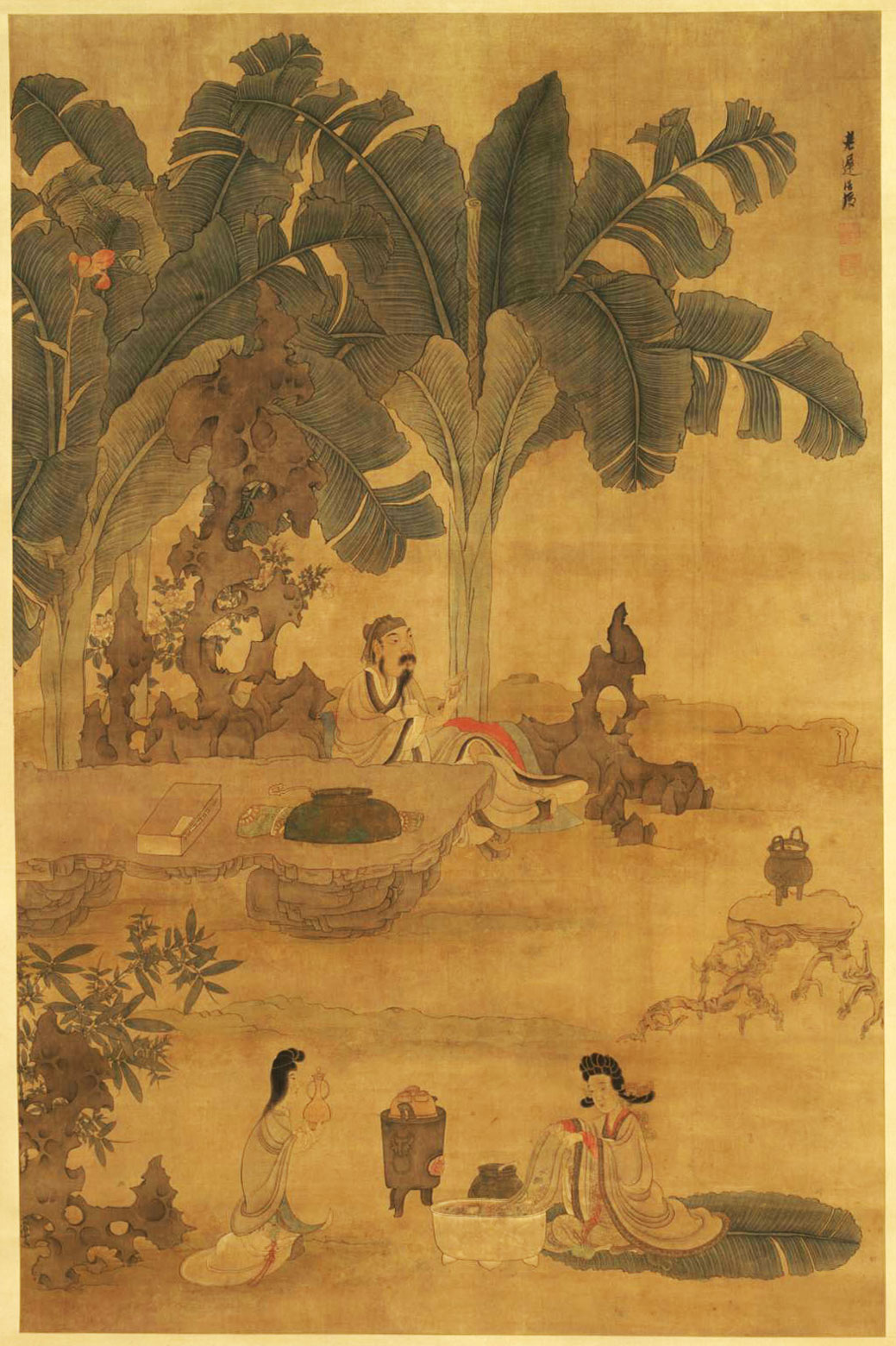
Drinking Wine in the Garden, Shanghai Museum

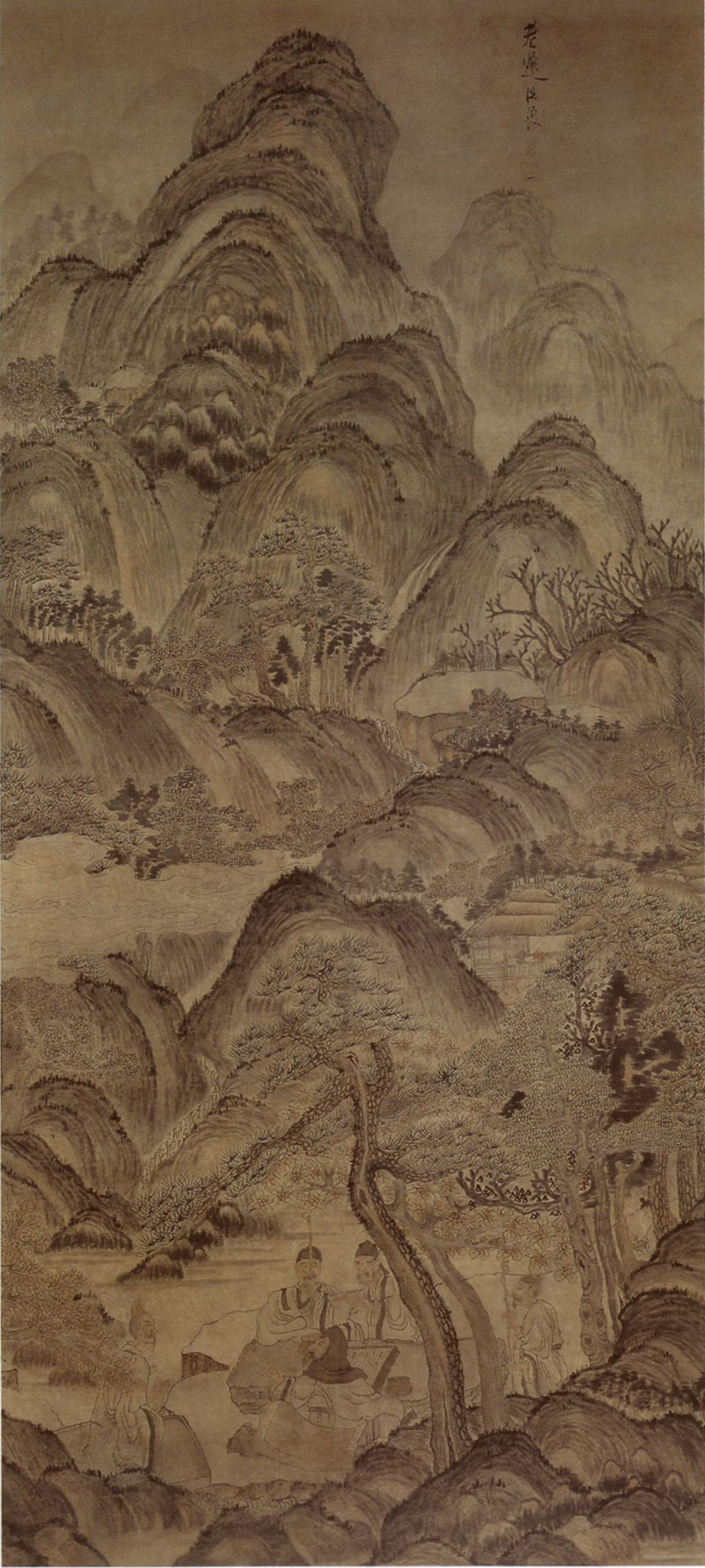
Landscape of Pine Valley, Shanghai Museum

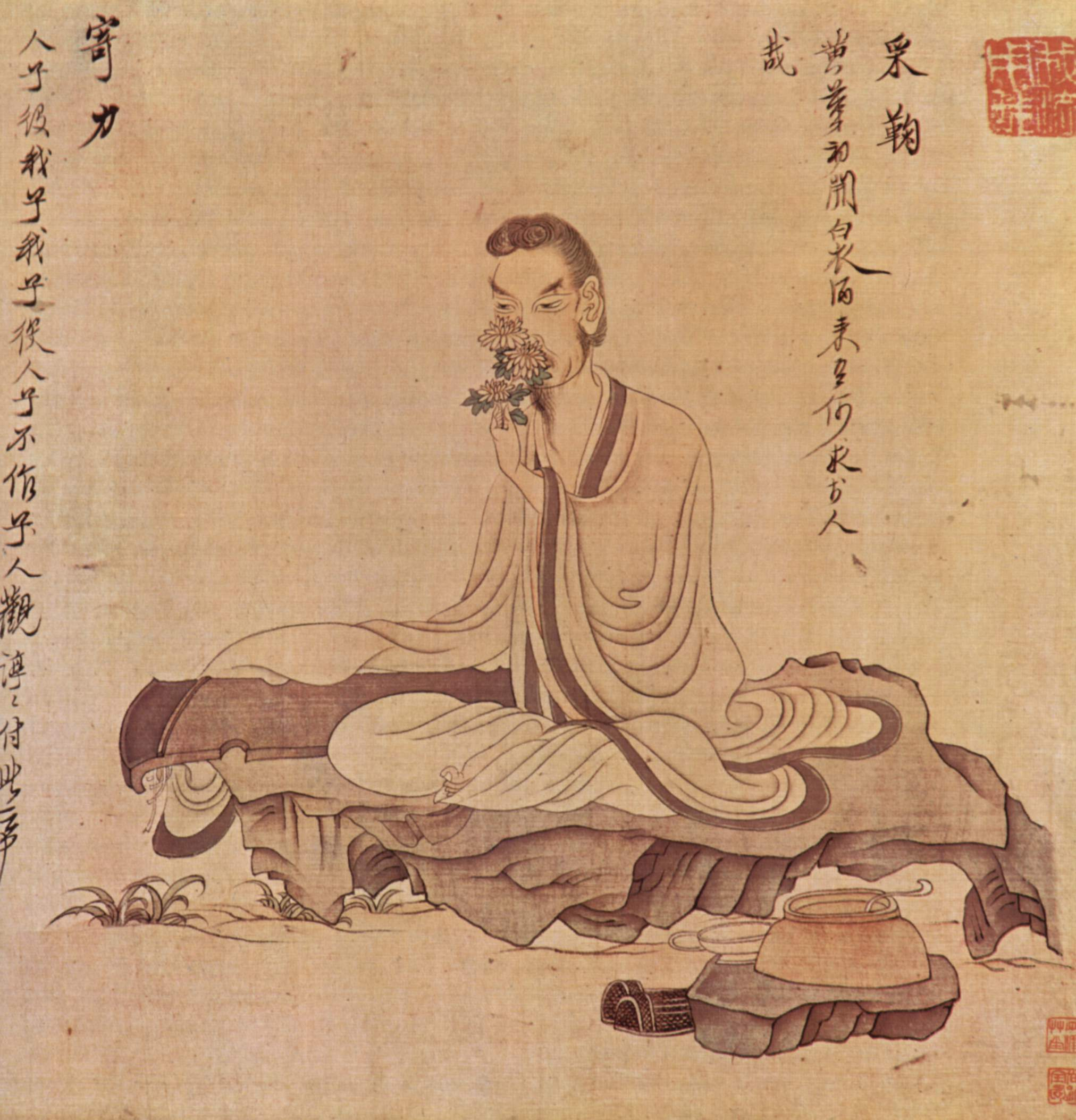
Tao Yuanming, Honolulu Museum of Art

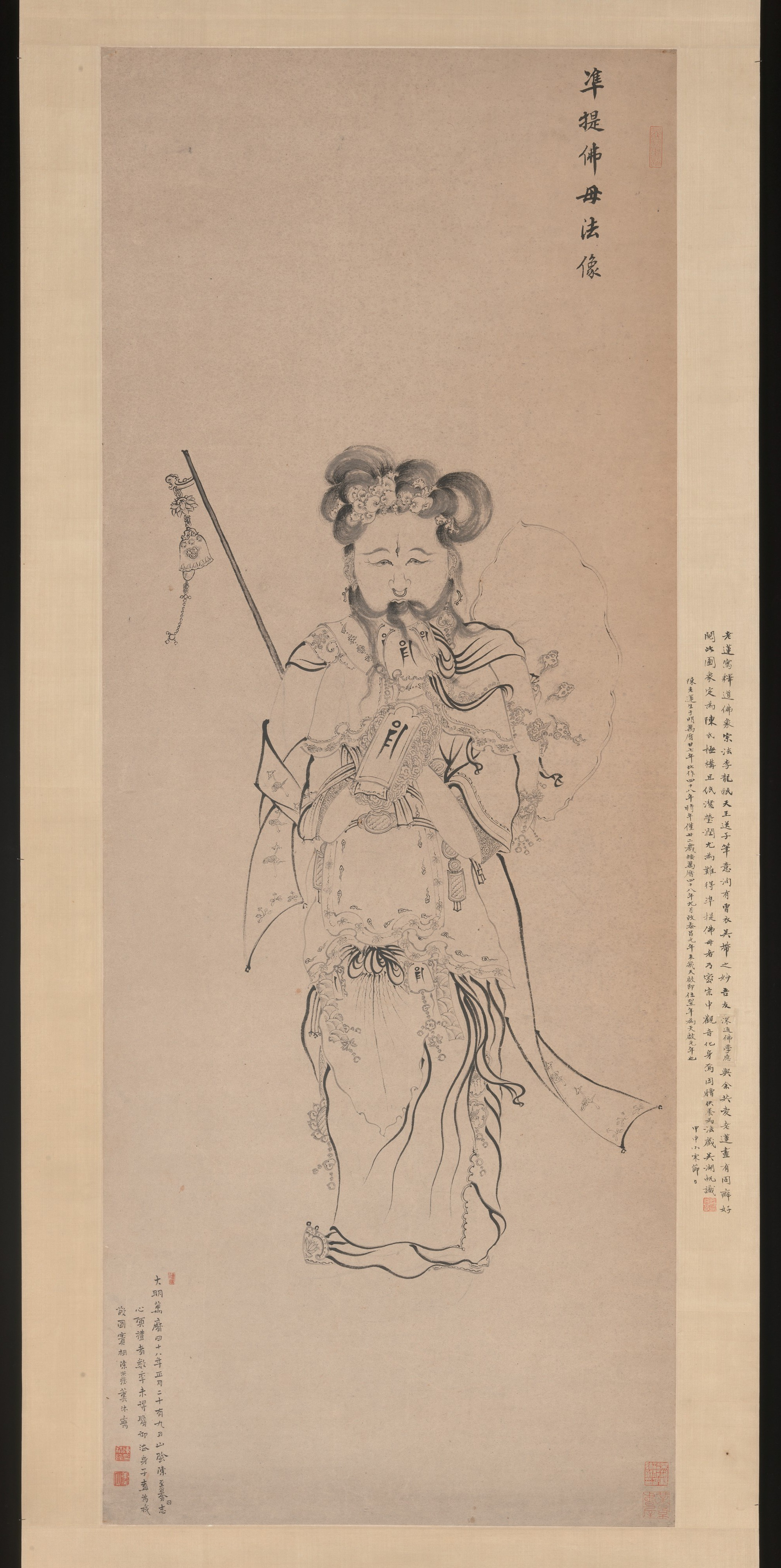
Bodhisattva Guanyin in the Form of the Buddha-Mother. Dated 1620, Ming dynasty. Metropolitan Museum of Art.

== See also ==
- List of Chinese painters
- Chinese painting
