= Four Books and Five Classics =

Core texts of Confucianism

Chinese name
- Traditional Chinese: 四書五經
- Simplified Chinese: 四书五经
- Hanyu Pinyin: Sìshū Wǔjīng
Transcriptions
Standard Mandarin
- Hanyu Pinyin: Sìshū Wǔjīng
- Bopomofo: ㄙˋ ㄕㄨ ㄨˇ ㄐㄧㄥ
- Gwoyeu Romatzyh: Syhshu Wuujing
- Wade–Giles: Ssŭ^{4} Shu^{1} Wu^{3} Ching^{1}'
- Yale Romanization: Sz̀shū Wǔjīng
- IPA: [sɹ̩̂.ʂú ù.tɕíŋ]
Wu
- Romanization: Si-sy ngo-king
Hakka
- Romanization: Si-su ng-gin
Yue: Cantonese
- Yale Romanization: Seisyū Nǵhgīng
- Jyutping: Sei3syu1 Ng5ging1
- IPA: [sēi.sýː ŋ̬̍.kéŋ]
Southern Min
- Hokkien POJ: Sù-su Ngó͘-keng
- Tâi-lô: Sù-su Ngóo-king
Middle Chinese
- Middle Chinese: Sìj-sho ngú-keng

Vietnamese name
- Vietnamese alphabet: Tứ thư Ngũ kinh
- Chữ Hán: 四書五經

Korean name
- Hangul: 사서오경
- Hanja: 四書五經
Transcriptions
- Revised Romanization: Saseoogyeong
- McCune–Reischauer: Sasŏogyŏng

Japanese name
- Kanji: 四書五経
- Kana: ししょごきょう
Transcriptions
- Romanization: Shisho Gokyō

The Four Books and Five Classics are authoritative and important books associated with Confucianism, written before 300 BC. They are traditionally believed to have been either written, edited or commented on by Confucius or one of his disciples. Starting in the Han dynasty, they became the core of the Chinese classics on which students were tested in the Imperial examination system.

== Four Books ==
The Four Books (四書; Sìshū) are Chinese classic texts illustrating the core value and belief systems in Confucianism. They were selected by intellectual Zhu Xi in the Song dynasty to serve as general introduction to Confucian thought, and they were, in the Ming and Qing dynasties, made the core of the official curriculum for the civil service examinations. More information of them are as follows:

=== List ===
Great Learning
Originally one chapter in the Book of Rites. It consists of a short main text attributed to Confucius and nine commentary chapters by Zengzi, one of the disciples of Confucius. Its importance is illustrated by Zengzi's foreword that this is the gateway of learning.
It is significant because it expresses many themes of Chinese philosophy and political thinking, and has therefore been extremely influential both in classical and modern Chinese thought.
Doctrine of the Mean
Another chapter in Book of Rites, attributed to Confucius's grandson Zisi. The purpose of this small, 33-chapter book is to demonstrate the usefulness of a golden way to gain perfect virtue. It focuses on the Way (道) that is prescribed by a heavenly mandate not only to the ruler but to everyone.
Analects
A compilation of speeches by Confucius and his disciples, as well as the discussions they held. Since Confucius's time, the Analects has heavily influenced the philosophy and moral values of China and later other East Asian countries as well. The Imperial examinations, started in the Sui dynasty and eventually abolished with the founding of the Republic of China, emphasized Confucian studies and expected candidates to quote and apply the words of Confucius in their essays.
Mencius
A collection of conversations of the scholar Mencius with kings of his time. In contrast to the sayings of Confucius, which are short and self-contained, the Mencius consists of long dialogues with extensive prose.

== Five Classics ==
The Five Classics (五經; Wǔjīng) are five pre-Qin Chinese books that form part of the traditional Confucian canon. Several of the texts were already prominent by the Warring States period. Mencius, the leading Confucian scholar of the time, regarded the Spring and Autumn Annals as being equally important as the semi-legendary chronicles of earlier periods. During the Western Han dynasty, which adopted Confucianism as its official ideology, these texts became part of the state-sponsored curriculum. It was during this period that the texts first began to be considered together as a set collection, and to be called collectively the "Five Classics".

=== List ===
Classic of Poetry
A collection of 305 poems divided into 160 folk songs, 105 festal songs sung at court ceremonies, and 40 hymns and eulogies sung at sacrifices to heroes and ancestral spirits of the royal house.
Book of Documents
A collection of documents and speeches alleged to have been written by rulers and officials of the early Zhou period and before. It is possibly the oldest Chinese narrative, and may date from the 6th century BC. It includes examples of early Chinese prose.
Book of Rites
Describes ancient rites, social forms and court ceremonies. The version studied today is a re-worked version compiled by scholars in the third century BC rather than the original text, which is said to have been edited by Confucius himself.
I Ching (Book of Changes)
The book contains a divination system comparable to Western geomancy or the West African Ifá system. In Western cultures and modern East Asia, it is still widely used for this purpose.
Spring and Autumn Annals
A historical record of the State of Lu, Confucius's native state, 722–481 BC attributed to Confucius.

The Classic of Music is sometimes considered the sixth classic but was lost.

Up to the Western Han, authors would typically list the Classics in the order Poems-Documents-Rituals-Changes-Spring and Autumn. However, from the Eastern Han the default order instead became Changes-Documents-Poems-Rituals-Spring and Autumn.

Authors and editors of later eras have also appropriated the terms "Book" and "Classic" and applied them ironically to compendia focused on patently crude or uncouth subject matter. Examples include the Classic of Whoring (Piaojing 嫖經) and Zhang Yingyu's A New Book for Foiling Swindles (Dupian Xinshu 杜騙新書, ca. 1617), which is known colloquially as The Book of Swindles or The Classic of Swindles.

== Authorship ==
Traditionally, it was thought that Confucius himself had compiled or edited the texts of the Five Classics. The scholar Yao Xinzhong allows that there are good reasons to believe that Confucian classics took shape in the hands of Confucius, but that "nothing can be taken for granted in the matter of the early versions of the classics." From the time of the Western Han dynasty, Yao continues, most Confucian scholars believed that Confucius re-collected and edited the prior works, thereby "fixing" the versions of the ancient writings which became the Classics. Confucian tradition believes that the Shijing collection was edited by Confucius from a collection of 3,000 pieces to its traditional form of 305 pieces. In the twentieth century, many Chinese scholars still held to this tradition. The New Confucian scholar, Xiong Shili (1885–1968), for instance, held that the Six Classics were the final versions "fixed up" by Confucius in his old age. Other scholars had and have different views. The Old Text School, for instance, relied on versions found in the Han dynasty which supposedly survived the Qin dynasty burning of the books but many of them held that these works had not been edited by Confucius but survived directly from the Zhou dynasty.

For quite different reasons, mainly having to do with modern textual scholarship, a greater number of twentieth century scholars both in China and in other countries hold that Confucius had nothing to do with editing the classics, much less writing them. Yao Xinzhong reports that still other scholars hold the "pragmatic" view that the history of the Classics is a long one and that Confucius and his followers, although they did not intend to create a system of classics, "contributed to their formation." In any case, it is undisputed that for over 2,000 years, Confucius was believed to have either written or edited these classics.

The most important events in the textual career of these classics were the adoption of Confucianism as state orthodoxy in the Han dynasty, which led to their preservation, and the "renaissance" of Confucianism in the Song dynasty, which led to their being made the basis of Confucian orthodoxy in the imperial examination system in the following dynasties. The Neo-Confucian sage Zhu Xi (1130–1200) fixed the texts of the Four Books and wrote commentaries whose new interpretations became accepted as being those of Confucius himself.

== Legacy ==
Under the reign of Emperor Wu of Han, the Five Classics and Four Books became the basis of the Imperial examination system.

== In Korea ==
In Korea, the expression 'Four Books and Three Classics' (Korean: 사서삼경; Hanja: 四書三經; RR: saseosamgyeong; MR: sasŏsamgyŏng) is also used. In the most common Korean usage, it denotes the Four Books together with Three Classics (Classic of Poetry, Book of Documents, and the I Ching), i.e., seven works in total.

== See also ==
- Chinese literature
- Thirteen Classics
- Daozang
- Daodejing
- Laozi
- Confucius
- Mencius
- Hanfeizi
- Gongsunlongzi
- Zhuangzi
- Liezi
- Wenzi
- Mozi

== Bibliography ==
- Kracke, E. A. Jr. (1967) [1957]. "Region, Family, and Individual in the Chinese Examination System". In Fairbank, John K. (ed.). Chinese Thoughts & Institutions. Chicago: University of Chicago Press.
