= Doctrine of the Mean =

Central doctrine of Confucianism

- "Doctrine of the Mean" in seal script (top) and modern (bottom) Chinese characters

Chinese name
- Chinese: 中庸
Transcriptions
Standard Mandarin
- Hanyu Pinyin: zhōngyōng
- Bopomofo: ㄓㄨㄥ ㄩㄥ
- Wade–Giles: Chung^{1} Yung^{1}
- IPA: [ʈʂʊ́ŋ.jʊ́ŋ]
Wu
- Romanization: Tzon-yon
Yue: Cantonese
- Yale Romanization: Jūngyùhng
- Jyutping: Zung1jung4
- IPA: [tsʊŋ˥.jʊŋ˩]
Southern Min
- Hokkien POJ: Tiong-iông
- Tâi-lô: Tiong-iông
Middle Chinese
- Middle Chinese: ʈjung-yong
Old Chinese
- Baxter–Sagart (2014): *truŋ loŋ

Vietnamese name
- Vietnamese alphabet: Trung Dung
- Chữ Hán: 中庸

Korean name
- Hangul: 중용
- Hanja: 中庸
Transcriptions
- Revised Romanization: Jungyong
- McCune–Reischauer: Chungyong

Japanese name
- Kanji: 中庸
- Kana: ちゅうよう
Transcriptions
- Romanization: Chūyō

Cover of a modern printed edition

The Doctrine of the Mean or Zhongyong is one of the Four Books of classical Chinese philosophy and a central doctrine of Confucianism. The text is attributed to Zisi, the only grandson of Confucius. It was originally a chapter in the Classic of Rites.

The phrase "doctrine of the mean" occurs in Book VI, verse 29 of the Analects of Confucius, which states:

The Master [Confucius] said, The virtue embodied in the doctrine of the Mean is of the highest order. But it has long been rare among people

— Analects, 6:29 (Burton Watson tr.)

The Analects never expands on what this term means, but Zisi's text, The Doctrine of the Mean, explores its meaning in detail, as well as how to apply it to one's life. The application of Confucian metaphysics to politics and virtue ethics. The text was adopted into the canon of the Neo-Confucian movement, as compiled by Zhu Xi.

While Burton Watson translated Zhōngyōng as Doctrine of the Mean, other English-language translators have rendered it differently. James Legge in 1861 called it Constant Mean, Pierre Ryckmans (aka Simon Leys) used Middle Way, while Arthur Waley chose Middle Use. Ezra Pound's translations include Unswerving Pivot and Unwobbling Pivot. Roger T. Ames and David L. Hall titled their 2001 translation Focusing the Familiar.

== Authorship ==
The authorship of The Doctrine of the Mean is controversial. Traditionally, authorship of the treatise (which was actually a chapter from Liji, one of the Five Classics of antiquity) was attributed to Zisi, a grandson of Confucius and disciple of Zeng Shen; however, this was first questioned by Qing dynasty scholar Cui Shu (1740–1816). According to some modern scholars parts of it may have been written or edited by Confucians during the transition from the Qin to Han dynasties. However, it is widely agreed that the book presents the ethical core of Confucian teachings. Others seem to attribute it to Confucius himself.

== Interpretation ==
The Doctrine of the Mean is a text rich with symbolism and guidance to perfecting oneself. The mean is also described as the "unswerving pivot" or zhongyong. Zhong means bent neither one way or another, and yong represents unchanging. In James Legge's translation of the text, the goal of the mean is to maintain balance and harmony from directing the mind to a state of constant equilibrium. The person who follows the mean is on a path of duty and must never leave it. A superior person is cautious, a gentle teacher and shows no contempt for their inferiors. The person always does what is natural according to their status in the world. Even common people can carry the mean into their practices, as long as they do not exceed their natural order.

The Doctrine of the Mean represents moderation, rectitude, objectivity, sincerity, honesty and propriety. The guiding principle is that one should never act in excess. The Doctrine of the Mean is divided into three parts:

1. The Axis – Confucian Metaphysics
2. The Process – Politics
3. The Perfect Word/Sincerity – Ethics (The Great Digest and Unwobbling Pivot, 1951).

== Guidelines ==
Doctrine of the Mean proposed three guidelines—Self-watchfulness, Leniency and Sincerity—for how to pursue the Doctrine of the Mean, and one who follows these guidelines can be called a respectable person:

"Zhong-ni said, 'The respectable person embodies the course of the Mean; the average person acts contrary to the course of the Mean."

=== Self-watchfulness ===
A page from the Doctrine of the Mean

This guideline requires self-education, self-questioning and self-discipline during the process of self-cultivation. This principle was exposited in the first chapter of Doctrine of the Mean:

"The respectable person does not wait till he sees things to be cautious, nor till he hears things to be apprehensive. There is nothing more visible than what is secret, and nothing more manifest than what is minute. Therefore the superior person is watchful over himself, when he is alone."

=== Leniency ===
This guideline requires understanding, concern and tolerance towards one another. Leniency was exposited in the 13th chapter:

"When one cultivates to the utmost the principles of his nature, and exercises them on the principle of reciprocity, he is not far from the path. What you do not like when done to yourself, do not do to others."

In this chapter, Confucius explained this guideline with four examples: "to serve my father, as I would require my son to serve me", "to serve my prince as I would require my minister to serve me", "to serve my elder brother as I would require my younger brother to serve me", "to set the example in behaving to a friend, as I would require him to behave to me."

=== Sincerity ===
Sincerity contributes to a close connection between Heaven and human. This guideline was exposited in the 23rd chapter:

"It is only he who is possessed of the most complete sincerity that can exist under heaven, who can give its full development to his nature. Able to give its full development to his own nature, he can do the same to the nature of other men. Able to give its full development to the nature of other men, he can give their full development to the natures of animals and things. Able to give their full development to the natures of creatures and things, he can assist the transforming and nourishing powers of Heaven and Earth. Able to assist the transforming and nourishing powers of Heaven and Earth, he may with Heaven and Earth form a ternion."

== In Chinese society ==
In pre-twentieth century China, the Doctrine of the Mean was integrated into the education system statewide. Also, one of the prerequisites for employment in the imperial government was the study and understanding of the Four Classics, included in this is the Doctrine of the Mean. The imperial state wanted to reinforce the three bonds of society; between the parent and child, husband and wife, and ruler and subject. This was believed to emphasize a peaceful home and an orderly state.

Recently in China, the New Confucians revisited the Classics, because of its strong foundation in the educational system. Using the Doctrine of the Mean has become a useful source for New Confucians due to the similarities in the terminology and expression used by them and found within the text. This is further reinforced by the support from ancient sages and worthies who prefer education systems more closely linked to traditional Confucian thought.

== Modern views ==
Sun Yat-sen critiqued the doctrine.

Chiang Kai-shek praised the doctrine as the book that introduced him to learning and as an essence of ancient Chinese learned thought.

According to Mao Zedong's comment on Ai Siqi's analysis of Doctrine of the Mean, Doctrine of the Mean is an eclecticism which simultaneously opposes the abolishment of exploitation and excessive exploitation. According to Mao, Doctrine of the Mean failed to realize that something deserves absolute negation, and in compromise, Doctrine of the Mean prevented China from progress. In his comment, Mao said that the Doctrine of the Mean also goes against dialectics as it stops qualitative change by emphasizing balance and harmony, maintaining contradictions past the point where they can be abolished.

On another occasion, Mao cited the Doctrine of the Mean, stating, "Being excessive is too left-leaning and being deficient means too right-leaning. We need to find an optimal status, which is what the Doctrine of the Mean suggests" and that "this thought is indeed a great discovery of Confucius [...] a great achievement, an important category of philosophy, and it deserves a good explanation."

Lu Xun, a leading figure of modern Chinese literature, saw Doctrine of the Mean as major contributing factor of the abject ethnic stereotype in modern China, believing it prevented reform from happening. In his speech Silent China, he said that Chinese likes the reconcilable and the compromised. "For example, people will not allow you to add a window to a dark room, but when you threaten to uncover the roof, they would compromise to the idea of adding a window. Without a radical proposal pushing them, Chinese won't permit even the mildest reform."

== Translation and study ==
Andrew H. Plaks wrote the essay "The mean, nature and self-realization. European translations of the Zhongyong", which was published in De l'un au multiple: Traductions du chinois vers les langues européenes. In his essay Plaks argues that since the text of the Doctrine of the Mean is "too easy", this factor is, as paraphrased by Joshua A. Fogel, an author of a book review for the De l'un au multiple book The Journal of Asian Studies, a "major impediment" to translation.

The Tsinghua bamboo slips feature the text "Bao xun" (保訓) which shares the topos of centrality with the Zhongyong.

== See also ==
- Golden mean (philosophy), a tenet of the philosophy of Aristotle, in which he endorses temperance between the extremes of excess and deficiency. Cf. Via media.
- Aristotle's Nicomachean Ethics Book II: That virtues of character can be described as means
- Argument to moderation (fallacy)
- Middle Way in Buddhism
- Naive dialecticism
- Phronesis in ancient Greek philosophy
- Wasat (Islamic term)
- Lagom, a similar Swedish philosophy
