= Zhen Dexiu =

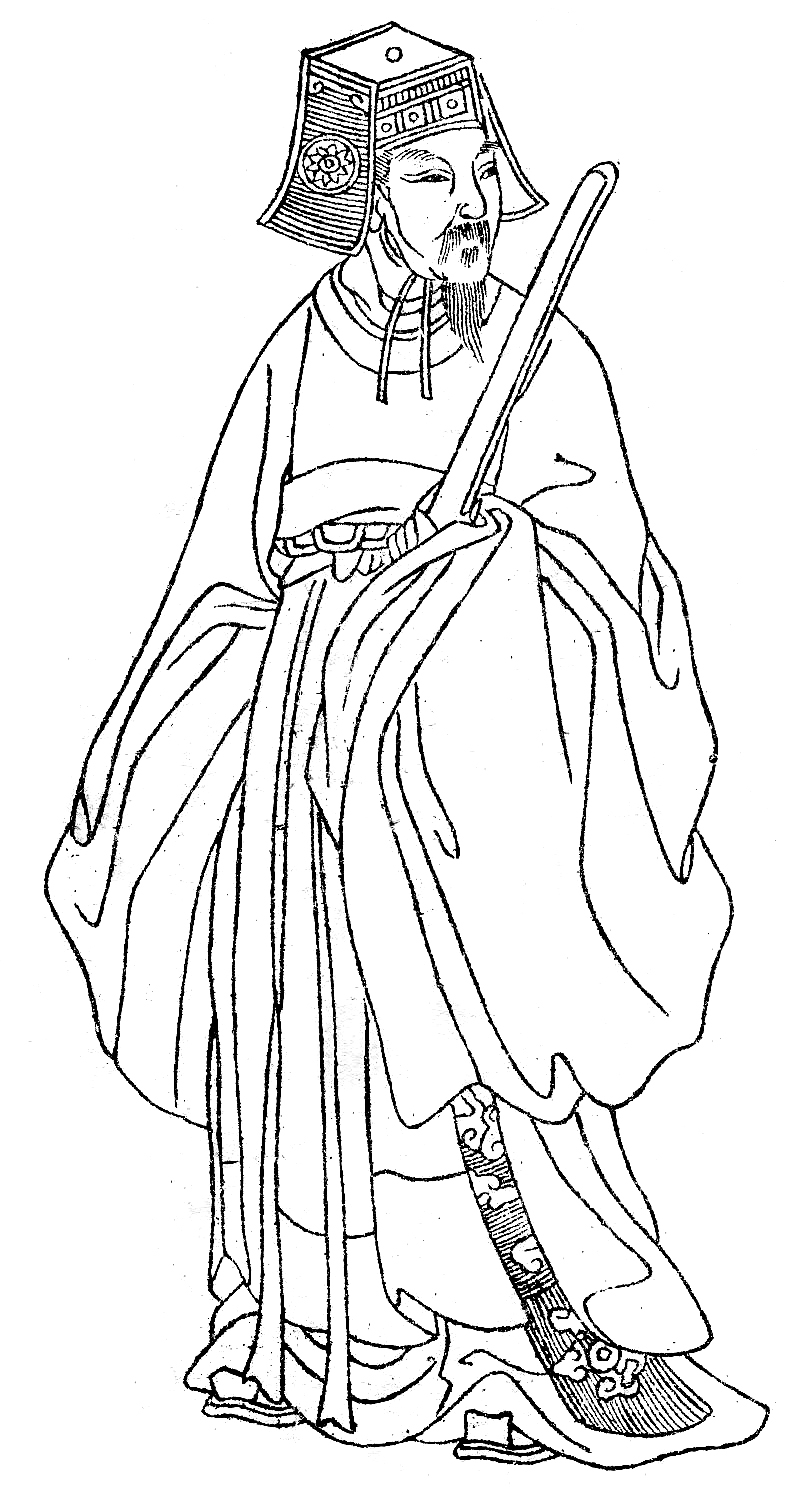
- Zhen Dexiu
- Born: 27 October 1178; Jian'ou, Pucheng, Nanping, China
- Died: 30 May 1235 (aged 56)
- Other names: Zhen Jingxi
- Occupations: Politician, philosopher
- Known for: Neo-Confucianism
- Notable work: Expanded Meaning of the Great Learning, Heart Mind Classic

Chinese name
- Chinese: 真德秀
Transcriptions
Standard Mandarin
- Hanyu Pinyin: Zhen Dexiu
- Wade–Giles: Chen Te-hsiu

Courtesy name
- Chinese: 真景元
Transcriptions
Standard Mandarin
- Hanyu Pinyin: Zhen Jingyuan
- Wade–Giles: Chen Ching-yüan

art name
- Chinese: 西山先生
Transcriptions
Standard Mandarin
- Hanyu Pinyin: Xishan xiansheng

Zhen Dexiu (Chinese: 真德秀; Wade–Giles: Chen Te-hsiu; 1178 – 1235) was a Chinese politician and philosopher during the Southern Song dynasty. His Neo-Confucianist views were influential at court and together with his colleague Wei Liaoweng he was instrumental in making Neo-Confucianism the dominant political philosophy of his time.

== Life and career ==
Zhen was born in Pucheng (now part of Fujian province). His original family name was Shen (慎), but was changed to Zhen (真) owing to the naming taboo of Emperor Xiaozong. He earned his jinshi qualification in 1199. He held a number of court positions, including Prefect of Quanzhou, Vice Minister of Rites, Minister of Revenue and eventually Vice Counsellor. He was also appointed to the Hanlin Academy. During the early part of his political career Zhen enjoyed the patronage of the Prime Minister Han Tuozhou, despite the latter's opposition to the Neo-Confucianist school of thought that Zhen represented (based on political rivalries with the Neo-Confucian philosopher Zhu Xi). It was not until Han Tuozhou's death that Zhen started to openly advocate the positions of Zhu Xi. Zhen was widely regarded among his peers as the successor to Zhu Xi's teaching, and was able to overturn the ban on the Cheng-Zhu school implemented during Han's premiership.

During the reign of Emperor Lizong, he was known for his uprightness and integrity. Shi Miyuan, then the prime minister, saw Zhen as a potential threat to his political monopoly and removed him from the imperial court. Zhen had not returned to the central government until Shi died. During this time, he served as government official in various counties while gaining positive reputation by the people. He died in the year of 1235, several years after his return to the court.

== Philosophy ==
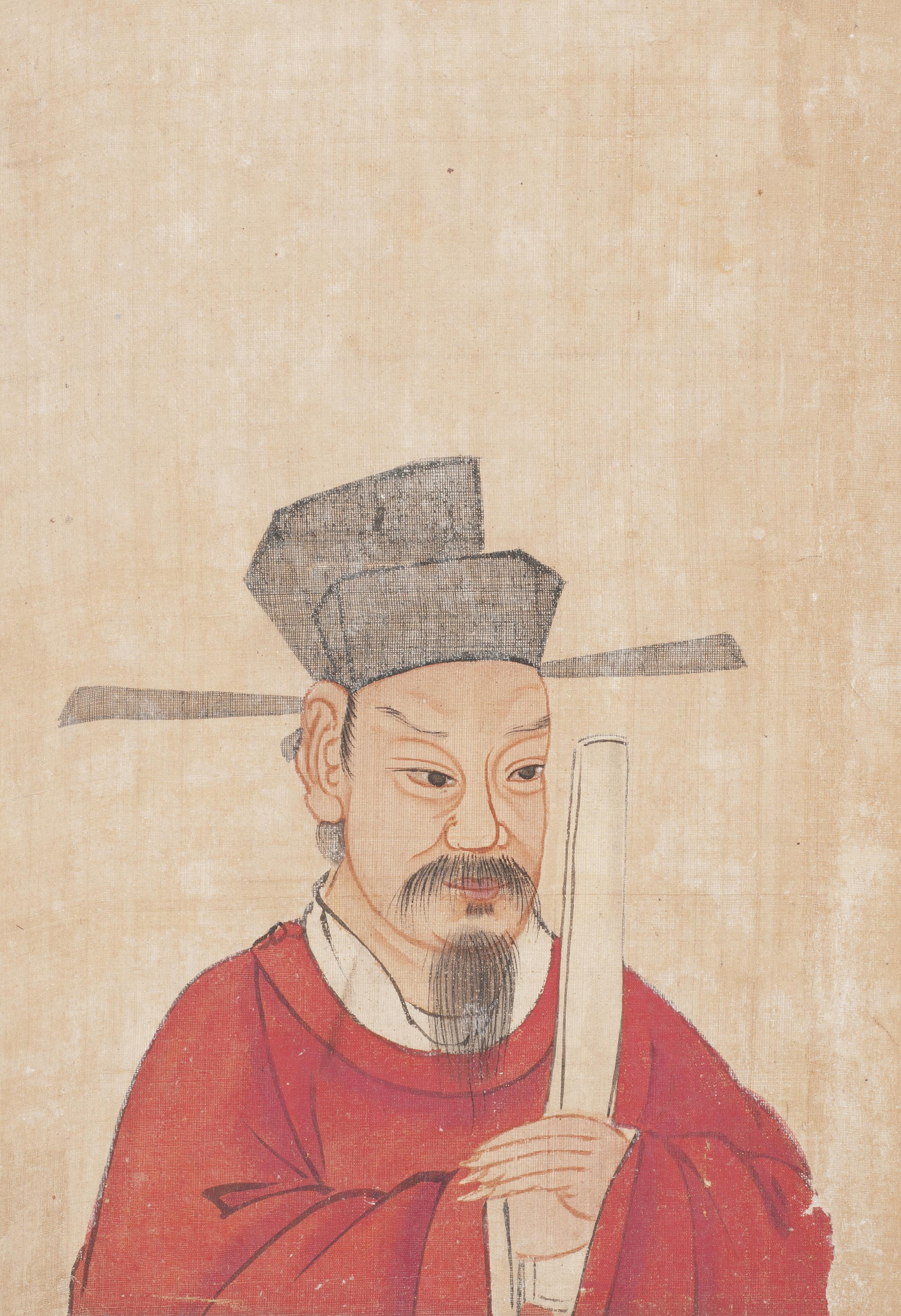
As depicted in the album Portraits of Famous Men c. 1900, housed in the Philadelphia Museum of Art

Zhen was a student of Zhan Tiren (himself a student of Zhu Xi's school), but adapted Zhan's philosophy to incorporate doctrinal elements of Daoism and Buddhism, modernising it and making it more palatable to the politicians of his day. He also included elements of Lu Jiuyuan's "School of the Universal Mind", despite the rivalry between this school and Zhu Xi's. As a result, Neo-Confucianism became the primary philosophy of the Southern Song court. His works continued to be influential long after his death; more than a century later, Song Lian was recommending Zhan's work to the Hongwu Emperor, the founding emperor of the Ming dynasty, who was so impressed that he had the text of Zhan's Expanded Meaning of the Great Learning copied onto the walls of his palace so he could review it daily.

The Sinologist Wm Theodore de Bary regarded Zhen's Heart Mind Classic as the quintessential expression of the Heart-Mind school of Neo-Confucianism, considering it to be Confucian equivalent to the Heart Sutra. In this work, Zhen advocated strict personal discipline and an ascetic lifestyle, focused on personal morality and social reform. He believed that the moral rectification of one's own spirit was the foundation of correct rulership, and felt that it was the duty of the courtiers to encourage the ruler's efforts in personal moral improvement.

Zhen's short primer Instructions for Children expounds his view on education, showing that he felt the purpose of education was to replace the wild nature of childhood with the dignity and respectability of adulthood as quickly as possible. Taking the form of a selection of short aphorisms and instructions, it was a popular text in schools for many years, though it fell out of favour after Western pedagogical methods were introduced to China.

Zhen also touched on literary criticism with his Writings of the Orthodox School, which addressed literature from a Daoist perspective. Unlike other literary critiques of the time, which classified writings in to as many as 100 categories, Zhen felt that there were only four major categories of literature: instruction, discussion, narration and poetry.

== List of works ==
- Expanded Meaning of the Great Learning (Daxue yanyi Chinese: 大學衍義)
- Heart Mind Classic (Xinjing Chinese: 心經)
- The Classic on Government (Zhengjing Chinese: 政經)
- Notes of the Secretariat (Du Shu ji Chinese: 讀書記)
- Writings of the Orthodox School (Wenzhang zhengzong Chinese: 文章正宗)
- Instructions for Children (Jiaozi zhaigui Chinese: 教子齋規)
- Collected works (Zhen Xishan quanji Chinese: 真西山全集)
