= Bai Hu Tong =

Confucian text based on White Tiger Hall Conference (79 CE)

- Chinese: 白虎通
- Literal meaning: White Tiger experts
Transcriptions
Standard Mandarin
- Hanyu Pinyin: Báihǔ Tōng
- IPA: [pǎɪxù tʰʊ́ŋ]
Middle Chinese
- Middle Chinese: /bˠæk̚ huo^{X} tʰuŋ/

Pages from a printed copy of Bai Hu Tong in the Shanghai Library

Bai Hu Tong (Chinese: 白虎通, also 白虎通義, 白虎通德論) is a Confucian text based on the White Tiger Hall Conference held in 79 CE.

== History ==
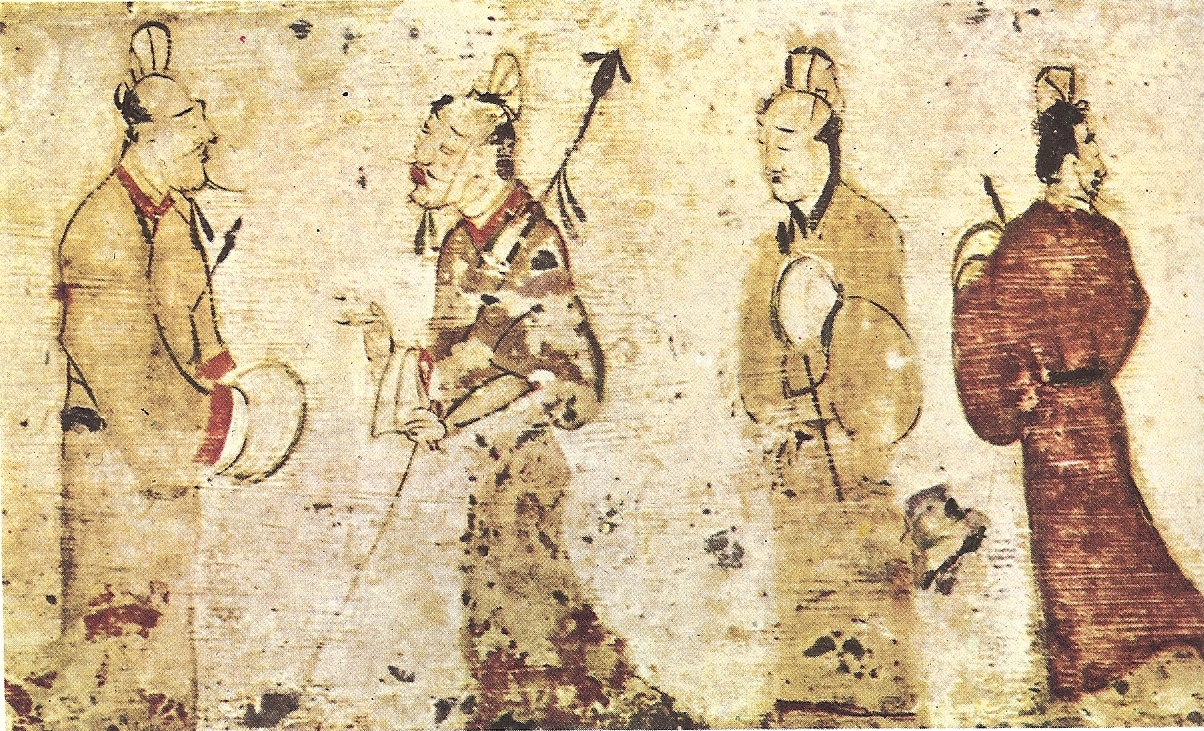
Men in conversation; from a tomb near Luoyang, dated to AD 25–220.

The traditional view of this text is that it was compiled by Ban Gu (32–92 CE) on the orders of the Emperor Zhang of Han (57-88 CE). The name is derived from the White Tiger Hall (白虎觀) in the Northern Palace of Luoyang (the capital) where a series of discussions took place in 79 CE, on the subject of the true meanings of the classics. The discussions covered a broad range of topics including rites, politics, cosmology, and philosophy. Ban Gu is said to have edited the records of these discussions, and from them to have produced the book we have today. Some scholars have suggested that the book may in fact be made up of material produced as late as the 3rd century CE, rather than being the product of Ban Gu's work in recording the discussions of 79.
