= Gao Chai =

Disciple of Confucius and government official (born 521 BC)

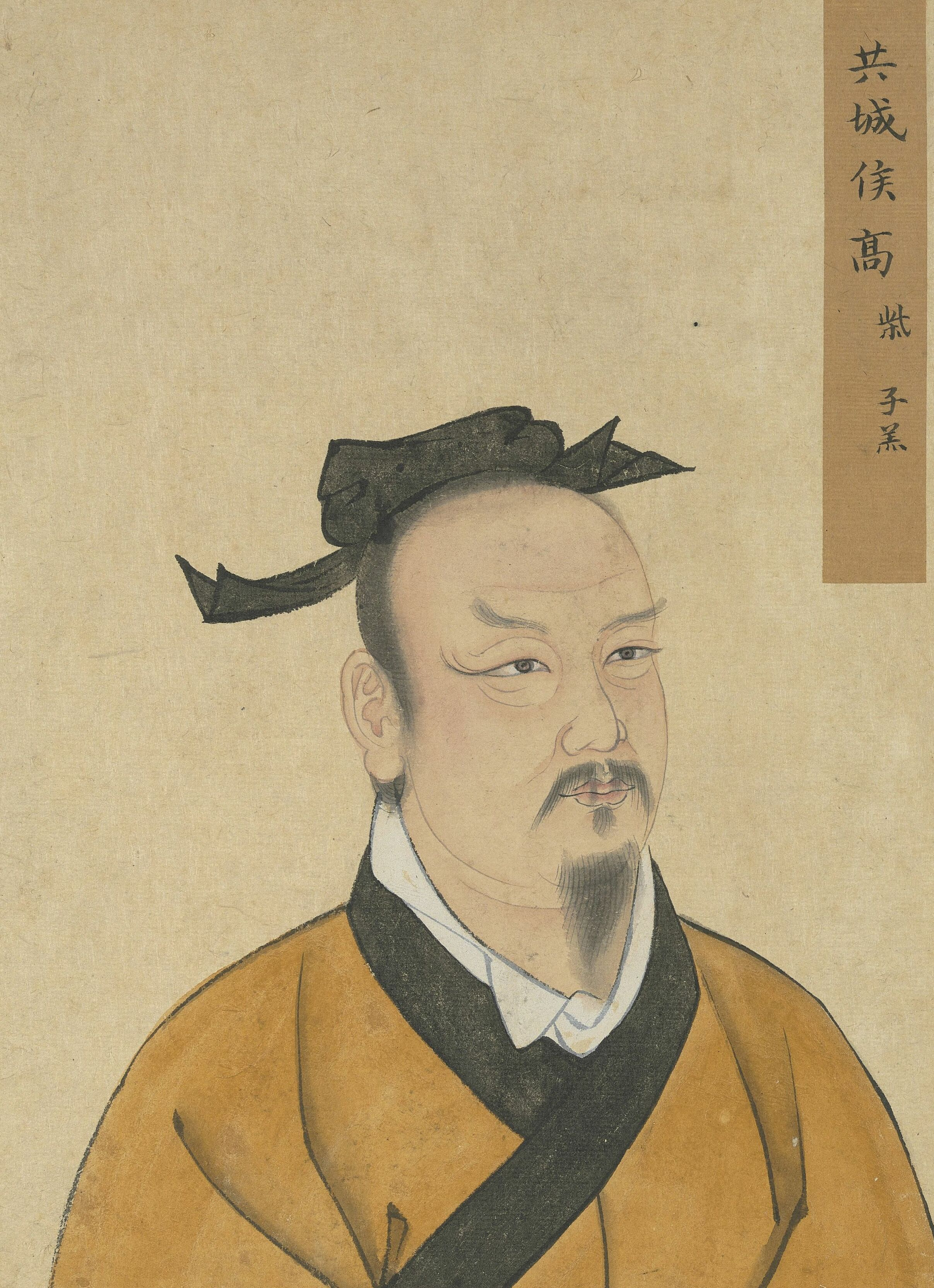
- Yuan dynasty portrait
- Born: 521 BC; State of Qi
- Occupations: Philosopher; Politician
- Known for: Disciple of Confucius, serving the states of Lu and Wey

Academic background
- Influences: Confucius

Academic work
- School or tradition: Confucianism

Chinese name
- Chinese: 高柴
Transcriptions
Standard Mandarin
- Hanyu Pinyin: Gāo Chái

Gao Chai (Chinese: 高柴; pinyin: Gāo Chái; Wade–Giles: Kao Ch'ai; born 521 BC), courtesy name Zigao (Chinese: 子羔/子皋; pinyin: Zǐgāo; Wade–Giles: Tzu-kao), was one of the major disciples of Confucius. Confucius considered him unintelligent because he was very short and ugly, but he served capably in the governments of the states of Lu and Wey.

== Life ==
Gao Chai was born in 521 BC, 30 years younger than Confucius. He was a native of the State of Qi, and a member of the noble house of Gao. He was said to be very ugly and dwarfish in stature, not even six chi tall (about 1.4 metres (4 ft 7 in)). Confucius considered him unintelligent, but he showed great ability as a governor.

Gao Chai served as a city magistrate in the State of Lu, and later accompanied Zilu, another prominent disciple of Confucius, to serve in the government of the neighbouring State of Wey. In 480 BC, Prince Kuaikui plotted a coup d'etat and took over the throne of Wey. Gao urged Zilu to flee from the turmoil, but Zilu, determined to protect his lord Kong Kui, refused and was killed. Gao Chai escaped to safety.

When Gao Chai served as a judge in Wey, he once condemned a criminal to the punishment of having his foot cut off. When he was later fleeing the state, the same man saved his life. Confucius praised Gao's ability to administer harsh justice with benevolence, so as to prevent resentment from the people he punished.

== Honours ==
In Confucian temples, Gao Chai's spirit tablet is placed in the outer court, beyond those of the Four Assessors and Twelve Wise Ones, and next to that of Gongxi Ai.

During the Tang dynasty, Emperor Xuanzong posthumously awarded Gao Chai the nobility title of Count of Gong (共伯). During the Song dynasty, Emperor Zhenzong further awarded him the title of Marquis of Gongcheng (共城侯).

== Bibliography ==
- Han, Zhaoqi (2010). "Biographies of the Disciples of Confucius". Shiji 史记 (in Chinese). Beijing: Zhonghua Book Company. ISBN 978-7-101-07272-3.
- Huang, Chichung, ed. (1997). The Analects of Confucius. Oxford University Press. ISBN 978-0-19-506157-4.
- Legge, James (2009). The Confucian Analects, the Great Learning & the Doctrine of the Mean. Cosimo. ISBN 978-1-60520-644-8.
