= Six Arts =

Education in Confucian philosophy

The Six Arts formed the basis of education in ancient Chinese culture. These were made and practiced by the Confucians.

== History ==
During the Zhou dynasty (1122–256 BCE), students were required to master the "liù yì" (六藝) (Six Arts):

- Archery
- Chariot
- Music
- Rite
- Calligraphy
- Mathematics

Men who excelled in these six arts were thought to have reached the state of perfection, becoming a perfect gentleman.

The Six Arts were practiced by scholars and existed before Confucius, but became a part of Confucian philosophy. As such, Xu Gan (170–217 CE) discusses them in the Balanced Discourses.

The Six Arts were practiced by the 72 disciples of Confucius.

The Six Arts concept developed during the pre-imperial period, and incorporated both military and civil components. In later times, the civil side was associated with the four arts of qin playing, weiqi (a board-game more widely known by its Japanese name, Go), calligraphy, and painting. However, the lattermost of these four was more of a leisure characteristic for the late imperial time. These four refined skillsets appear, at least superficially, to fit nicely within the Six Arts: the qin epitomized music, weiqi related to military strategy (a welcome addition to the practical skills of archery and chariotry), and calligraphy related closely to both literature and the aesthetic value of writing, as well as the cultivation of virtues or moral character (virtues necessary for perfecting Confucian social/religious rites).

== Influence ==
The emphasis on the Six Arts bred Confucian gentlemen, or Junzi, who knew more than just canonical scholarship. The requirement of students to master the Six Arts parallels the Western concept of the Renaissance man. The classical interest in practical scholarship invigorated Chinese mathematics, astronomy, and science (e.g. Liu Hui, Zu Chongzhi, Shen Kuo, Yang Hui, Zhu Shijie). This tradition receded after the Yuan dynasty (1271–1368), when neo-Confucianism underscored the importance of the Analects over the other arts and technical fields.

At the Guozijian (the Imperial University), law, math, calligraphy, equestrianism, and archery were emphasized by the Ming Hongwu Emperor in addition to the Confucian classics, and was also required for the Imperial Examinations. Archery and equestrianism were added to the exam by Hongwu in 1370, though archery and equestrianism were previously required even for non-military officials at the 武舉 College of War in 1162 by Song Emperor Xiaozong. The area around the Meridian Gate of Nanjing was used for archery by guards and generals under Hongwu.

By the Qing dynasty, Chinese specialists were not able to manage the lunar calendar accurately, and the calendar went out of phase with nature. This was a great embarrassment to the Chinese court, as the adherence to the lunar calendars by the vassal states was a recognition of the suzerainty of the Chinese court. Western astronomical expertise (see Jesuit China missions) was welcomed as an aftermath of Chinese interest in astronomy and mathematics, partially formulated in the classical Six Arts agenda.

== See also ==
- Junzi
- Chinese culture
- Confucian art
- Five Classics
- Seven liberal arts
- Taoism
