= Ren (philosophy) =

Highest Confucian virtue

Chinese name
- Chinese: 仁
Transcriptions
Standard Mandarin
- Hanyu Pinyin: rén
- Bopomofo: ㄖㄣˊ
- Wade–Giles: jen^{2}
- Tongyong Pinyin: rén
- IPA: [ɻə̌n]
Yue: Cantonese
- Yale Romanization: yàhn
- Jyutping: jan4
- IPA: [jɐn˩]
Southern Min
- Tâi-lô: jîn
Old Chinese
- Baxter–Sagart (2014): *niŋ

Vietnamese name
- Vietnamese: nhân
- Chữ Hán: 仁

Korean name
- Hangul: 인
- Hanja: 仁
Transcriptions
- Revised Romanization: in

Japanese name
- Kanji: 仁
Transcriptions
- Revised Hepburn: jin
- Kunrei-shiki: zin

Ren (Chinese: 仁, meaning "co-humanity" or "humaneness") is the highest Confucian virtue meaning the good quality of a virtuous human when reaching for higher ideals or when being altruistic. According to Confucius, Ren does not have a singular definition; it encompasses benevolence, trustworthiness, courage, compassion, empathy, and reciprocity. It is expressed through interpersonal relationships and can be cultivated through the observance of proper ritual (li). Ren is also a central principle in Confucian political theory: a ruler with the Mandate of Heaven is one of great virtue, who leads by moral example and prioritizes the well-being of the people.

== Etymology ==
The single logogram for ren is a composite of two distinct common hanzi, 人 (people or a person) and 二 (two), with 人 assuming its common form inside another character, to which various interpretations have been assigned. Internally ren can mean "to look up" meaning "to aspire to higher principles or ideals" and, externally one often hears that ren means "how two people should treat one another". While such folk etymologies are common in discussions of Chinese characters, they are often misleading.

In the case of ren—usually translated as "benevolence" or "humaneness"—humaneness is human-ness, the essence of being human. For Confucius, the interaction of a completely dependent infant and caring parent is the most emotionally charged human interaction, "To love a thing means wanting it to live...". The Way of humaneness is human interaction and, through shared experience, knowing one's family. "Fan Chi asked about humaneness. The Master said it is loving people. Fan Chi asked about wisdom. The Master said it is knowing people." In other words, human love and interaction is the source of humaneness, the source of the human self.

Other common interpretations of the graphical elements are 'Man' or 'a man is the connection' or 'the harmonization of Heaven and Earth'.

Pre-imperial epigraphic sources testify to alternative writings of the same character: 忎 (given as a variant of 仁 in the Shuowen dictionary), 身 with 心 below (⿱身心), and the latter compound with 人 on the right.

== Nature of ren ==
Ren has been translated as "benevolence", "perfect virtue", "goodness", or "human-heartedness". When asked, Confucius once defined it by the ordinary Chinese word for love, ai, saying that it meant to "love others". However, when probed by disciples as to the true definition of Ren, the Master provided varied answers depending on the circumstances and his audience. It can be "to love others", "to be respectful, tolerant, trustworthy, and kind", to have "courage" and "to be free from worry", and more importantly, to show empathy when dealing with others. In Confucius's words: "wishing to be established himself, seeks also to establish others; wishing to be enlarged himself, he seeks also to enlarge others." Ren is the highest among all Confucian virtues.

Ren includes traits that are a part of being righteous, such as: xìn (信), meaning to make one's words complement one's actions; lǐ (禮), which means to properly perform everyday rituals; jìng (敬), meaning conviction and seriousness; and yì (義), which means righteousness. When all these qualities are present, then one can truly be identified as a junzi (君子), or "superior man"—a morally superior human being.

Ren relies heavily on the relationships between two people, but at the same time encompasses much more than that. It represents an inner development towards an altruistic goal, while simultaneously realizing that one is never alone, and that everyone has these relationships to fall back on, being a member of a family, the state, the world, and ultimately the Tao. As such, Ren is manifested in one's behaviors and treatment of others, and can be achieved by practicing proper ritual in the day to day human interactions. Confucius once said, "Is goodness out of reach? As soon as I long for goodness, goodness is at hand." Ren is close to man and never leaves him.

Ren is the basis of Confucian political theory. Confucians held that government should be led by a junzi—a person of virtue—who governs by moral example and prioritizes the welfare of the people above all else. According to the Confucian classics, the Mandate of Heaven is neither fated nor absolute; it responds to the wishes and interests of the people, with moral character being a primary determinant of an emperor’s right to rule. While virtuous and benevolent rulers can maintain the Mandate, wicked rulers would be abandoned by Heaven and lose the Mandate.

== Principles of li, ren, and yi ==
The principle of ren is related to the concepts of li and yi. Li is often translated as ritual, rites, or ritual propriety; yi as righteousness.

Li, or ritual, guides people's behaviors in nurturing and expressing Ren. Li regulates the fundamental human relationships between parents and kids, spouses, siblings, and friends, and sets the foundation to a harmonious society. Yan Hui, one of the Four Sages, once asked his master to describe the criteria of ren. Confucius replied, "If contrary to ritual, do not look; if contrary to ritual, do not listen; if contrary to ritual, do not speak; if contrary to ritual, do not act." Further, Confucius holds that ritual practice must be accompanied by sincerity so that one's "inner feelings and outer demeanors become one".

Li is the outward expression of Confucian ideals, while ren is both the inward and outward expressions of those same ideals. According to Hopfe and Woodward: "Basically, li seems to mean 'the course of life as it is intended to go'. Li also has religious and social connotations. When a society lives by li, it moves smoothly: men and women respect their elders and superiors; the proper rituals and ceremonies are performed; everything and everyone is in its proper place."

In Confucianism, the concept of yi is closely related to ren, which is based upon the idea of reciprocity. The term yi contrasts with action done out of self-interest or profitableness (利). While pursuing one's own self-interest is not necessarily bad, one would be a better, more righteous person if one's life was based upon following a path designed to enhance the greater good. Thus an outcome of yì is doing the right thing for its own sake, without regarding the material gains.

== See also ==
- Disciples of Confucius

== Bibliography ==
- Fung Yu-lan (1952). A History of Chinese Philosophy, Vol.1 The Period of the Philosophers. George Allen & Unwin Ltd. ISBN 978-0-691-02021-1.
- Gardner, Daniel K. (2014). Confucianism: a very short introduction. Oxford: Oxford Univ. Press. ISBN 978-0-19-539891-5.
- Woo, Terry Tak-ling (2019). "Chinese & Korean Traditions". In Amore, Roy C.; Hussain, Amir; Oxtoby, Willard Gurdon (eds.). World religions: Eastern traditions (5th ed.). Oxford New York: Oxford University Press. ISBN 978-0-19-087549-7.
