= Zichang (disambiguation) =

Zichang is a city in Yan'an Shaanxi, China.

Zichang (Wade–Giles: Tzu-ch'ang) is also the courtesy name of:

- Gongye Chang, disciple of Confucius
- Sima Qian (145/135 – 86 BC), Han dynasty historian
