= Shaozheng Mao =

Chinese scholar (6th century BC)

Shaozheng Mao, was a Lu state Taifu in the 6th century BC.

== Biography ==
'Shaozheng' is his official title while Mao is his given name. Some historical records document that Shaozheng Mao is an erudite scholar. Except Yan Hui, all the three thousand disciples of Confucius were attracted to attend his lectures several times. Confucius became a minister of Lu state about 501 BC, and citing his 'five crimes', each worth execution, including concealed evilness, stubborn abnormality, eloquent duplicity, erudition in bizarre facts and generosity to evildoers, he managed to order the execution of Shaozheng Mao by 497BC. The incident was first mentioned in Xunzi: Youzuo, which was about three centuries later from the time of Confucius, causing doubt about its authenticity among Confucianists. The incident was also documented in Records of the Grand Historian but not in earlier sources like Zuo Zhuan and Guoyu.
