= Four arts =

Traditional accomplishments of Chinese scholars

The four arts (simplified Chinese: 四艺; traditional Chinese: 四藝; pinyin: Sìyì), or the four arts of the Chinese scholar, were the four main academic and artistic talents required of the aristocratic ancient Chinese scholar-gentleman. They were the mastery of the qin (the guqin, a stringed instrument, 琴), qi (the strategy game of Go, 棋), shu (Chinese calligraphy, 書) and hua (Chinese painting, 畫), and are also referred to by listing all four: 琴棋書畫; qínqíshūhuà.

== Origin of the concept ==
Although the individual elements of the concept have very long histories as activities befitting a learned person in ancient Chinese history, the earliest written source putting the four together is Zhang Yanyuan's 9th century Fashu Yaolu (Compendium of Calligraphy) from the Tang dynasty.

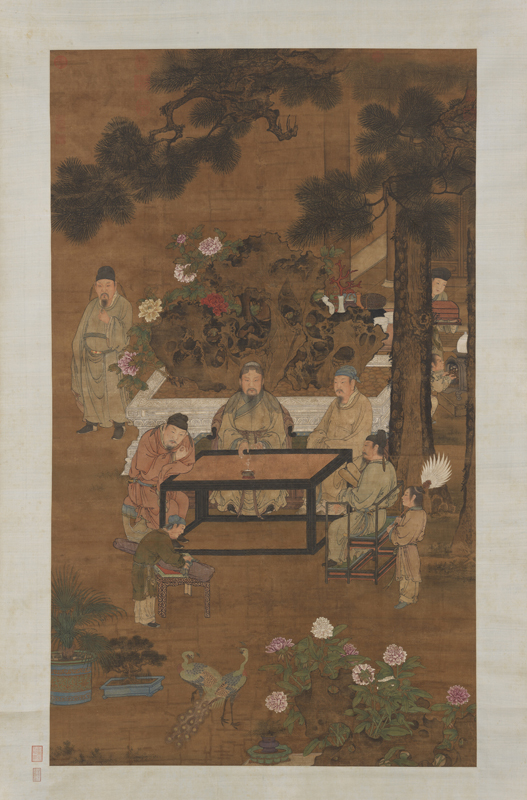
Qin

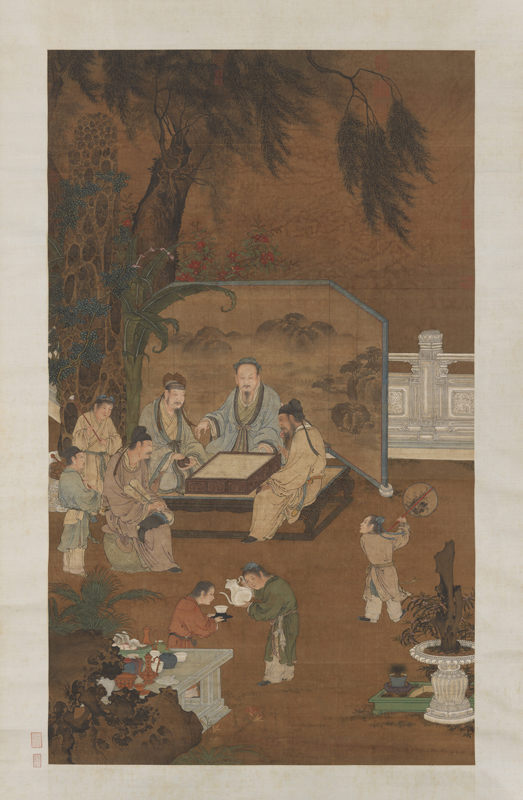
Weiqi (Go)

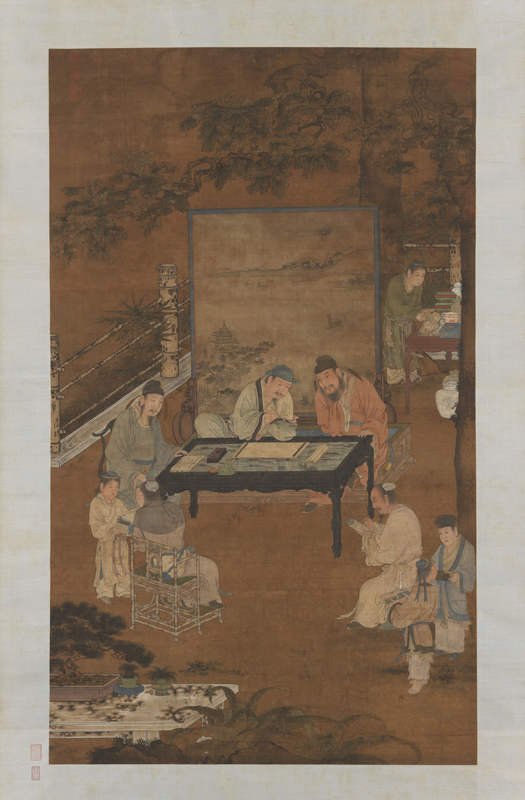
Calligraphy

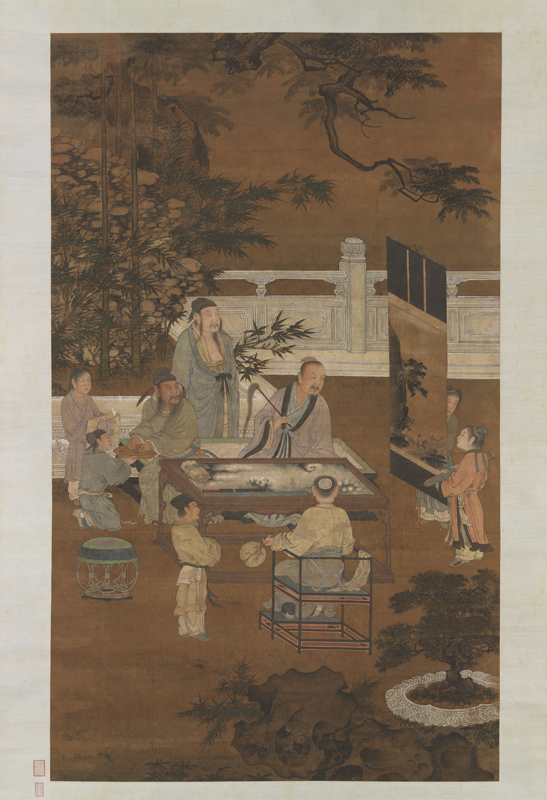
Painting

== Qin (琴) ==
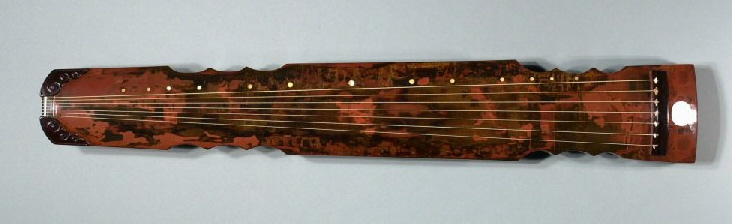
The guqin

The qin (琴) was defined as the musical instrument of the literati and represented the instrument now commonly known as the guqin, after the Chinese character qin has come to refer to other types of stringed instruments.

The guqin is a seven-stringed zither that owes its invention to ancient Chinese society some 3,000 years ago. During the Imperial Chinese period, a scholar was expected to play the guqin. Guqin was explored as an art-form as well as a science, and scholars strove to both play it well and to create texts on its manipulation. As an example, Gǔqín notation was invented some 1,500 years ago, and to this day it has not been drastically changed, while modern books may contain musical pieces written and mastered more than 500 years ago. Guqin is so influential that it even made its way into space: a recording of a guqin piece named "Flowing Water" was included along with other representative music styles of the Earth's peoples on the Voyager Golden Record attached to the spacecraft Voyager launched by the United States in 1977. The fact that the guqin's name breaks down to gu (old) and qin (musical instrument) reveals the instrument's great antiquity.

== Qi (棋) ==
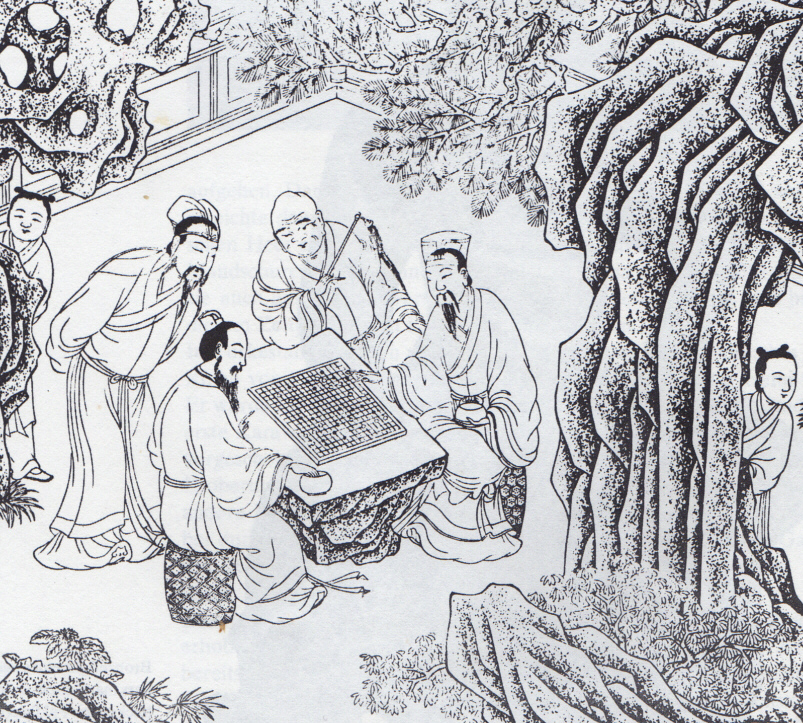
A Ming dynasty print of wéiqí players

The qi (棋) was defined as the board game now called weiqi (圍棋) in Chinese (Go in Japan and the West), literally meaning "surrounding game". Current definitions of qi cover a wide range of board games, and given that in classical Chinese qí could also refer to other games, some argue that the qí in the four arts could refer to xiangqi. However, xiangqi is often considered a popular "game of the people," whereas weiqi was a game with aristocratic connotations.

Many theories exist regarding the origin of weiqi in Chinese history. One of these holds that it was an ancient fortune-telling device used by Chinese cosmologists to simulate the universe's relationship to an individual. Another suggests that the legendary Emperor Yao invented it to enlighten his son. Certainly, the game of weiqi had begun to take hold around the 6th century BCE when Confucius mentioned wéiqí in his Analects 17:22.

Weiqi is a game in which two players take turns placing black and white stones on a board consisting of a grid of 19x19 lines. Stones are placed on the intersections of the grid. Once placed on the board, stones may not be moved, but stones may be removed if a stone or group of stones is surrounded on four sides by stones of the opposing color occupying all orthogonally-adjacent points. The two players place stones alternately until they reach a point at which neither player wishes to make another move; the game has no set ending conditions beyond this. At the conclusion of the game, it is scored by counting the territory encircled by each side (empty space along with captured stones) and the number of stones remaining on the board to determine the winner. Games may also be won by resignation.

Ancient weiqi texts are prized among modern Chinese weiqi professionals, as seen below in the translation of an ancient strategy book:

The most celebrated (though not the oldest) go manual is the Chinese Xuanxuan Qijing. It was published in 1349 by Yan Defu and Yan Tianzhang. The former was a strong go player and the latter (no relation) a collector of old go books. They made a perfect team. The title of the book is literally The Classic of the Mystery of the Mysterious, but it is an allusion to Chapter 1 of Lao Tzu's Tao Te Ching where the reference goes on to say that the mystery of the mysterious is 'the gateway to all marvels'. I prefer that as a title, especially as it is made clear in the preface that this latter phrase is meant to be called to mind, and is meant to imply that the book offers the way to mastering marvels in the form of go tesujis.

— Defu & Tianzhang & Fairbairn, 1

== Shu (書) ==
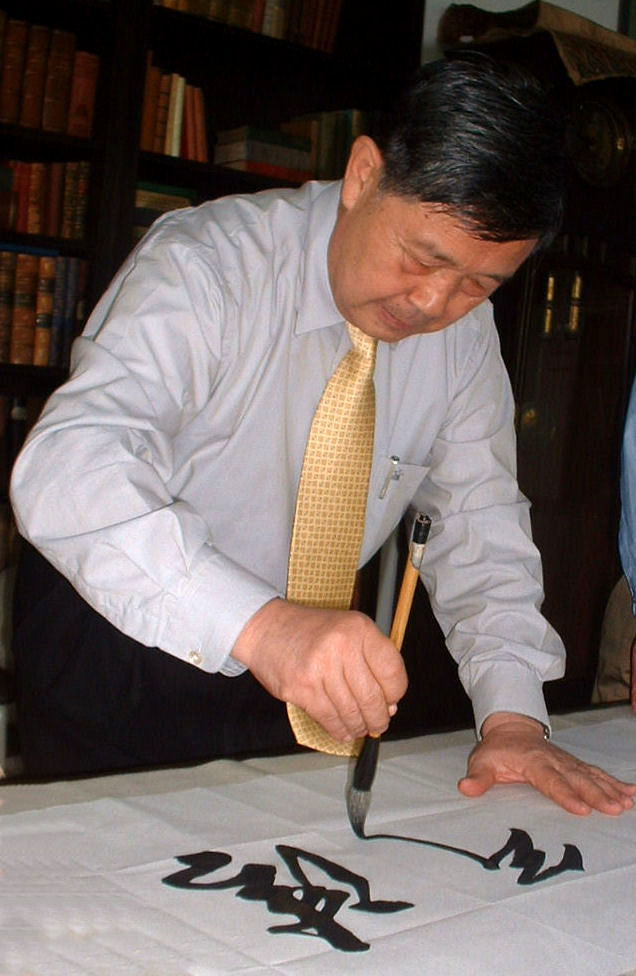
A Chinese calligrapher

Shu (書) refers to Chinese calligraphy, which dates to the origins of recorded Chinese history, in essence ever since written characters have existed. Chinese calligraphy is said to be an expression of a practitioner's poetic nature, as well as a significant test of manual dexterity. Chinese calligraphy has evolved for thousands of years, and its state of flux stopped only when Chinese characters were unified across the empire. Chinese calligraphy differs from western calligraphic script in the sense that it was done with a brush instead of metal implements or a quill. Calligraphy was the art by which a scholar could compose his thoughts to be immortalized. It was the scholar's means of creating expressive poetry and sharing his or her own learnedness.

Calligraphic process is also structured in the same way as weiqi. A minimalist set of rules conveys a system of incredible complexity and grandeur. Every character from the Chinese scripts is built into a uniform shape by means of assigning it a geometric area in which the character must occur. Only three basic forms are used in the creation of the character, those being square, triangle and circle. Each character has a set number of brushstrokes, none must be added or taken away from the character to enhance it visually, lest the meaning be lost. Finally, strict regularity is not required, meaning the strokes may be accentuated for dramatic effect or individual style. Calligraphy was the means by which scholars could mark their thoughts and teachings for immortality, and as such, represent some of the more precious treasures that can be found from ancient China.

The most valued of all art treasures in China have been examples of the writing of certain aristocrats from the fourth century CE, including casual notes exchanged between them. The process whereby this came about is a lengthy one. It had to do with religious developments in the third-seventh centuries. It was also connected intimately to the role of writing in upper class life, to notions of personality, and the visible expression of personality.[...] The notion of writing as an art form however probably does not appear until the early centuries of the common era. It is linked to the emergence of the idea of the artist as an individual whose personal qualities allow command of the technical resources to produce work of a higher quality and greater value [...] than that of the common run of writers.

— Clunas, 135

== Hua (畫) ==
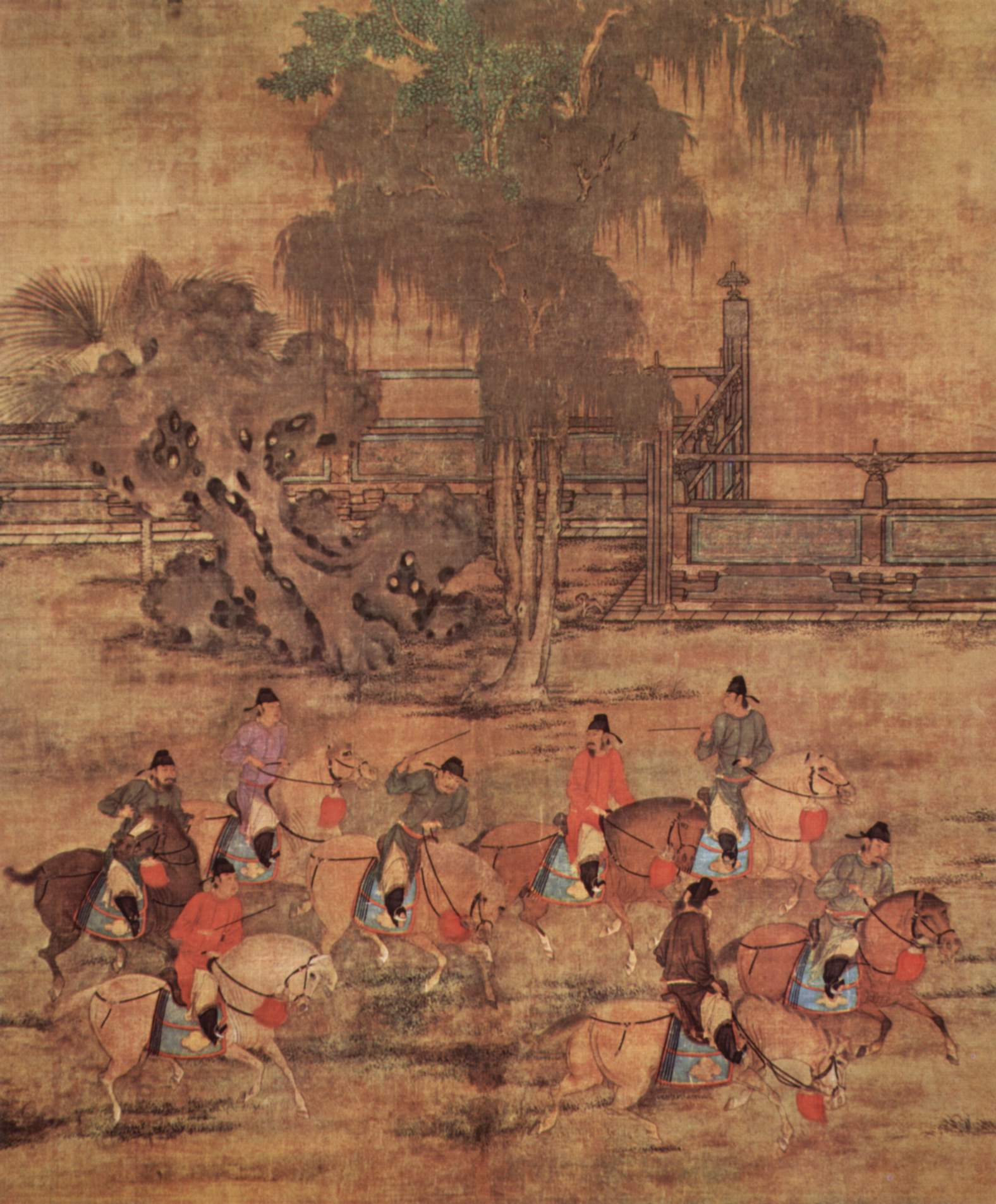
Eight horsemen in Spring, by Zhao Yan, 10th century, Five Dynasties and Ten Kingdoms period.

Hua 畫 refers to Chinese painting. Brush painting is the final art form that a scholar was expected to learn, and was arguably the greatest measure of individual creativity. Through painting a Chinese noble would demonstrate his mastery over the art of line. Often Chinese paintings would be produced on a sheet of plain white rice-paper or silk using nothing but black ink and a single brush. These paintings were made to demonstrate the power of a single line, and in them was reflected a skill that valued intentional and calculated strokes over instinctual erratic creation. In a Chinese painting was reflected the artist's ability to evaluate his own imagination and record it clearly and concisely. Chinese painting can be traced back even further than calligraphy. Some examples date back to the decorative paintings that were emblazoned on Neolithic pottery. To add tonal quality to paintings the artists would often paint portions of the subject then wash the cloth before continuing. This made for beautiful landscapes and depictions of ritual. Painting was the art by which a scholar could separate him or herself from the others and take a name.

The growing complexity of society at the end of the sixteenth century was reflected in an enriched cultural life in which heterogeneous tastes supported a wide variety of artists and craftsmen: the presence of foreigners at court and increasing affluence, which made the merchants independent of the court and of the official class, were only two of the many factors which nurtured artistic diversity. Individuality also began to be considered an important quality in the painter; indeed, a small group of artists were even known as the "individualists".

— Tregear, 168

== See also ==
- Liberal arts education
- Quadrivium (arithmetic, geometry, music, and astronomy)
- Six Arts in pre-imperial China
