= Fu Buqi =

Disciple of Confucius (born 521 BC)

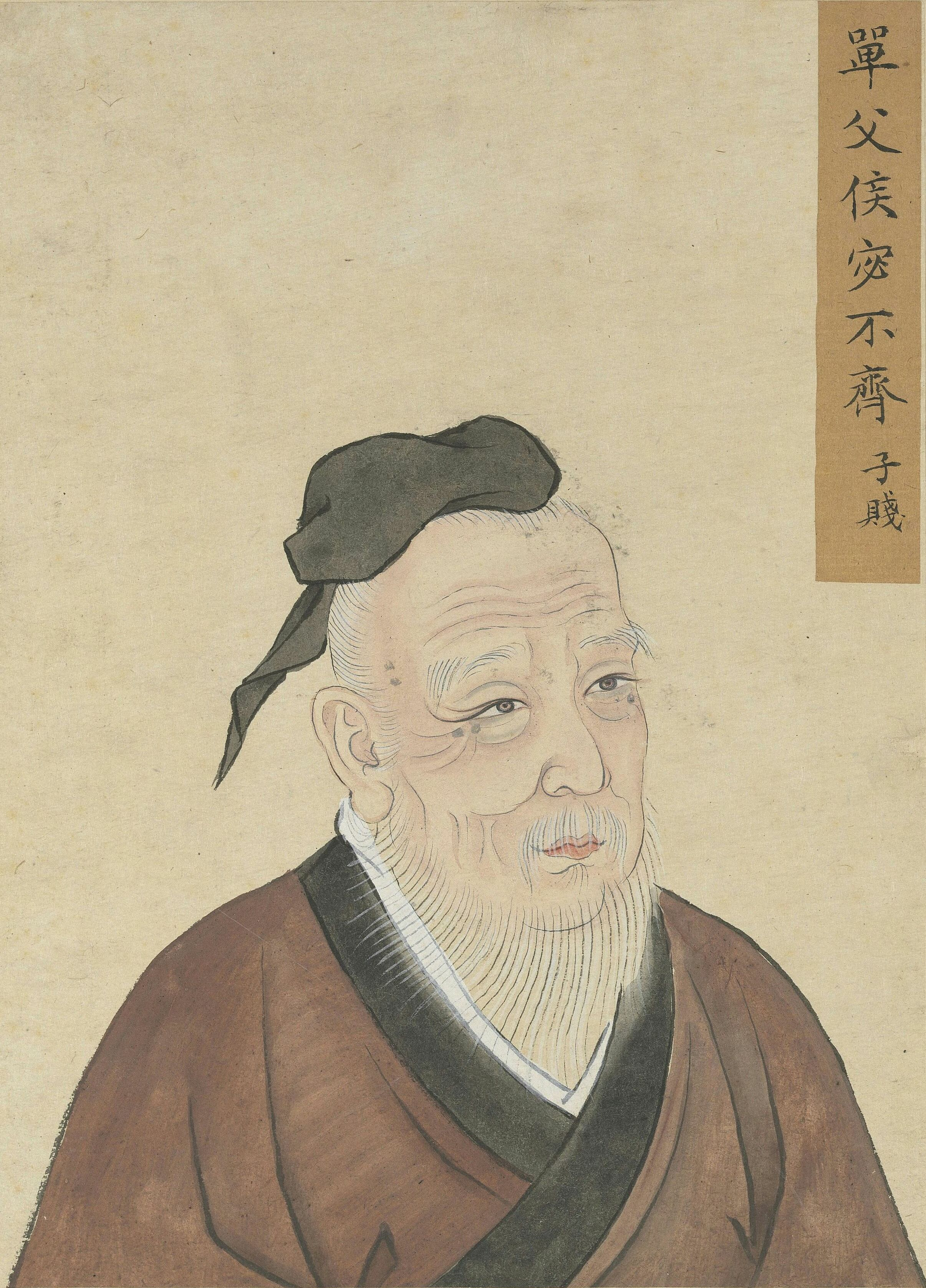
Fu Buqi

Fu Buqi (Chinese: 宓不齊; Wade–Giles: Fu Pu-ch'i; born 521 BC), also pronounced Mi Buqi, was a major disciple of Confucius. He was also known by his courtesy name Zijian (Chinese: 子賤; Wade–Giles: Tzu-chien). He was known as a capable governor and was also a writer.

== Life ==
According to the Records of the Grand Historian, Fu Buqi (Zijian) was born in 521 BC, 30 years younger than Confucius, He was from the State of Lu, Confucius' native state.

Fu Buqi served as magistrate of Shanfu County (present-day Shan County, Shandong) in Lu, and governed the county well without putting in much effort. Wuma Shi, another disciple of Confucius, had served in the same position and succeeded only with very hard work. Wuma asked Fu Buqi how he managed it so easily, Fu replied: "I employ men; you employ men's strength." Several ancient texts, including the Records of the Grand Historian, the Lüshi Chunqiu, and the Han Shi Waizhuan, record anecdotes demonstrating Fu Buqi's good governance.

Confucius praised Fu Buqi's governing ability, and thought he was fit for higher positions such as a king's or lord's adviser. In the Analects, Confucius called Fu Buqi a junzi (gentleman), and cited him as evidence of the high moral standard of the people of Lu. Throughout the Analects, Confucius praised only two of his disciples as junzi, the other being Nangong Kuo.

Fu Buqi was also a writer. His works were still extant during the late Western Han dynasty, and were included in Liu Xin's (50 BC – 23 AD) catalogue Qilüe (七略).

According to the Yanshi Jiaxun, Fu Sheng, the prominent Qin and Han dynasty scholar, was a descendant of Fu Buqi.

== Honours ==
In Confucian temples, Fu Buqi's spirit tablet is placed in the outer court, beyond those of the Four Assessors and Twelve Wise Ones.

During the Tang dynasty, Emperor Xuanzong posthumously awarded Fu Buqi the nobility title of Count of Shan (單伯). During the Song dynasty, he was further awarded the title of Marquis of Shanfu (單父侯).

== Bibliography ==
- Han, Zhaoqi (2010). "Biographies of the Disciples of Confucius". Shiji (史记) (in Chinese). Beijing: Zhonghua Book Company. ISBN 978-7-101-07272-3.
- Huang, Chichung, ed. (1997). The Analects of Confucius. Oxford University Press. ISBN 978-0-19-506157-4.
- Legge, James (2009). The Confucian Analects, the Great Learning & the Doctrine of the Mean. Cosimo. ISBN 978-1-60520-644-8.
- Mao, Zishui; Wang, Yunwu (1994). Lunyu Jinyi Jinzhu 論語今註今譯 (in Chinese). Taiwan Commercial Press. ISBN 978-957-05-0837-6.
- Slingerland, Edward (2003). Analects: With Selections from Traditional Commentaries. Hackett Publishing. ISBN 1-60384-345-0.
