= Confucius =

Chinese philosopher (c. 551 – c. 479 BCE)

- Fresco of Confucius from the Han dynasty
- Born: Kong Qiu c. 551 BCE; Zou, Lu (now Qufu, Shandong)
- Died: c. 479 BCE (aged 71–72); Si River, Lu
- Resting place: Cemetery of Confucius, Lu

Philosophical work
- Region: Chinese philosophy
- School: Confucianism
- Notable students: Disciples: Yan Hui; Zengzi
- Main interests: Ethics; education; music; political philosophy; social philosophy

Chinese name
- Chinese: 孔子
- Hanyu Pinyin: Kǒngzǐ
- Literal meaning: "Master Kong"
Transcriptions
Standard Mandarin
- Hanyu Pinyin: Kǒngzǐ
- Bopomofo: ㄎㄨㄥˇ ㄗˇ
- Wade–Giles: K'ung^{3}-tzŭ^{3}
- IPA: [kʰʊ̀ŋ.tsɹ̩̀]
Wu
- Romanization: Khon-tzy
Yue: Cantonese
- Yale Romanization: Húng Jí
- Jyutping: Hung2 Zi2
- IPA: [hʊŋ˧˥ tsi˧˥]
Southern Min
- Hokkien POJ: Khóng-chú
- Tâi-lô: Khóng-tsú
Middle Chinese
- Middle Chinese: khúwng tsí
Old Chinese
- Baxter (1992): *khongʔ tsɨʔ
- Baxter–Sagart (2014): *[k]ʰˤoŋʔ tsəʔ

Kong Qiu
- Chinese: 孔丘
- Hanyu Pinyin: Kǒng Qiū
Transcriptions
Standard Mandarin
- Hanyu Pinyin: Kǒng Qiū
- Bopomofo: ㄎㄨㄥˇ ㄑㄧㄡ
- Gwoyeu Romatzyh: Koong Chiou
- Wade–Giles: Kʻung^{3} Chʻiu^{1}
- Tongyong Pinyin: Kǒng Ciou
- Yale Romanization: Kǔng Chyōu
- IPA: [kʰʊ̀ŋ tɕʰjóʊ]
Wu
- Romanization: Khon Chieu
Hakka
- Romanization: Kung^{3} Hiu^{1}
Yue: Cantonese
- Yale Romanization: Húng Yāu
- Jyutping: Hung2 Jau1
- IPA: [hʊŋ˧˥ jɐw˥]
Southern Min
- Hokkien POJ: Khóng Khiu
- Tâi-lô: Khóng Khiu
Middle Chinese
- Middle Chinese: K^{h}úwng K^{h}juw
Old Chinese
- Baxter–Sagart (2014): *[k]ʰˤoŋʔ [k]ʷʰə

Second alternative Chinese name
- Chinese: 仲尼
- Hanyu Pinyin: Zhòngní
Transcriptions
Standard Mandarin
- Hanyu Pinyin: Zhòngní
- Bopomofo: ㄓㄨㄥˋ ㄋㄧˊ
- Wade–Giles: chung ni
Yue: Cantonese
- Yale Romanization: Juhng Nèih
- Jyutping: Zung6 Nei4
Middle Chinese
- Middle Chinese: drjuwngH nrij

Confucius (c. 551 – c. 479 BCE), born Kong Qiu, was a Chinese philosopher of the Spring and Autumn period who is traditionally considered the paragon of Chinese sages. Much of the shared cultural heritage of the Sinosphere originates in the philosophy and teachings of Confucius. His philosophical teachings, called Confucianism, emphasized personal and governmental morality, harmonious social relationships, righteousness, kindness, sincerity, and a ruler's responsibilities to lead by virtue.

Confucius considered himself a transmitter for the values of earlier periods which he claimed had been abandoned in his time. He advocated for filial piety, endorsing strong family loyalty, ancestor veneration, and the respect of elders by their children and of husbands by their wives. Confucius recommended a robust family unit as the cornerstone for an ideal government. He championed the Silver Rule, or a negative form of the Golden Rule, advising, "Do not do unto others what you do not want done to yourself."

The time of Confucius's life saw a rich diversity of thought, and was a formative period in China's intellectual history. His ideas gained in prominence during the Warring States period, but experienced setback immediately following the Qin conquest. Under Emperor Wu of Han, Confucius's ideas received official sanction, with affiliated works becoming mandatory readings for career paths leading to officialdom. During the Tang and Song dynasties, Confucianism developed into a system known in the West as Neo-Confucianism. In the 20th century, an intellectual movement emerged in the Republic of China that sought to apply Confucian ideology in a modern context, known as New Confucianism. From ancient dynasties to the modern era, Confucianism has integrated into the Chinese social fabric and way of life.

Traditionally, Confucius is credited with having authored or edited many of the ancient texts including all of the Five Classics. However, modern scholars exercise caution in attributing specific assertions to Confucius himself, for at least some of the texts and philosophy associated with him were of a more ancient origin. Aphorisms concerning his teachings were compiled in the Analects, but not until many years after his death.

== Name ==
The name "Confucius" is a Latinized form of the Mandarin Chinese Kǒngfūzǐ (孔夫子)—roughly meaning "Great Master Kong" or "Wise Teacher Kong"—that was coined in the late 16th century by early Jesuit missionaries to China. The more common name in Mandarin Chinese today is Kǒngzǐ (孔子), simply meaning "Master Kong". Confucius's family name was Kong (孔, OC:*‍kʰˤoŋʔ) and his given name was Qiu (丘, OC:*‍[k]ʷʰə). Qiu means "hill" or "mound" and was the given name because of his unusual head shape having a noticeable low depression or sunken (concave) in the top-middle of his head, while the sides rose up higher like the landscape of a valley and hill. His courtesy name, a capping (guan: 冠) given at his coming of age ceremony, and by which he would have been known to all but his older family members, was Zhongni (仲尼, OC:*‍N-‍truŋ-‍s nr[əj]), the "Zhòng" indicating that he was the second son in his family.

== Life ==
=== Early life ===
It is thought that Confucius was born on 28 September 551 BCE, in Zou (陬, in modern Qufu, Shandong). The area was de jure controlled by the kings of Zhou but effectively independent under the local lords of Lu, who ruled from the nearby city of Qufu. His father Kong He (or Shuliang He) was an elderly commandant of the local Lu garrison. His ancestry traced back through the dukes of Song to the Shang dynasty which had preceded the Zhou. Traditional accounts of Confucius's life relate that Kong He's grandfather had migrated the family from Song to Lu. Not all modern scholars accept Confucius's descent from Song nobility.

Kong He died when Confucius was three years old, and Confucius was raised by his mother Yan Zhengzai (顏徵在) in poverty. His mother later died at less than 40 years of age. At age 19, he married Qi Guanshi (亓官氏), and a year later the couple had their first child, their son Kong Li (孔鯉). Qiguan and Confucius later had two daughters together, one of whom is thought to have died as a child and one was named Kong Jiao (孔姣).

Confucius was educated at schools for commoners, where he studied and learned the Six Arts.

Confucius was born into the class of shi (士), between the aristocracy and the common people. He is said to have worked in various government jobs during his early 20s, and as a bookkeeper and a caretaker of sheep and horses, using the proceeds to give his mother a proper burial. When his mother died, Confucius (aged 23) is said to have mourned for three years, as was the tradition.

=== Political career ===
In Confucius's time, the state of Lu was headed by a ruling ducal house. Under the duke were three aristocratic families, whose heads bore the title of viscount and held hereditary positions in the Lu bureaucracy. The Ji family held the position "Minister over the Masses", who was also the "Prime Minister"; the Meng family held the position "Minister of Works"; and the Shu family held the position "Minister of War". In the winter of 505 BCE, Yang Hu—a retainer of the Ji family—rose up in rebellion and seized power from the Ji family. However, by the summer of 501 BCE, the three hereditary families had succeeded in expelling Yang Hu from Lu. By then, Confucius had built up a considerable reputation through his teachings, while the families came to see the value of proper conduct and righteousness, so they could achieve loyalty to a legitimate government. Thus, that year (501 BCE), Confucius came to be appointed to the minor position of governor of a town. Eventually, he rose to the position of Minister of Crime. The Xunzi says that once assuming the post, Confucius ordered the execution of Shaozheng Mao, another Lu state official and scholar whose lectures attracted the three thousand disciples several times except Yan Hui. Shaozheng Mao was accused of 'five crimes', each worth execution, including 'concealed evilness, stubborn abnormality, eloquent duplicity, erudition in bizarre facts and generosity to evildoers'.

Confucius desired to return the authority of the state to the duke by dismantling the fortifications of the city—strongholds belonging to the three families. This way, he could establish a centralized government. However, Confucius relied solely on diplomacy as he had no military authority himself. In 500 BCE, Hou Fan—the governor of Hou—revolted against his lord of the Shu family. Although the Meng and Shu families unsuccessfully besieged Hou, a loyalist official rose up with the people of Hou and forced Hou Fan to flee to the state of Qi. The situation may have been in favor for Confucius as this likely made it possible for Confucius and his disciples to convince the aristocratic families to dismantle the fortifications of their cities. Eventually, after a year and a half, Confucius and his disciples succeeded in convincing the Shu family to raze the walls of Hou, the Ji family in razing the walls of Bi, and the Meng family in razing the walls of Cheng. First, the Shu family led an army towards their city Hou and tore down its walls in 498 BCE.

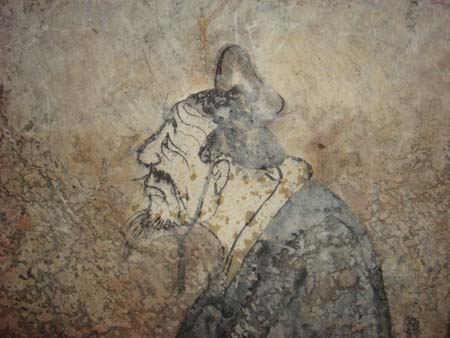
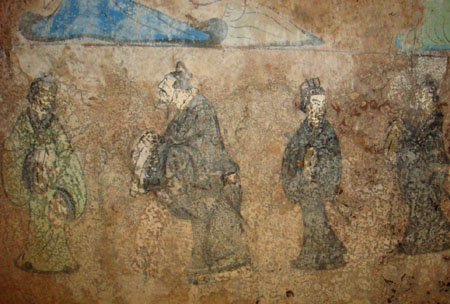
A Western Han (202 BCE – 9 CE) fresco depicting Confucius and Laozi, from a tomb of Dongping County, Shandong

Soon thereafter, Gongshan Furao, a retainer of the Ji family, revolted and took control of the forces at Bi. He immediately launched an attack and entered the capital Lu. Earlier, Gongshan had approached Confucius to join him, which Confucius considered as he wanted the opportunity to put his principles into practice but he gave up on the idea in the end. Confucius disapproved the use of a violent revolution by principle, even though the Ji family dominated the Lu state by force for generations and had exiled the previous duke. Creel states that, unlike the rebel Yang Hu before him, Gongshan may have sought to destroy the three hereditary families and restore the power of the duke. However, Dubs is of the view that Gongshan was encouraged by Viscount Ji Huan to invade the Lu capital in an attempt to avoid dismantling the Bi fortified walls. Whatever the situation may have been, Gongshan was considered an upright man who continued to defend the state of Lu, even after he was forced to flee.

During the revolt by Gongshan, Zhong You had managed to keep the duke and the three viscounts together at the court. Zhong You was one of the disciples of Confucius and Confucius had arranged for him to be given the position of governor by the Ji family. When Confucius heard of the raid, he requested that Viscount Ji Huan allow the duke and his court to retreat to a stronghold on his palace grounds. Thereafter, the heads of the three families and the duke retreated to the Ji's palace complex and ascended the Wuzi Terrace. Confucius ordered two officers to lead an assault against the rebels. At least one of the two officers was a retainer of the Ji family, but they were unable to refuse the orders while in the presence of the duke, viscounts, and court. The rebels were pursued and defeated at Gu. Immediately after the revolt was defeated, the Ji family razed the Bi city walls to the ground.

The attackers retreated after realizing that they would have to become rebels against the state and their lord. Through Confucius' actions, the Bi officials had inadvertently revolted against their own lord, thus forcing Viscount Ji Huan's hand in having to dismantle the walls of Bi—as it could have harbored such rebels—or confess to instigating the event by going against proper conduct and righteousness as an official. Dubs suggests that the incident brought to light Confucius' foresight, practical political ability, and insight into human character.

When it was time to dismantle the city walls of the Meng family, the governor was reluctant to have his city walls torn down and convinced the head of the Meng family not to do so. The Zuo Zhuan recalls that the governor advised against razing the walls to the ground as he said that it made Cheng vulnerable to Qi, and cause the destruction of the Meng family. Even though Viscount Meng Yi gave his word not to interfere with an attempt, he went back on his earlier promise to dismantle the walls.

Later in 498 BCE, Duke Ding of Lu personally went with an army to lay siege to Cheng in an attempt to raze its walls to the ground, but he did not succeed. Thus, Confucius could not achieve the idealistic reforms that he wanted including restoration of the legitimate rule of the duke. He had made powerful enemies within the state, especially with Viscount Ji Huan, due to his successes so far. According to accounts in the Zuo Zhuan and the Records of the Grand Historian, Confucius departed his homeland in 497 BCE after his support for the failed attempt of dismantling the fortified city walls of the powerful Ji, Meng, and Shu families. He left the state of Lu without resigning, remaining in self-exile and unable to return as long as Viscount Ji Huan was alive.

=== Exile ===
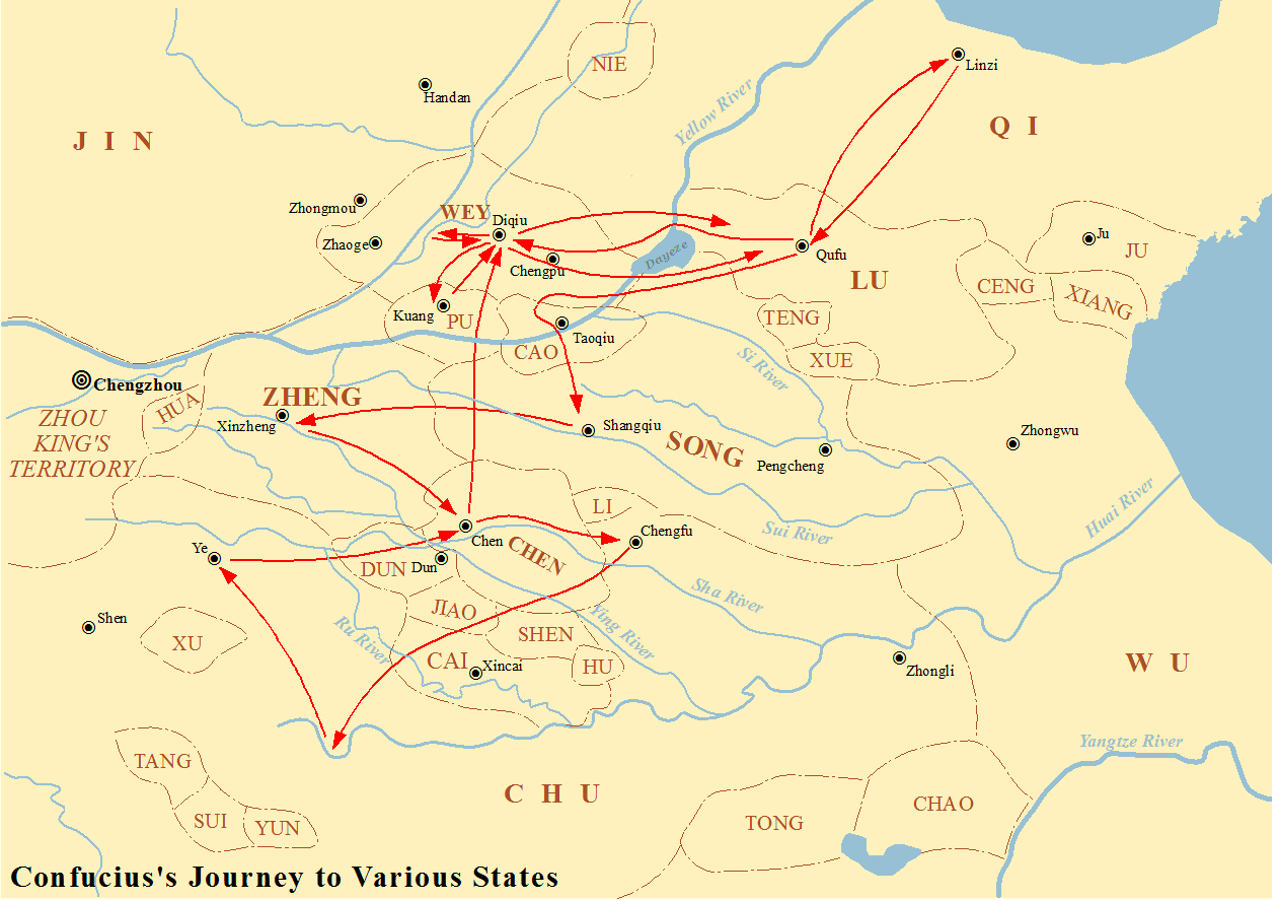
Map showing the journey of Confucius to various states between 497 BCE and 484 BCE

The Shiji stated that the neighboring Qi state was worried that Lu was becoming too powerful while Confucius was involved in the government of the Lu state. According to this account, Qi decided to sabotage Lu's reforms by sending 100 good horses and 80 dancing girls to the duke of Lu. The duke indulged himself in pleasure and did not attend to official duties for three days. Confucius was disappointed and resolved to leave Lu and seek better opportunities, yet to leave at once would expose the misbehavior of the duke and therefore bring public humiliation to the ruler Confucius was serving. Confucius therefore waited for the duke to make a lesser mistake. Soon after, the duke neglected to send to Confucius a portion of the sacrificial meat that was his due according to custom, and Confucius seized upon this pretext to leave both his post and the Lu state.

After Confucius's resignation, he travelled around the principality states of north-east and central China including Wey, Song, Zheng, Cao, Chu, Qi, Chen, and Cai (and a failed attempt to go to Jin). At the courts of these states, he expounded his political beliefs but did not see them implemented.

=== Return home ===
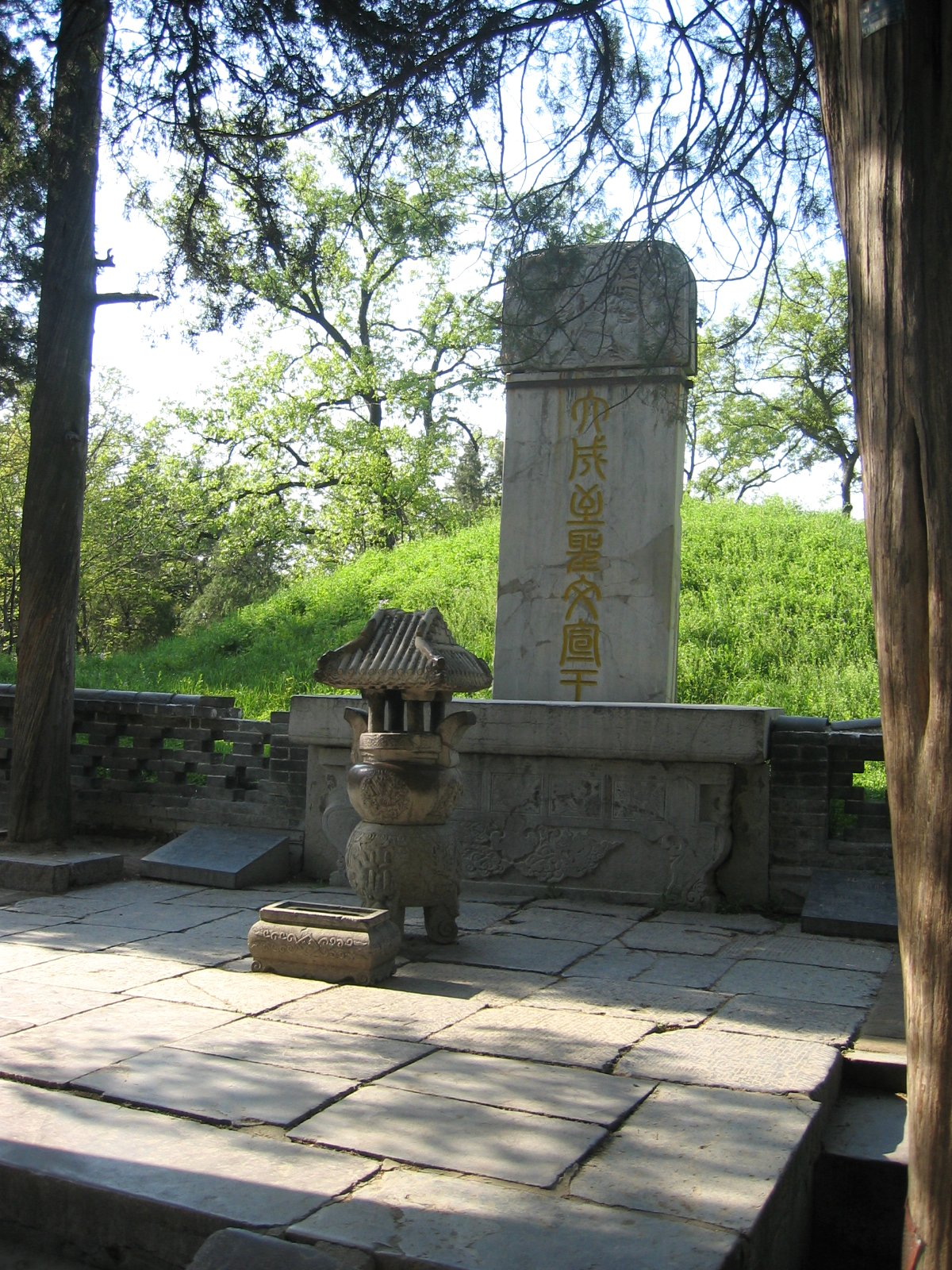
Tomb of Confucius in Kong Lin cemetery, Qufu, Shandong

According to the Zuozhuan, Confucius returned home to his native Lu when he was 68, after he was invited to do so by Ji Kangzi, the chief minister of Lu. The Shiji depicts him spending his last years teaching 3000 pupils, with 72 or 77 accomplished disciples that mastered the Six Arts. Meanwhile, Confucius dedicated himself in transmitting the old wisdom by writing or editing the Five Classics.

During his return, Confucius sometimes acted as an advisor to several government officials in Lu, including Ji Kangzi, on matters including governance and crime.

Burdened by the loss of both his son and his favorite disciples, he died at the age of 71 or 72 from natural causes. Confucius was buried on the bank of the Sishui River, to the north of Qufu City in Shandong Province. Starting as a humble tomb, the cemetery of Confucius had been expanded by emperors since the Han dynasty. To date, the Cemetery of Confucius (孔林) covers an area of 183 hectares with more than 100,000 graves of the Kong descendants, it is included in the World Heritage List for its cultural and architectural value.

== Philosophy ==
In the Analects, Confucius presents himself as a "transmitter who invented nothing". He puts the greatest emphasis on the importance of study, and it is the Chinese character for study (學) that opens the text. Far from trying to build a systematic or formalist theory, he wanted his disciples to master and internalize older classics, so that they can capture the ancient wisdoms that promotes "harmony and order", to aid their self-cultivation to become a perfect man. For example, the Annals would allow them to relate the moral problems of the present to past political events; the Book of Odes reflects the "mood and concerns" of the commoners and their view on government; while the Book of Changes encompasses the key theory and practice of divination.

Although some Chinese people follow Confucianism in a religious manner, many argue that its values are secular and that it is less a religion than a secular morality. Proponents of religious Confucianism argue that despite the secular nature of Confucianism's teachings, it is based on a worldview that is religious. Confucius was considered more of a humanist than a spiritualist, his discussions on afterlife and views concerning Heaven remained indeterminate, and he is largely unconcerned with spiritual matters often considered essential to religious thought, such as the nature of souls.

=== Ethics ===
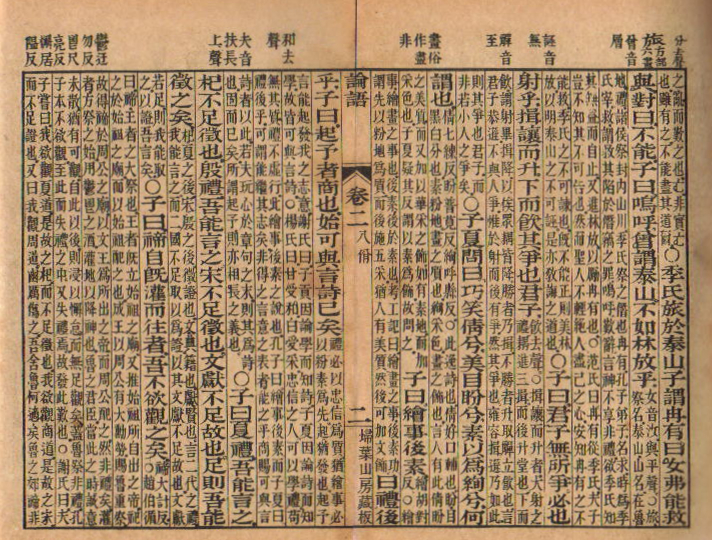
The Analects

One of the deepest teachings of Confucius may have been the superiority of personal exemplification over explicit rules of behavior. His moral teachings emphasized self-cultivation, emulation of moral exemplars, and the attainment of skilled judgment rather than knowledge of rules. Confucian ethics may, therefore, be considered a type of virtue ethics. His teachings rarely rely on reasoned argument, and ethical ideals and methods are conveyed indirectly, through allusion, innuendo, and even tautology. His teachings require examination and context to be understood. A good example is found in this famous anecdote:

廄焚。子退朝，曰：傷人乎？不問馬。

When the stables were burnt down, on returning from court Confucius said, "Was anyone hurt?" He did not ask about the horses.

— Analects X.11 (tr. Waley), 10–13 (tr. Legge), or X-17 (tr. Lau)

This remark was considered a strong manifestation of Confucius' advocacy in humanism.

One of his teachings was a variant of the Golden Rule, sometimes called the "Silver Rule" owing to its negative form:

子貢問曰：有一言而可以終身行之者乎？子曰：其恕乎！己所不欲、勿施於人。

Zi Gong [a disciple] asked: "Is there any one word that could guide a person throughout life?" The Master replied: "How about 'reciprocity'! Never impose on others what you would not choose for yourself."

— Analects XV.24, tr. David Hinton

Often overlooked in Confucian ethics are the virtues to the self: sincerity and the cultivation of knowledge. Virtuous action towards others begins with virtuous and sincere thought, which begins with knowledge. A virtuous disposition without knowledge is susceptible to corruption, and virtuous action without sincerity is not true righteousness. For Confucius, learning about ancient rituals, practices, music, social institutions, and relationship norms is both essential and the starting point for becoming a junzi. By "learning," Confucius refers to moral cultivation that transforms a student into a superior man, rather than the mere accumulation of knowledge.

The Confucian theory of ethics as exemplified in lǐ (禮) is based on three important conceptual aspects of life: (a) ceremonies associated with sacrifice to ancestors and deities of various types, (b) social and political institutions, and (c) the etiquette of daily behavior. Some believed that lǐ originated from the heavens, but Confucius stressed the development of lǐ through the actions of sage leaders in human history. His discussions of lǐ seem to redefine the term to refer to all actions committed by a person to build the ideal society, rather than those conforming with canonical standards of ceremony.

In the early Confucian tradition, lǐ was doing the proper thing at the proper time; balancing between maintaining existing norms to perpetuate an ethical social fabric, and violating them in order to accomplish ethical good. Training in the lǐ of past sages, cultivates virtues in people that include ethical judgment about when lǐ must be adapted in light of situational contexts.

In Confucianism, the concept of li is closely related to yì (義), which is based upon the idea of reciprocity. Yì can be translated as righteousness, though it may mean what is ethically best to do in a certain context. The term contrasts with action done out of self-interest or profitableness (利). While pursuing one's own self-interest is not necessarily bad, one would be a better, more righteous person if one's life was based upon following a path designed to enhance the greater good. Thus an outcome of yì is doing the right thing for its own sake, without regarding the material gains.

Just as action according to lǐ should be adapted to conform to the aspiration of adhering to yì, so yì is linked to the core value of rén (仁). Rén consists of five basic virtues: seriousness, generosity, sincerity, diligence, and kindness. Rén is the virtue of perfectly fulfilling one's responsibilities toward others, most often translated as "benevolence", "humaneness", or "empathy"; translator Arthur Waley calls it "Goodness" (with a capital G), and other translations that have been put forth include "authoritativeness" and "selflessness". Confucius's moral system was based upon empathy and understanding others, rather than divinely ordained rules. To develop one's spontaneous responses of rén so that these could guide action intuitively was even better than living by the rules of yì. Confucius asserts that virtue is a mean between extremes. For example, the properly generous person gives the right amount – not too much and not too little.

=== Politics ===
Confucius's political thought is based upon his ethical thought. He argued that the best government is one that rules through "rites" (lǐ) and morality, and not by using incentives and coercion. He explained that this is one of the most important analects: "If the people be led by laws, and uniformity sought to be given them by punishments, they will try to avoid the punishment, but have no sense of shame. If they be led by virtue, and uniformity sought to be given them by the rules of propriety, they will have the sense of the shame, and moreover will become good." (Analects 2.3, tr. Legge). This "sense of shame" is an internalization of duty. Confucianism prioritizes creating a harmonious society over the ruler's interests, opposes material incentives and harsh punishments, and downplays the role of institutions in guiding behavior as in Legalism, emphasizing moral virtues instead.

Confucius looked nostalgically upon earlier days, and urged the Chinese, particularly those with political power, to model themselves on earlier examples. In times of division, chaos, and endless wars between feudal states, he wanted to restore the Mandate of Heaven (天命) that could unify the "world" (天下, "all under Heaven") and bestow peace and prosperity on the people. Because his vision of personal and social perfections was framed as a revival of the ordered society of earlier times, Confucius is often considered a great proponent of conservatism, but a closer look at what he proposes often shows that he used (and perhaps twisted) past institutions and rites to push a new political agenda of his own: a revival of a unified royal state, whose rulers would succeed to power on the basis of their moral merits instead of lineage. These would be rulers devoted to the well-being of their people, striving to be a role model in virtue and ritual, and such a ruler would spread his own virtues to the people instead of imposing proper behavior with laws and edicts.

In discussing the relationship between a king and his subject (or a father and his son), he underlined the need to give due respect to superiors. This demanded that the subordinates must advise their superiors if the superiors are considered to be taking a course of action that is wrong. Confucius believed in ruling by example, if you lead correctly, orders by force or punishment are not necessary.

=== Music and poetry ===
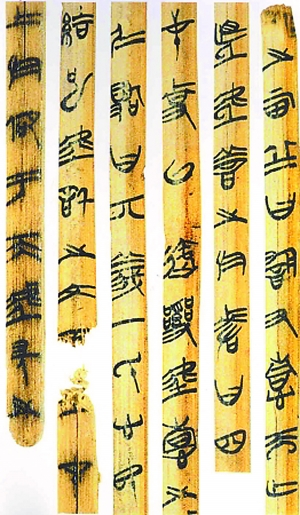
The Shijing or Classic of Poetry

Music was one of the six arts that students needed to master, together with archery, charioteering, mathematics, calligraphy, and a partner to music, the purpose of rituals. Confucius heavily promoted the use of music with rituals or the rites order. Unlike other philosophers around the world, Confucius viewed music and music theory beyond a mere art form or curriculum subject, and stated that it was intrinsically intertwined with rites in structuring man.

"Music is that which moves man from the internal; rites are that which affects man on the external. Music brings about harmony. Rites ensure obedience."

To Confucius, music created the focus necessary to unite and harmonize man. Thus, music and rites together were more than beneficial but were to make people act in a manner compatible with heaven and earth. The scholar Li Zehou argued that Confucianism is based on the idea of rites. Rites serve as the starting point for each individual and that these sacred social functions allow each person's human nature to be harmonious with reality. Given this, Confucius believed that "music is the harmonization of heaven and earth; the rites is the order of heaven and earth." Therefore, the application of music in rites creates the order that makes it possible for society to prosper.

The Confucian approach to music was heavily inspired by the Shijing or Classic of Poetry and the Classic of Music, which was said to be the sixth Confucian classic until it was lost during the Han dynasty. The Classic of Poetry serves as one of the current Confucian classics and is a book on poetry that contains a diversified variety of poems as well as poems meant for folk songs. Confucius is traditionally ascribed with compiling these classics within his school. In the Analects, Confucius described the importance of poetry in the intellectual and moral development of an individual:

The Master said, "My children, why do you not study the Book of Poetry?
The Odes serve to stimulate the mind.
They may be used for purposes of self-contemplation.
They teach the art of sociability.
They show how to regulate feelings of resentment.
From them you learn the more immediate duty of serving one's father, and the remoter one of serving one's prince.
From them we become largely acquainted with the names of birds, beasts, and plants."

Confucians in later generations had conservative and mixed views on international musical influences encroaching on China, in particular those with varying styles that did not traditionally accompany rites, and some preached against sentimental tendencies from the Persians, the Greco-Bactrians, and the Mongols.

== Legacy ==
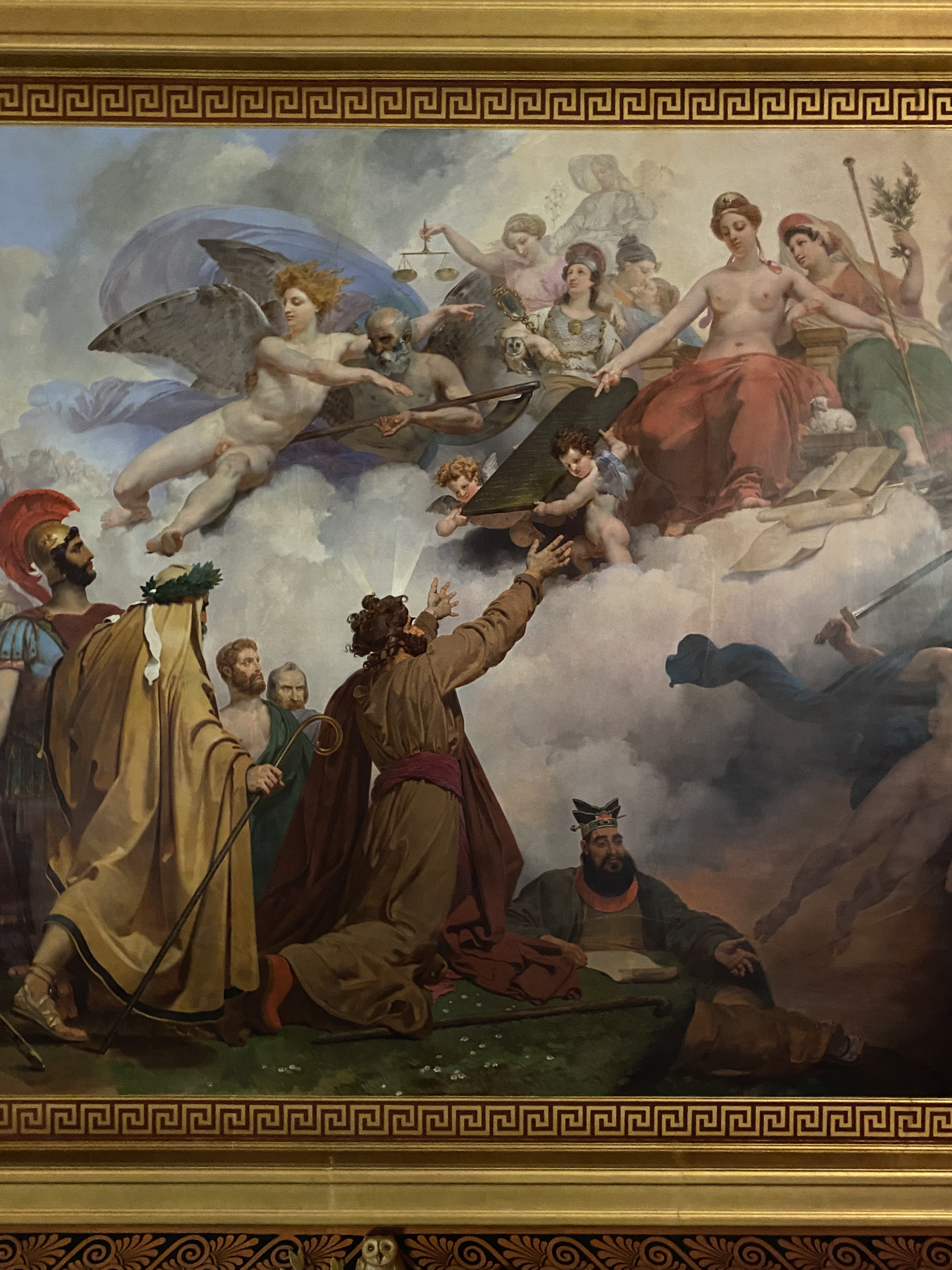
Confucius together with Moses and Muhammad among the greatest legislators of the past, by Jean-Baptiste Mauzaisse (1827), Louvre Palace

Confucius's teachings were later turned into an elaborate set of rules and practices by his numerous disciples and followers, who organized his teachings into the Analects. Confucius's disciples and his only grandson, Zisi, continued his philosophical school after his death. These efforts spread Confucian ideals to students who then became officials in many of the royal courts in China, thereby giving Confucianism the first wide-scale test of its dogma.

Two of Confucius's most famous later followers emphasized radically different aspects of his teachings. In the centuries after his death, Mencius (孟子) and Xunzi (荀子) both composed important teachings elaborating in different ways on the fundamental ideas associated with Confucius. Mencius (4th century BCE) articulated the innate goodness in human beings as a source of the ethical intuitions that guide people towards rén, yì, and lǐ, while Xunzi (3rd century BCE) underscored the realistic and materialistic aspects of Confucian thought, stressing that morality was inculcated in society through tradition and in individuals through training. In time, their writings, together with the Analects and other core texts came to constitute the philosophical corpus of Confucianism.

Towards the end of the Warring States periods, Legalism gained momentum amid the intensified power struggle. Considered an "antithesis of Confucian thinking", Legalism held that humanity and righteousness were not sufficient in government, and that rulers should instead rely on statecrafts, punishments, vigorous administration of law, and warfare. Legalism seemed to "win out over the other school of political thoughts" in 221 BCE when the Qin state conquered all of China and adopted legalism as its official doctrine. Li Si, Prime Minister of the Qin dynasty, convinced Qin Shi Huang to completely abolish feudal ranks and privileges of the Zhou dynasty, and to centralize power through the prefectures and county system.

It was not until the Han dynasty that Confucian teachings gained widespread prominence over other thinkers. Under Emperor Wu of Han, the works attributed to Confucius were made the official imperial philosophy and required reading for civil service examinations in 140 BCE which was continued nearly unbroken until the end of the imperial China in 1912. As Mohism lost support by the time of the Han, the main philosophical contenders were Legalism, which Confucian thought somewhat absorbed, the teachings of Laozi, whose focus on more spiritual ideas kept it from direct conflict with Confucianism, and the new Buddhist religion, which gained acceptance during the Southern and Northern Dynasties era. Both Confucian ideas and Confucian-trained officials were relied upon in the Ming dynasty and even the Yuan dynasty, although the Mongol rulers somewhat distrusted Confucian scholar-officials and excluded them from some of the top government positions.

During the Song dynasty, Confucianism was revitalized in a movement known as Neo-Confucianism. Neo-Confucianism was a revival of Confucianism that expanded on classical theories by incorporating metaphysics and new approaches to self-cultivation and enlightenment, influenced by Buddhism and Daoism. The most renowned scholar of this period was Zhu Xi. There are clear Buddhist and Daoist influences in the Neo-Confucian advocacy of "quiet sitting" (meditation) as a technique of self-cultivation that leads to transformative experiences of insight." In his life, Zhu Xi was largely ignored, but not long after his death, his ideas became the new orthodox view of what Confucian texts actually meant. Modern historians view Zhu Xi as having created something rather different and call his way of thinking Neo-Confucianism. Neo-Confucianism held sway in China, Japan, Korea, and Vietnam until the 19th century.

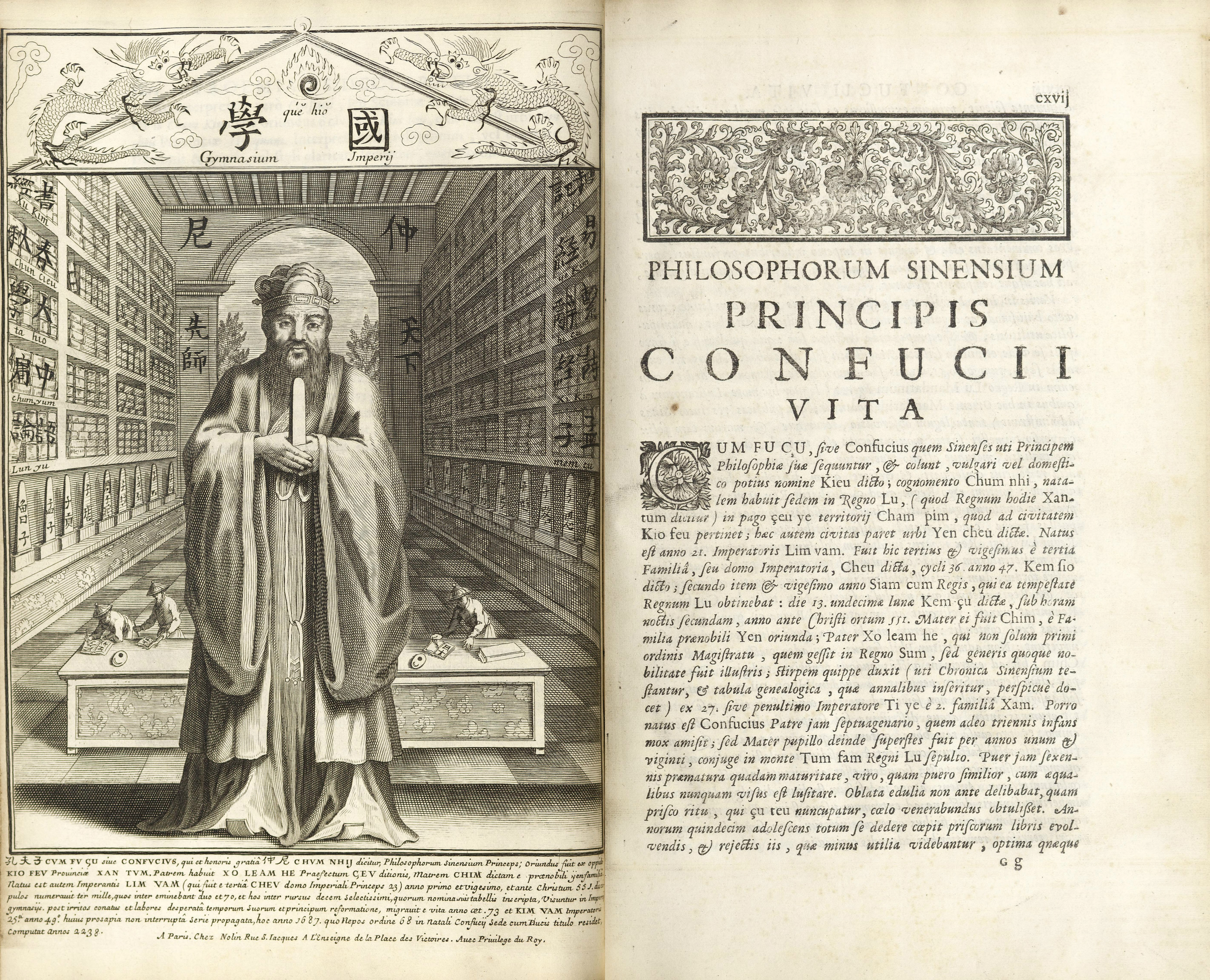
Confucius, Philosopher of the Chinese, published by Jesuit missionaries at Paris in 1687

The works of Confucius were first translated into European languages by Jesuit missionaries in the 16th century during the late Ming dynasty. The first known effort was by Michele Ruggieri, who returned to Italy in 1588 and carried on his translations while residing in Salerno. Matteo Ricci started to report on the thoughts of Confucius, and a team of Jesuits—Prospero Intorcetta, Philippe Couplet, and two others—published a translation of several Confucian works and an overview of Chinese history in Paris in 1687. François Noël, after failing to persuade Clement XI that Chinese veneration of ancestors and Confucius did not constitute idolatry, completed the Confucian canon at Prague in 1711, with more scholarly treatments of the other works and the first translation of the collected works of Mencius. It is thought that such works had considerable importance on European thinkers of the period, particularly among the Deists and other philosophical groups of the Enlightenment who were interested by the integration of the system of morality of Confucius into Western civilization.

In the modern era Confucian movements, such as New Confucianism, still exist, but during the Cultural Revolution, Confucianism was frequently attacked by leading figures in the Chinese Communist Party. This was partially a continuation of the condemnations of Confucianism by intellectuals and activists in the early 20th century as a cause of the ethnocentric close-mindedness and refusal of the Qing dynasty to modernize that led to the tragedies that befell China in the 19th century.

Confucian teachings, values, and practices permeated and influenced East Asian countries—particularly Korea, Japan, and Vietnam—in areas such as education systems, civil service selection, and ethical and social relations.

Among Tibetans, Confucius is often worshipped as a holy king and master of magic, divination and astrology. Tibetan Buddhists see him as learning divination from the Buddha Manjushri (and that knowledge subsequently reaching Tibet through Princess Wencheng), while Bon practitioners see him as being a reincarnation of Tonpa Shenrab Miwoche, the legendary founder of Bon.

The Ahmadiyya believes Confucius was a Divine Prophet of God, as were Lao-Tzu and other eminent Chinese personages.

According to the Siddhar tradition of Tamil Nadu, Confucius is one of the 18 esteemed Siddhars of yore, and is better known as Kalangi Nathar or Kamalamuni. The Thyagaraja Temple in Thiruvarur, Tamil Nadu is home to his Jeeva Samadhi.

In modern times, Asteroid 7853, "Confucius", was named after the Chinese thinker.

=== Teaching and disciples ===
Confucius was regarded as the first teacher who advocated for public welfare and the spread of education in China. Confucius devoted his entire life, from a relatively young age, to teaching. He pioneered private education adopting a curriculum known as the Six Arts, aimed at making education accessible to all social classes, and believed in its power to cultivate character rather than merely vocational skills. Confucius not only made teaching his profession but also contributed to the development of a distinct class of professionals in ancient China—the gentlemen who were neither farmers, artisans, merchants, nor officials but instead dedicated themselves to teaching and potential government service.

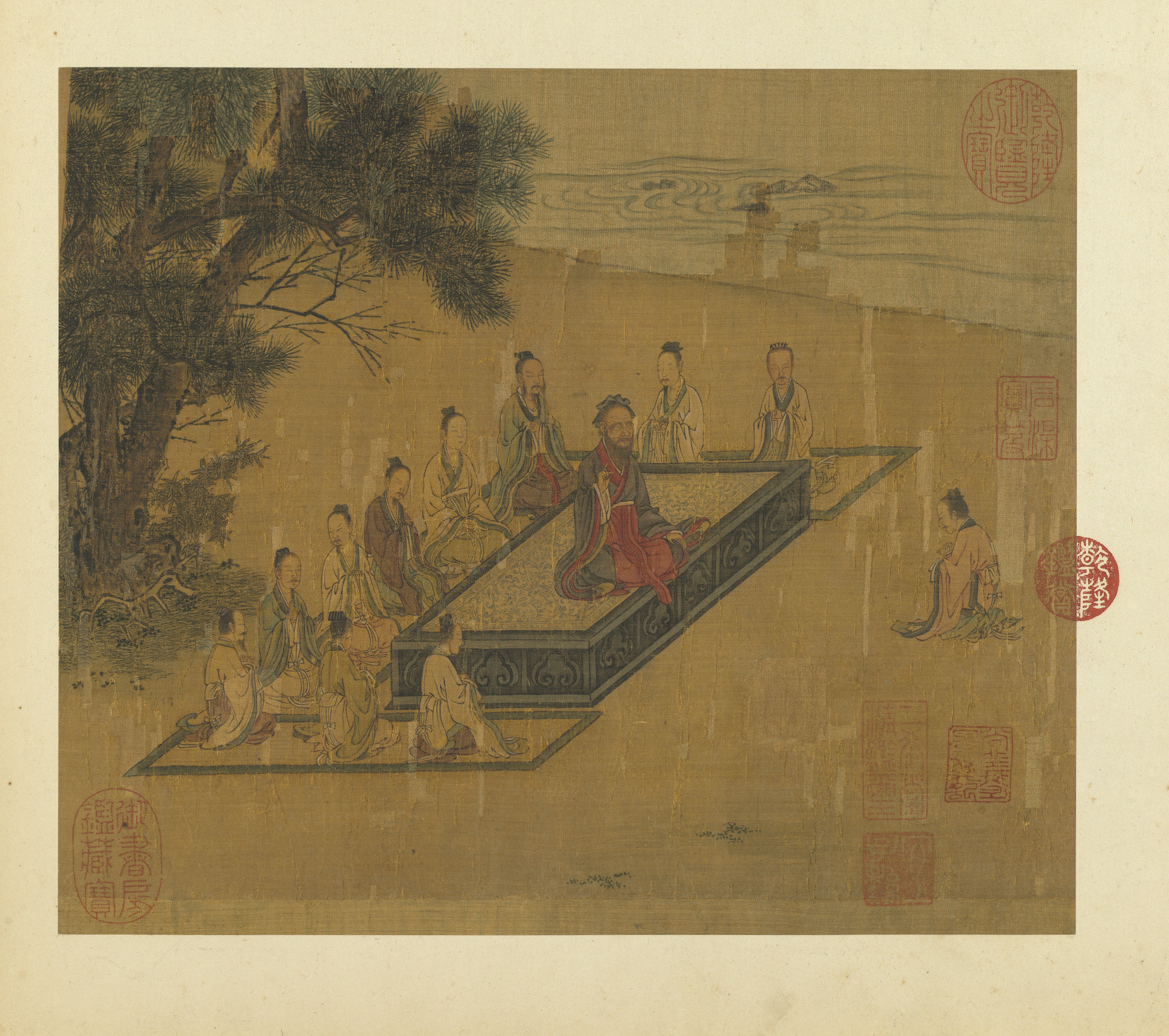
Zengzi (right) kneeling before Confucius (center), as depicted in a painting from the Illustrations of the Classic of Filial Piety, Song dynasty

Confucius began teaching after he turned 30, and taught more than 3,000 students in his life, about 70 of whom were considered outstanding. His disciples and the early Confucian community they formed became the most influential intellectual force in the Warring States period. The Han dynasty historian Sima Qian dedicated a chapter in his Records of the Grand Historian to the biographies of Confucius's disciples, accounting for the influence they exerted in their time and afterward. Sima Qian recorded the names of 77 disciples in his collective biography, while Kongzi Jiayu, another early source, records 76, not completely overlapping. The two sources together yield the names of 96 disciples. Twenty-two of them are mentioned in the Analects, while the Mencius records 24.

Confucius did not charge any tuition, and only requested a symbolic gift of a bundle of dried meat from any prospective student. According to his disciple Zigong, his master treated students like doctors treated patients and did not turn anybody away. Most of them came from Lu, Confucius's home state, with 43 recorded, but he accepted students from all over China, with six from the state of Wey (such as Zigong), three from Qin, two each from Chen and Qi, and one each from Cai, Chu, and Song. Confucius considered his students' personal background irrelevant, and accepted noblemen, commoners, and even former criminals such as Yan Zhuoju and Gongye Chang. His disciples from richer families would pay a sum commensurate with their wealth which was considered a ritual donation.

Confucius's favorite disciple was Yan Hui, most probably one of the most impoverished of them all. Sima Niu, in contrast to Yan Hui, was from a hereditary noble family hailing from the Song state. Under Confucius's teachings, the disciples became well learned in the principles and methods of government. He often engaged in discussion and debate with his students and gave high importance to their studies in history, poetry, and ritual. Confucius advocated loyalty to principle rather than to individual acumen, in which reform was to be achieved by persuasion rather than violence. Even though Confucius denounced them for their practices, the aristocracy was likely attracted to the idea of having trustworthy officials who were studied in morals as the circumstances of the time made it desirable. In fact, the disciple Zilu even died defending his ruler in Wey.

Yang Hu, who was a subordinate of the Ji family, had dominated the Lu government from 505 to 502 and even attempted a coup, which narrowly failed. As a likely consequence, it was after this that the first disciples of Confucius were appointed to government positions. A few of Confucius's disciples went on to attain official positions of some importance, some of which were arranged by Confucius. By the time Confucius was 50 years old, the Ji family had consolidated their power in the Lu state over the ruling ducal house. Even though the Ji family had practices with which Confucius disagreed and disapproved, they nonetheless gave Confucius's disciples many opportunities for employment. Confucius continued to remind his disciples to stay true to their principles and renounced those who did not, all the while being openly critical of the Ji family.

=== In the West ===
The influence of Confucius has been observed on multiple Western thinkers, including Niels Bohr, Benjamin Franklin, Allen Ginsberg, Thomas Jefferson, Gottfried Wilhelm Leibniz, Robert Cummings Neville, Alexander Pope, Ezra Pound, François Quesnay, Friedrich Schiller, Voltaire, and Christian Wolff.

=== Visual portraits ===
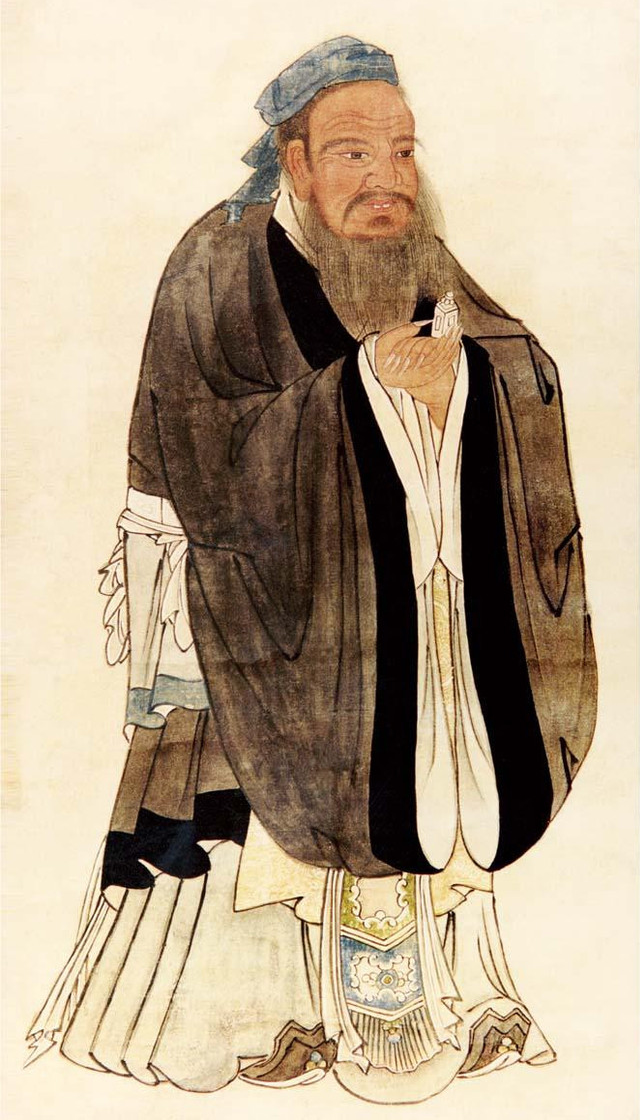
Portrait by Qiu Ying (1494–1552), Ming dynasty

No contemporary painting or sculpture of Confucius survives, and it was only during the Han dynasty that he was portrayed visually. Carvings often depict his legendary meeting with Laozi. Since that time there have been many portraits of Confucius as the ideal philosopher. An early verbal portrayal of Confucius is found in the chapter "External Things" (外物; Wàiwù) of the book Zhuangzi (莊子; Zhuāngzǐ), finished in about 3rd BCE, long after Confucius's death. The oldest known portrait of Confucius has been unearthed in the tomb of the Han dynasty ruler Marquis of Haihun (died 59 BCE). The picture was painted on the wooden frame to a polished bronze mirror.

In former times, it was customary to have a portrait in Confucius Temples; however, during the reign of Hongwu Emperor (Taizu) of the Ming dynasty, it was decided that the only proper portrait of Confucius should be in the temple in his home town, Qufu in Shandong. In other temples, Confucius is represented by a memorial tablet. In 2006, the China Confucius Foundation commissioned a standard portrait of Confucius based on the Tang dynasty portrait by Wu Daozi.

The South Wall Frieze in the courtroom of the Supreme Court of the United States depicts Confucius as a teacher of harmony, learning, and virtue.

=== Fictional portrayals ===
There have been two film adaptations of Confucius' life: the 1940 film Confucius starring Tang Huaiqiu, and the 2010 film Confucius starring Chow Yun-fat.

Confucius appears as a leader in Civilization VII, leading China.

=== Memorials ===
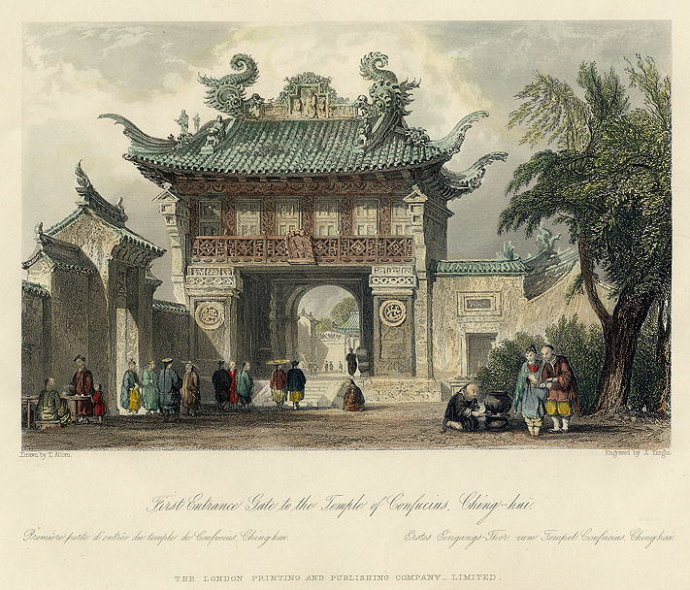
First entrance gate of the Temple of Confucius in Zhenhai

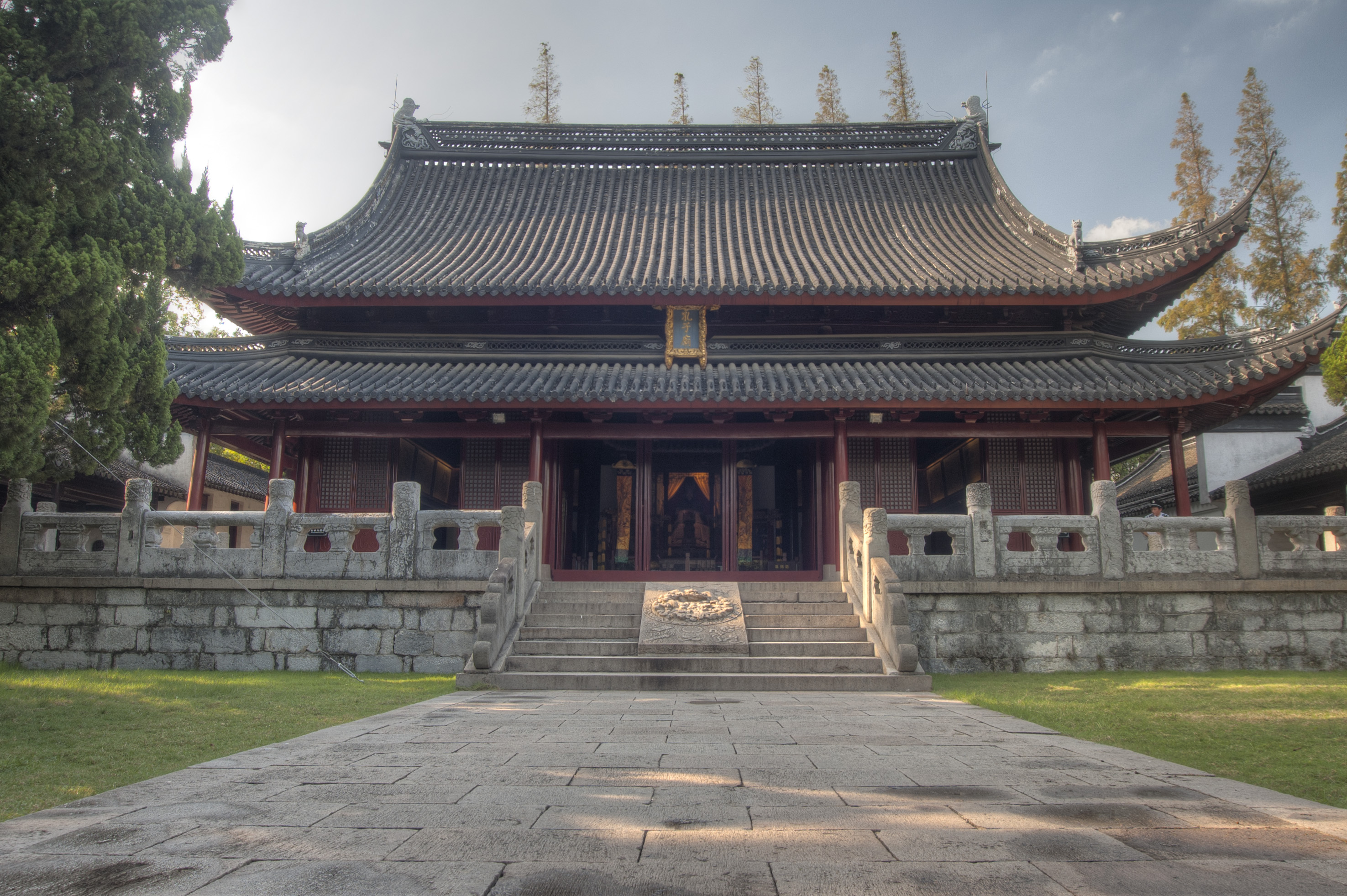
The Temple of Confucius in Jiading, now a suburb of Shanghai. The Jiading Temple of Confucius now operates a museum devoted to the imperial exam formerly administered at the temples.

Throughout the imperial periods, Qufu, Confucius' birthplace and burial site, remained a place of devotion and reverence. The Records of the Grand Historian records the first state sacrifice by Emperor Gaozu of Han at Confucius' tomb, followed by worship of ministers, dukes, and scholar politicians. From the Tang dynasty onward, temples honoring Confucius and Confucian sages were erected across the country by imperial decree. These temples have been used for ceremonies paying tribute to Confucius as the master of teachers, as well as the Confucian virtues that have shaped the Chinese civilization.

When the Communist regime take control of mainland China in 1949, this tradition was interrupted for at least three decades during the Maoist Era in the campaign purging the Four Olds, and the subsequent campaign denouncing Lin Biao and Confucius. The official stance of the Chinese Communist Party during the Cultural Revolution was that Confucius and Confucianism represented reactionary ideologies of the slave-owning aristocracy. All Confucian ceremonies and rites were therefore banned, and Confucius tomb attacked by the Red Guards. In the early 1980s, the anti-Confucius sentiments were over, and Confucius veneration was resumed with Communist officials in attendance. By the 21st century, Confucius' birthday in Qufu becomes a week long celebration attended by diplomats, scholars, and government representatives.

In Taiwan, where the Nationalist Party (Kuomintang) strongly promoted Confucian beliefs in ethics and behavior, the tradition of the memorial ceremony of Confucius is supported by the government and has continued without interruption. In May 2025, Confucius' birthday - September 28 - previously designated as "Teacher' Day", was made a public holiday by legislation.

In South Korea, a grand-scale memorial ceremony called Seokjeon Daeje is held twice a year on Confucius's birthday and the anniversary of his death, at Confucian academies across the country and Sungkyunkwan in Seoul.

=== Descendants ===
Confucius's descendants were repeatedly identified and honored by successive imperial governments with titles of nobility and official posts. They were honored with the rank of a marquis 35 times since Gaozu of the Han dynasty, and they were promoted to the rank of duke 42 times from the Tang dynasty to the Qing dynasty. Emperor Xuanzong of Tang first bestowed the title of "Duke Wenxuan" on Kong Suizhi of the 35th generation. In 1055, Emperor Renzong of Song first bestowed the title of "Duke Yansheng" on Kong Zongyuan of the 46th generation.

During the Southern Song dynasty, the Duke Yansheng Kong Duanyou fled south with the Song Emperor to Quzhou in Zhejiang, while the newly established Jin dynasty (1115–1234) in the north appointed Kong Duanyou's brother Kong Duancao who remained in Qufu as Duke Yansheng. From that time up until the Yuan dynasty, there were two Duke Yanshengs, one in the north in Qufu and the other in the south at Quzhou. An invitation to come back to Qufu was extended to the southern Duke Yansheng Kong Zhu by the Yuan-dynasty Emperor Kublai Khan. The title was taken away from the southern branch after Kong Zhu rejected the invitation, so the northern branch of the family kept the title of Duke Yansheng. The southern branch remained in Quzhou where they live to this day. Confucius's descendants in Quzhou alone number 30,000. The Hanlin Academy rank of Wujing boshi 五經博士 was awarded to the southern branch at Quzhou by a Ming Emperor while the northern branch at Qufu held the title Duke Yansheng. The leader of the southern branch was 孔祥楷 Kong Xiangkai.

In 1351, during the reign of Emperor Toghon Temür of the Yuan dynasty, 54th-generation Kong Shao (孔昭) moved from China to Korea during the Goryeo dynasty, and was received courteously by Princess Noguk (the Mongolian-born queen consort of the future king Gongmin). After being naturalized as a subject of Goryeo, he changed the hanja of his name from "昭" to "紹" (both pronounced so in Korean), married a Korean woman and bore a son (Gong Yeo (Korean: 공여; Hanja: 孔帤), 1329–1397), therefore establishing the Changwon Gong clan (Korean: 창원 공씨; Hanja: 昌原 孔氏), whose ancestral seat was located in Changwon, South Gyeongsang Province. In 1794, during the reign of King Jeongjo, the clan then changed its name to Gokbu Gong clan (Korean: 곡부 공씨; Hanja: 曲阜 孔氏) in honor of Confucius's birthplace Qufu (Korean: 곡부; Hanja: 曲阜; RR: Gokbu).

Famous descendants include actors such as Gong Yoo (real name Gong Ji-cheol (공지철)) and Gong Hyo-jin (공효진); and artists such as male idol group B1A4 member Gongchan (real name Gong Chan-sik (공찬식)), singer-songwriter Minzy (real name Gong Min-ji (공민지)), as well as her great-aunt, traditional folk dancer Gong Ok-jin (공옥진).

Despite repeated dynastic change in China, the title of Duke Yansheng was bestowed upon successive generations of descendants until it was abolished by the Nationalist government in 1935. The last holder of the title, Kung Te-cheng of the 77th generation, was appointed Sacrificial Official to Confucius. Kung Te-cheng died in October 2008, and his son, Kung Wei-yi, the 78th lineal descendant, died in 1989. Kung Te-cheng's grandson, Kung Tsui-chang, the 79th lineal descendant, was born in 1975; his great-grandson, Kung Yu-jen, the 80th lineal descendant, was born in Taipei on 1 January 2006. Te-cheng's sister, Kong Demao, lives in mainland China and has written a book about her experiences growing up at the family estate in Qufu. Another sister, Kong Deqi, died as a young woman. Many descendants of Confucius still live in Qufu today.

A descendant of Confucius, H. H. Kung, was the Premier of the Republic of China. One of his sons, Kong Lingjie (孔令傑), married Debra Paget who gave birth to Gregory Kung (孔德基).

Confucius's family, the Kongs, have the longest recorded extant pedigree in the world today. The father-to-son family tree, now in its 83rd generation, has been recorded since the death of Confucius. According to the Confucius Genealogy Compilation Committee (CGCC), he has two million known and registered descendants, and there are an estimated three million in all. Of these, several tens of thousands live outside of China. In the 14th century, a Kong descendant went to Korea, where an estimated 34,000 descendants of Confucius live today. One of the main lineages fled from the Kong ancestral home in Qufu during the Chinese Civil War in the 1940s and eventually settled in Taiwan. There are also branches of the Kong family who have converted to Islam after marrying Muslim women, in Dachuan in Gansu province in the 1800s, and in 1715 in Xuanwei in Yunnan province. Many of the Muslim Confucius descendants are descended from the marriage of Ma Jiaga (馬甲尕), a Muslim woman, and Kong Yanrong (孔彥嶸), 59th generation descendant of Confucius in the year 1480, and are found among the Hui and Dongxiang peoples. The new genealogy includes the Muslims. Kong Dejun (孔德軍) is a prominent Islamic scholar and Arabist from Qinghai province and a 77th generation descendant of Confucius.

Because of the huge interest in the Confucius family tree, there was a project in China to test the DNA of known family members of the collateral branches in mainland China. Among other things, this would allow scientists to identify a common Y chromosome in male descendants of Confucius. If the descent were truly unbroken, father-to-son, since Confucius's lifetime, the males in the family would all have the same Y chromosome as their direct male ancestor, with slight mutations due to the passage of time. The aim of the genetic test was to help members of collateral branches in China who lost their genealogical records to prove their descent. However, in 2009, many of the collateral branches decided not to agree to DNA testing. Bryan Sykes, professor of genetics at Oxford University, understands this decision: "The Confucius family tree has an enormous cultural significance ... It's not just a scientific question." The DNA testing was originally proposed to add new members, many of whose family record books were lost during 20th century upheavals, to the Confucian family tree. The main branch of the family which fled to Taiwan was never involved in the proposed DNA test at all.

In 2013, a DNA test performed on multiple different families who claimed descent from Confucius found that they shared the same Y chromosome as reported by Fudan University.

The fifth and most recent edition of the Confucius genealogy was printed by the CGCC. It was unveiled in a ceremony at Qufu on 24 September 2009. Women are now included for the first time.

== Criticism ==
=== During the Cultural Revolution ===
During the Cultural Revolution, criticism of Confucius increased, coming to a head when Red Guard soldiers removed the body of Kong Jingyi, a 76th generation Duke Yansheng, from his grave at the Cemetery of Confucius. His body was then hung naked from a tree.

Anti-Confucian sentiment continued to increase in 1973, when Mao Zedong started a Criticize Lin, Criticize Confucius (simplified Chinese: 批林批孔运动; traditional Chinese: 批林批孔運動; pinyin: pī lín pī kǒng yùndòng) campaign, branding Confucius with the name "Kong Lao'er" 孔老二, a pun on a Mandarin word for penis. It persisted until 1976 as the Cultural Revolution subsided.

During this time, Confucius was perceived as a reflection of Xia and Zhou dynasty slavedriving practice. Specifically, by promoting the upkeep of the Rites of Zhou, which itself involved the keeping of slave, he was seen as complicit in its persistence across the ages. This position was justified through entries in Records of the Grand Historian. With this context, the Spring and Autumn Annals attributed to Confucius were seen as his attempt to defend the State of Lu as a slave state. Furthermore, the execution of Shao Zhengmao was seen as a reflection of bourgeois power games, the charges against the minister being seen as trumped-up. It was from this that Confucian principles such as ren 仁 and Zhong 忠 were abstracted as symbols of elitism.
