= Gongxi Ai =

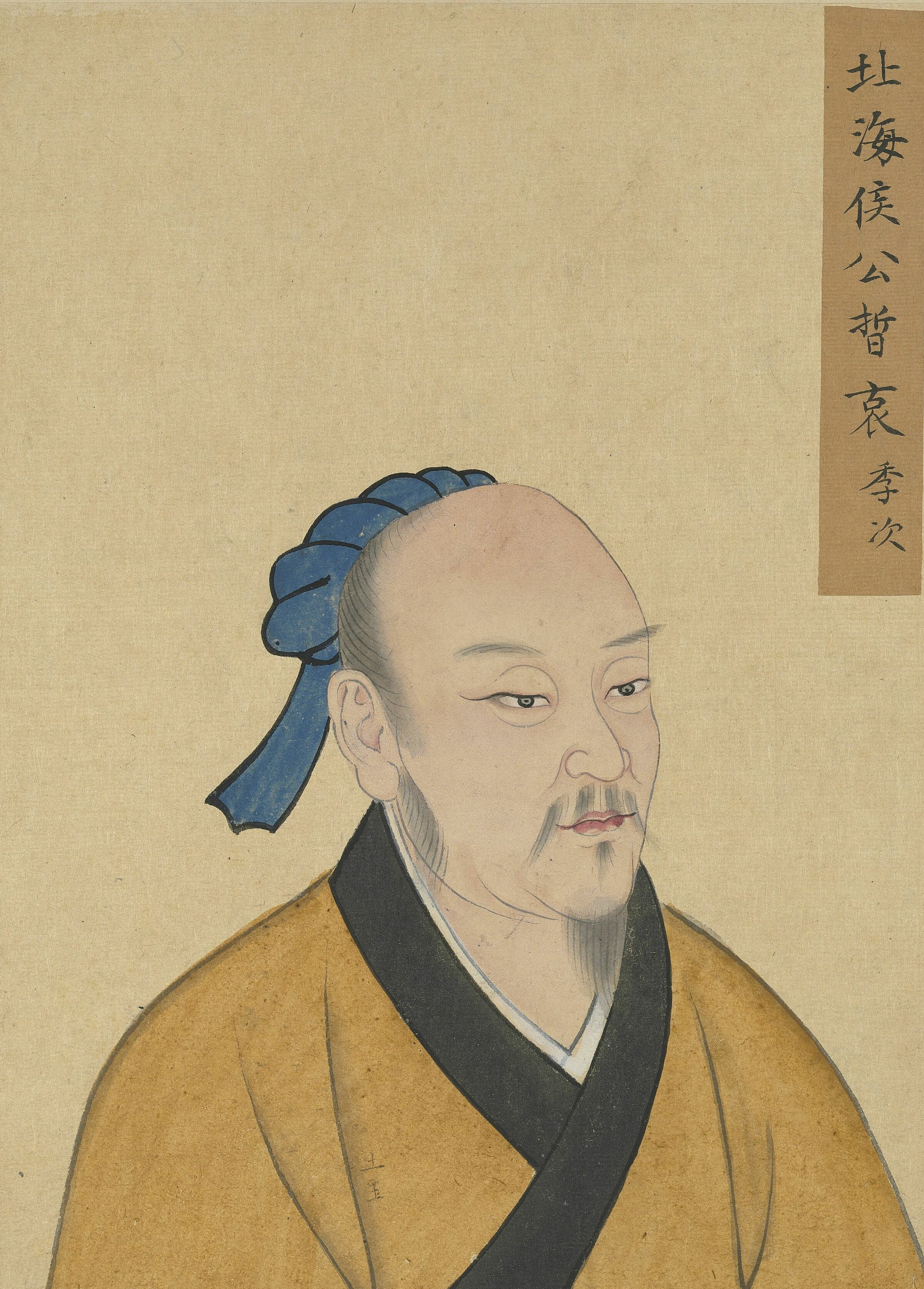

Gongxi Ai (Chinese: 公皙哀; Wade–Giles: Kung-hsi Ai), courtesy name Jici (Chinese: 季次; Wade–Giles: Chi-tz'u), was a disciple of Confucius. Sima Zhen's Shiji Suoyin says his name was Gongxi Ke (Chinese: 公皙克), citing the Kongzi Jiayu.

Gongxi Ai's years of birth and death are unknown. He is not mentioned in the Analects, but the Kongzi Jiayu says he was born in the State of Qi. He was said to have refused to accept employment with the noble families that had encroached on the power of the nominal rulers of the states, and opted to live in abject poverty. Confucius praised him for adhering to his principles.

== Honours ==
In Confucian temples, Gongxi Ai's spirit tablet is placed in the outer court, beyond those of the Four Assessors and Twelve Wise Ones, and after that of Gongye Chang.

During the Tang dynasty, Emperor Xuanzong posthumously awarded Gongxi Ai the nobility title of Count of Ni (郳伯). During the Song dynasty, he was further awarded the title of Marquis of Beihai (北海侯).

== Bibliography ==
- Han, Zhaoqi (2010). "Biographies of the Disciples of Confucius". Shiji 史记 (in Chinese). Beijing: Zhonghua Book Company. ISBN 978-7-101-07272-3.
- Legge, James (2009). The Confucian Analects, the Great Learning & the Doctrine of the Mean. Cosimo. ISBN 978-1-60520-644-8.
