= Junzi =

Ancient Chinese philosophical term for an ideal person

Chinese name
- Chinese: 君子
- Literal meaning: "Son of a Vassal". Later used to indicate someone who acts morally.
Transcriptions
Standard Mandarin
- Hanyu Pinyin: jūnzǐ
- Gwoyeu Romatzyh: jiuntzyy
- Wade–Giles: chün1tzu3
- IPA: [tɕýn.tsɹ̩̀]
Yue: Cantonese
- Jyutping: gwan1zi2

Vietnamese name
- Vietnamese alphabet: quân tử
- Chữ Hán: 君子

Korean name
- Hangul: 군자
- Hanja: 君子
Transcriptions
- Revised Romanization: gunja

Japanese name
- Kanji: 君子
- Kana: くんし
Transcriptions
- Romanization: kunshi

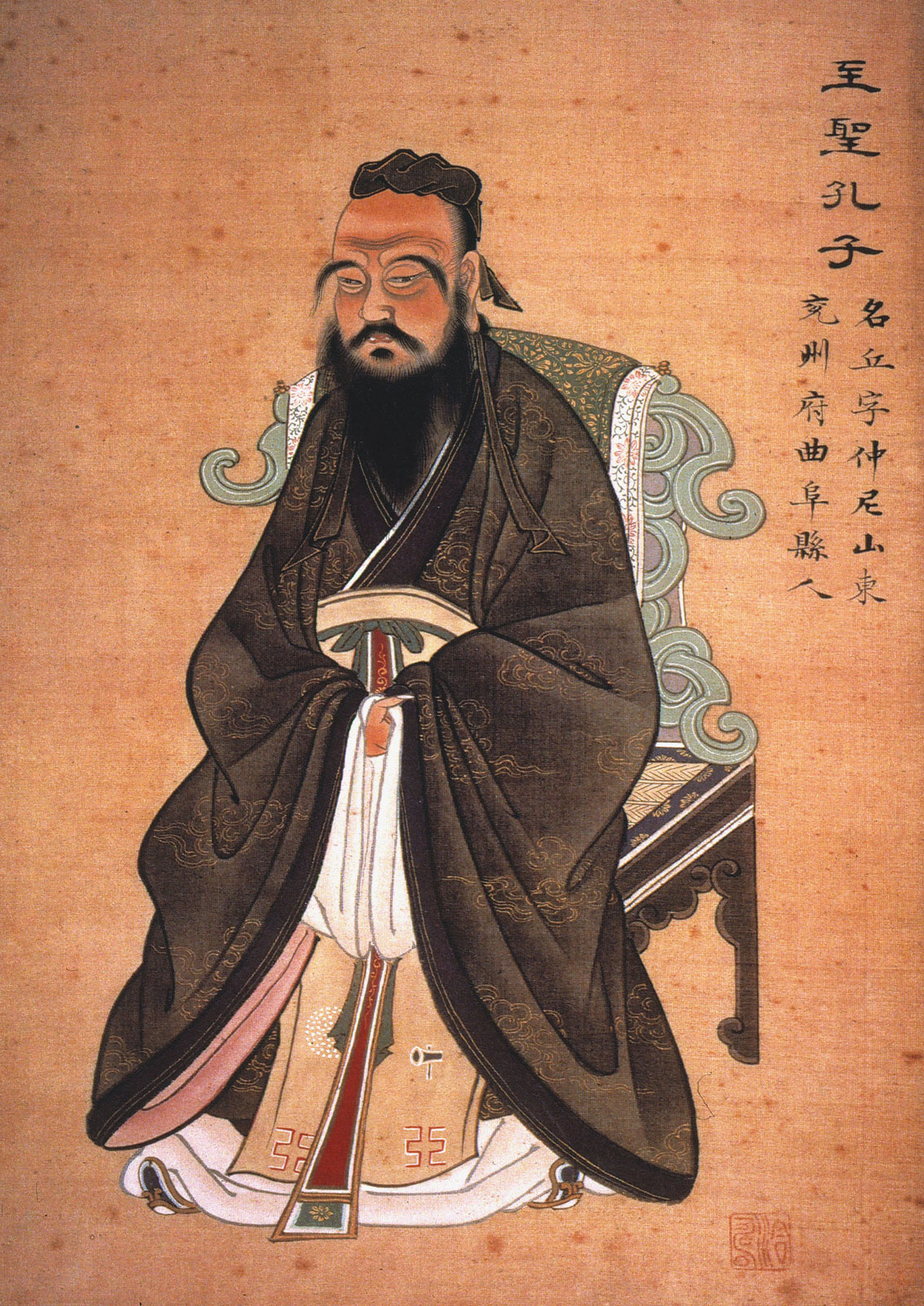
Confucius, whose philosophy created the ideal of a Junzi

The word junzi (Chinese: 君子; pinyin: jūn zǐ; lit. 'person of high stature' or "Son of the Vassal, or Monarch") is a Chinese philosophical term often translated as "gentleman", "superior person", or "noble man". Since the characters are overtly gendered, the term is frequently translated as "gentleman"; gentry and distinguished/moral person are common gender-neutral translations. Traditionally referring to the "aristocratic nobility of the Zhou", Junzi is employed in the Book of Changes to mean a superior, ideal person who constantly cultivates virtue and improves their character, and by Confucius in his works to describe a virtuous person with noble characters.

== In Confucianism ==
In Confucianism, the ideal personality is the shèng (聖), translated as saint or sage. However, since sagehood is unattainable for most people, Confucius articulated a less demanding ideal of a cultured and moral life, using the term junzi—originally denoting a member of the nobility—to refer to anyone who embodies this ideal, regardless of social status. Junzi acts according to "proper conduct" (禮; li) to bring about "harmony" (和; hé), which Confucianism maintains should rule the home, society, and the state. Li primarily has to do with social expectations, both in terms of the formal behavior and the execution of religious rites and imperial ceremonies also proper conduct in human relationships. Confucius considered a junzi to be someone who embodies humanity – one who possesses a totality of the highest human qualities. He elaborated that junzi embody the concept of rén (仁) and outlined specific qualities they have, recorded by his disciples in the Analects. A junzi embodies moral superiority by adhering to the ritual code of the tradition, displaying respect and dignity towards others, and striving for virtues such as humility, sincerity, trustworthiness, righteousness, and compassion. Zhu Xi categorized the junzi as second only to the sage.

Junzi have many characteristics. A junzi does not compromise his virtues even in poverty; a junzi's actions speaks louder than his words; a junzi is loyal, obedient and knowledgeable. A junzi disciplines himself. According to Mencius, ren is the core virtue of a junzi.

The concept and term of junzi were used as Chinese proverbs. An example is 君子成人之美; jūn zǐ chéng rén zhī měi, which roughly means "A junzi brings out the best in people".

== Governance ==
As the potential leader of a nation and country, the son of the ruler is raised to express superior ethical and moral positions while gaining inner peace through virtue. To Confucius, the junzi sustained the functions of government and social stratification through his ethical values. Despite its literal meaning, any righteous man willing to improve himself can become a junzi.

The junzi rules by acting virtuously himself. It is thought that his pure virtue would lead others to follow his example. The ultimate goal is that government behaves much like family. Thus at all levels filial piety promotes harmony and the junzi acts as a beacon for this piety.

== Junzi and xiaoren ==
By contrast the xiăorén (小人; "scoundrel, small or petty person") does not grasp the value of virtues and seeks only immediate personal gain. The scoundrel, or petty person, is egotistic and does not consider the consequences of his/her actions. Should the ruler or state be surrounded by xiaoren as opposed to junzi, governance and the people will suffer due to their selfish small-mindness. Examples of such xiaoren individuals can range from those who indulge in self-satisfying sensual and emotional pleasures and gains to the career politician who is interested merely in power and fame rather than the long-term benefit of others. There are many expressions in Confucius' writings that contrast the two, for instance: "The junzi acts in harmony with others but does not seek to be like them; the xiaoren seeks to be like others and does not act in harmony." (君子和而不同，小人同而不和; jūn zǐ hé ér bù tóng, xiǎo rén tóng ér bù hé)

== See also ==
- Confucianism
- Five Classics - five ancient Chinese texts forming the core of the Confucian canon
- Four arts - four scholarly accomplishments of ancient Chinese gentleman
- Four Gentlemen - four plants depicted in art as symbols of Confucian virtues
- Four Sages - four eminent Confucian figures
- Magnanimity § Aristotle - Aristotle’s virtue of “greatness of soul”
- New Man (utopian concept) - utopian concept of creating an ideal “new” human archetype across various religious and political ideologies

== Bibliography ==
- Gardner, Daniel K. (2014). Confucianism: a very short introduction. Oxford: Oxford Univ. Press. ISBN 978-0-19-539891-5.
