= Gongye Chang =

Major disciple and the son-in-law of Confucius

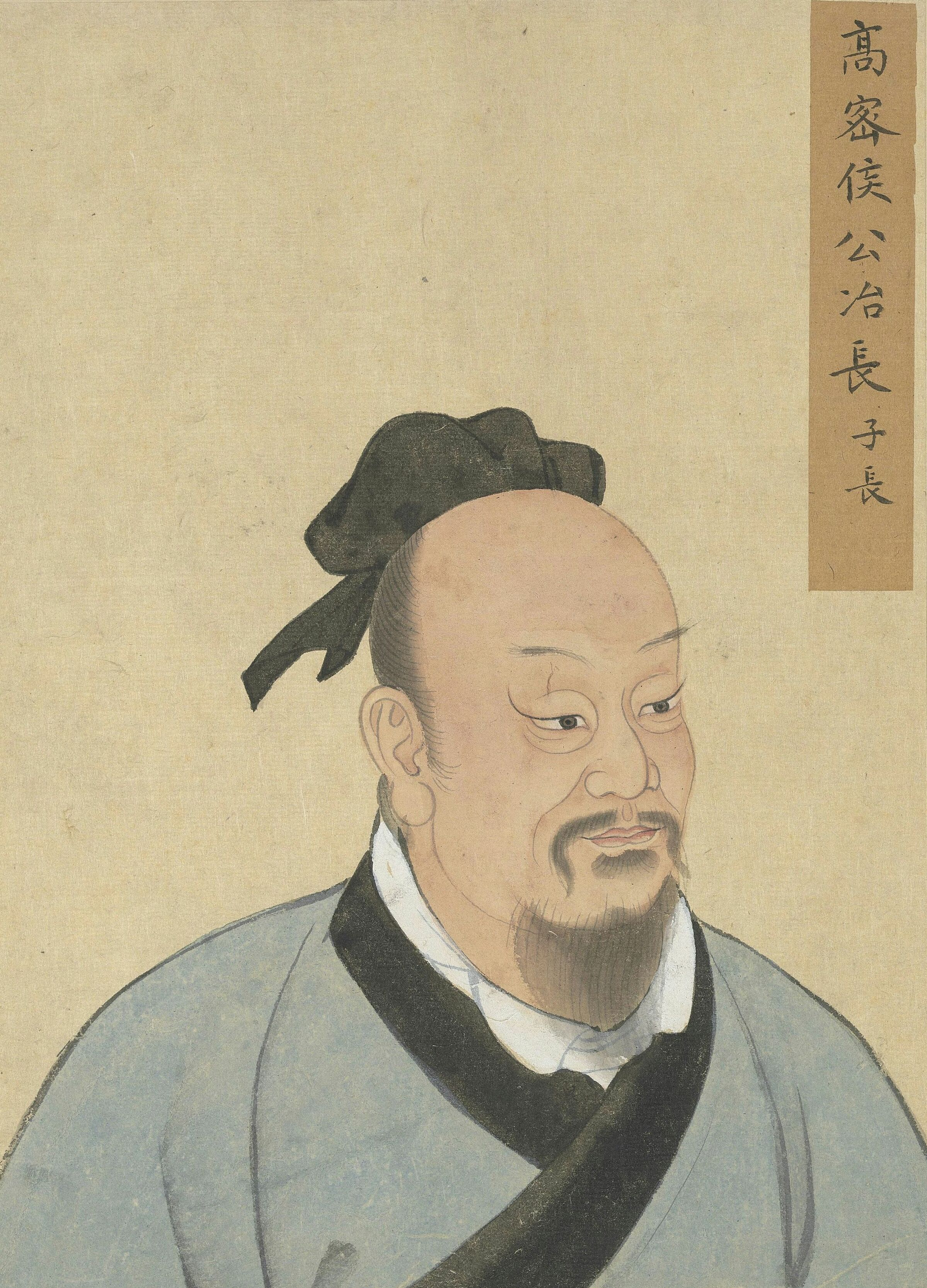
Busts of Sages and Worthies, Album - Gongye Chang

Gongye Chang (Chinese: 公冶長; Wade–Giles: Kung-yeh Ch'ang), courtesy name Zichang (Chinese: 子長; Wade–Giles: Tzu-ch'ang), was a major disciple and the son-in-law of Confucius. Little is known about his life, but Chinese legends attribute to him the ability to understand birds' language.

== Life ==
Gongye Chang's years of birth and death are unknown. The Records of the Grand Historian says he was a native of the State of Qi, but according to Kong Anguo and others, he was from the State of Lu.

According to the Analects, Gongye Chang was once imprisoned for an unidentified crime. However, Confucius believed he was innocent, and married his daughter to him. Although the exact nature of his offence is not known, Confucius' marriage of his daughter to him despite the strong stigma attached to criminals in the Zhou dynasty demonstrates Confucius' adherence to moral reason and his independence from arbitrary social conventions.

== Legend ==
Little is known about Gongye Chang's life, but he became the subject of a variety of later Chinese legends and folklore, and was said to be able to understand the language of animals and birds. In one story, which explains why he was imprisoned, he overheard a number of birds discussing the location of a murder victim. His knowledge of the body led him to be arrested for the person's murder, but he was released after demonstrating his supernatural powers. The story appeared in the book Lunshi (論釋), and became widely known. Tang dynasty poets Shen Quanqi and Bai Juyi both made references to Gongye Chang's story in their poems.

== Honours ==
In Confucian temples, Gongye Chang's spirit tablet is placed in the outer court, beyond those of the Four Assessors and Twelve Wise Ones, and next to that of Fu Buqi.

During the Tang dynasty, Emperor Xuanzong posthumously awarded Gongye Chang the nobility title of Count of Ju (莒伯). During the Song dynasty, he was further awarded the title of Marquis of Gaomi (高密侯).

== Bibliography ==
- Han, Zhaoqi (2010). "Biographies of the Disciples of Confucius". Shiji 史记 (in Chinese). Beijing: Zhonghua Book Company. ISBN 978-7-101-07272-3.
- Huang, Chichung, ed. (1997). The Analects of Confucius. Oxford University Press. ISBN 978-0-19-506157-4.
- Legge, James (2009). The Confucian Analects, the Great Learning & the Doctrine of the Mean. Cosimo. ISBN 978-1-60520-644-8.
- Slingerland, Edward (2003). Analects: With Selections from Traditional Commentaries. Hackett Publishing. ISBN 1-60384-345-0.
