= Li (Confucianism) =

Concept of rite in Chinese philosophy

Chinese name
- Traditional Chinese: 禮
- Simplified Chinese: 礼
Transcriptions
Standard Mandarin
- Hanyu Pinyin: lǐ
- Wade–Giles: li^{3}
- IPA: [lì]
Yue: Cantonese
- Yale Romanization: láih
- Jyutping: lai5
- IPA: [lɐj˩˧]
Southern Min
- Tâi-lô: lè
Middle Chinese
- Middle Chinese: lei^{X}
Old Chinese
- Baxter–Sagart (2014): *[r]ˤijʔ

Vietnamese name
- Vietnamese: lễ
- Chữ Hán: 禮

Korean name
- Hangul: 예
- Hanja: 禮
Transcriptions
- Revised Romanization: Ye

Japanese name
- Kanji: 礼
Transcriptions
- Romanization: rei

In traditional Confucian philosophy, li is an ethical concept broadly translatable as 'rite'. According to Wing-tsit Chan, li originally referred to religious sacrifices, but has come to mean 'ritual' in a broad sense, with possible translations including 'ceremony', 'ritual', 'decorum', 'propriety', and 'good form'. Hu Shih notes that li has "even been equated with natural law" by some western scholars. In Chinese cosmology, li refers to rites through which human agency participates in the larger order of the universe. One of the most common definitions of 'rite' is a performance transforming the invisible into the visible: through the performance of rites at appropriate occasions, humans make the underlying order visible. Correct ritual practice focuses and orders the social world in correspondence with the terrestrial and celestial worlds, keeping all three in harmony.

Throughout the Sinosphere, li was thought of as the abstract force that made government possible—along with the Mandate of Heaven it metaphysically combined with—and it ensured "worldly authority" would bestow itself onto competent rulers. The effect of ritual has been described as "centering", and was among the duties of the emperor, who was called the 'Son of Heaven'. However, rites were performed by all those involved in the affairs of state. Rites also involve ancestral and life-cycle dimensions. Daoists who conducted the rites of local gods as a centering of the forces of exemplary history, of liturgical service, of the correct conduct of human relations, and of the arts of divination such as the earliest of all Chinese classics—the I Ching—joining textual learning to bodily practices for harmonization of exogenous and endogenous origins of energy qi for a longer healthier life.

== Etymology ==
The graphic root of the character for li represents a type of ritual vessel (called a li), to which is added the graph for "altar stand", an element commonly marking graphs for religious objects or activities.

== Scope ==
The rites of li are not rites in the Western conception of religious custom. Rather, li embodies "all those 'objective' prescriptions of behavior... that bind human beings and the spirits together in networks of interacting roles within the family, within human society, and with the numinous realm beyond". It envelops the entire spectrum of interaction with humans, nature, and even material objects. Confucius includes in his discussions of li such diverse topics as learning, the district drinking ceremony, titles, mourning, and governance.

In various cases Xunzi cites "songs and laughter, weeping and lamentation... rice and millet, fish and meat... the wearing of ceremonial caps, embroidered robes, and patterned silks, or of fasting clothes and mourning clothes... unspacious rooms and very nonsecluded halls, hard mats, seats, and flooring" as vital parts of the fabric of li.

== Approaches ==
Among the earliest historical discussions on li occurred in the 25th year of Duke Zhao of Lu (traditional Chinese: 魯昭公; simplified Chinese: 鲁昭公; pinyin: lǔ zhāo gōng) (517 BCE) in the Zuo Zhuan.

Li consists of the norms of proper social behavior as taught to others by fathers, village elders, and government officials. The teachings of li promoted ideals such as filial piety, fraternity, righteousness, good faith, and loyalty. The influence of li guided the popular ethos in areas such as loyalty to superiors and respect for elders in the community.

Confucius taught that the conscientious practice of li—ritual propriety—"humanizes" or "civilizes" individuals by distinguishing them from animals, and that observing these rituals in all aspects of life enables people to fulfill their proper roles (parent, child, ruler, subject, etc.), thereby sustaining the five fundamental relationships that underpin social harmony and order.

The rituals and practices of li are dynamic in nature. Li practices have been revised and evaluated throughout time to reflect emerging views and beliefs. Dynamic li practices allow a society to adapt to new challenges without sacrificing the cohesion that rituals provide. Thus, li remains a living medium through which Confucian objectives are realized: it continually aligns human behavior with moral ideals in changing contexts, yet does so in a conservative way that sustains, rather than undermines, social stability.

== In governance ==
Confucius envisioned proper government being guided by the principles of li. Some Confucians proposed the perfectibility of human beings, with learning Li as an important part of that process. Confucians believed governments should place more emphasis on li and rely much less on penal punishment when they govern.

According to the Spring and Autumn Annals, one of the Confucian classics, the importance of the rites is emphasized as fundamental to proper governmental leadership. Feudal lords in China who adopted the Chinese rites were considered just rulers of the Huaxia China. Contrarily, feudal lords that did not adopt these rites were considered uncivilized, not worthy of being considered part of the Huaxia China.

Confucius believed that li should be practiced by all members of the society. Li also involves the superior treating the inferior with propriety and respect. As Confucius said, "a prince should employ his minister according to the rules of propriety (li); ministers should serve their prince with loyalty" (Analects, 3:19).

Li was "one term by which the [traditional Chinese] historiographers could name all the principles of conservatism they advanced in the speeches of their characters."

== See also ==
- Li (neo-Confucianism)
- Zhou ritual system
- Ritual and music system
- Confucian ritual religion
