= Family tree of Confucius in the main line of descent =

This is a family tree of the main line of descent of Confucius (Chinese: 孔子世家大宗).

== Family tree ==
generation number	叔梁紇; Shuliang He
1	孟皮; Meng Pi	孔丘; Confucius; 551BC–479BC
2	孔鯉; Kong Li; 532BC－483BC
3	孔伋; Kong Ji; 483BC－402BC
4	孔白; Kong Bai
5	孔求; Kong Qiu
6	孔箕; Kong Ji
7	孔穿; Kong Chuan
8	孔謙; Kong Qian
9	孔鮒; Kong Fu	孔騰; Kong Teng	孔樹; Kong Shu
10	孔隨; Kong Sui	孔忠; Kong Zhong
11	□	孔武; Kong Wu
12	□	孔延年; Kong Yannian
13	□	孔霸; Kong Ba
14	孔吉; Kong Ji	孔福; Kong Fu
15	孔何齊; Kong Heqi	孔房; Kong Fang
16	孔弘; Kong Hong	孔均; Kong Jun
17	孔安; Kong An	孔志; Kong Zhi
18	孔損; Kong Sun
19	孔曜; Kong Yao
20	孔完; Kong Wan	孔贊; Kong Zan
21	孔羡; Kong Xian
22	孔震; Kong Zhen
23	孔嶷; Kong Ni
24	孔撫; Kong Fu
25	孔懿; Kong Yi
26	孔鮮; Kong Xian
27	孔乘; Kong Cheng
28	孔靈珍; Kong Lingzhen
29	孔文泰; Kong Wentai
30	孔渠; Kong Qu
31	孔長孫; Kong; Zhangsun
32	孔英悊; Kong Yingzhe	孔嗣悊; Kong Sizhe
33	孔德倫; Kong Delun
34	孔崇基; Kong Chongji
35	孔璲之; Kong Suizhi
36	孔萱; Kong Xuan
37	孔齊卿; Kong Qiqing
38	孔惟晊; Kong Weizhi
39	孔策; Kong Ce
40	孔振; Kong Zhen
41	孔昭檢; Kong Zhaojian
42	孔光嗣; Kong Guangsi
43	孔仁玉; Kong Renyu; 912－956
44	孔宜; Kong Yi; 941－986
45	孔延世; Kong Yanshi; 969－1006	孔延澤; Kong Yanze
46	孔聖佑; Kong Shengyou; 998－1032	孔宗願; Kong Zongyuan
47	孔若蒙; Kong Ruomeng	孔若虛; Kong Ruoxu ?－1104	孔若愚; Kong Ruoyu
48	孔端友; Kong Duanyou; 1078－1132	孔端操; Kong Duancao ?－1133	孔端立; Kong Duanli
49	孔玠; Kong Jie; 1122－1154	孔瑄; Kong Xuan	孔璠; Kong Fan; 1106－1143	孔瑱; Kong Tian	孔琥; Kong Hu
50	孔搢; Kong Jin; 1145－1193	孔拯; Kong Zheng; 1136－1161	孔摠; Kong Zong; 1138－1190	孔拂; Kong Fu
51	孔文遠; Kong Wenyuan; 1185－1226	孔元措; Kong Yuancuo; 1182－1251	孔元綋; Kong Yuanhong	孔元孝; Kong Yuanxiao	孔元用; Kong Yuanyong ?－1227
52	孔萬春; Kong Wanchun ?－1241	Dashed lines denote adoption	孔之固; Kong Zhigu	孔之厚; Kong Zhihou	孔之全; Kong Zhiquan
53	孔洙; Kong Zhu; 1228－1287	孔湞; Kong Zhen	孔浣; Kong Huan ?－1283	孔治; Kong Zhi; 1237－1307
54	孔思晦; Kong Sihui; 1267－1333	孔思誠; Kong Sicheng
55	孔克堅; Kong Kejian; 1316－1370
56	孔希學; Kong Xixue; 1335－1381
57	孔訥; Kong Ne; 1356－1400
58	孔公鑑; Kong Gongjian; 1380－1402
59	孔彦縉; Kong Yanjin; 1401－1455
60	孔承慶; Kong Chengqing; 1420－1450
61	孔弘緒; Kong Hongxu; 1448－1504	孔弘泰; Kong Hongtai; 1450－1503
62	孔聞韶; Kong Wenshao; 1482－1546
63	孔貞幹; Kong Zhengan; 1519－1556	孔貞寧; Kong Zhenning; 1522－1606
64	孔尚賢; Kong Shangxian; 1544－1622	孔尚坦; Kong Shangtan; 1573－1598
65	孔胤椿; Kong Yinchun; 1571－1619	孔胤桂; Kong Yingui ?－1595	孔胤植; Kong Yinzhi; 1592－1648
66	孔興燮; Kong Xingxie; 1636－1668
67	孔毓圻; Kong Yuqi; 1657－1723
68	孔傳鐸; Kong Chuanduo; 1673－1735
69	孔繼濩; Kong Jihuo; 1697－1719
70	孔廣棨; Kong Guangqi; 1713－1743
71	孔昭煥; Kong Zhaohuan; 1735－1782
72	孔憲培; Kong Xianpei; 1756－1793	孔憲增; Kong Xianzeng; 1759－1812
73	孔慶鎔; Kong Qingrong; 1787－1841
74	孔繁灝; Kong Fanhao; 1804－1860
75	孔祥珂; Kong Xiangke; 1848－1876
76	孔令貽; Kong Lingyi; 1872－1919
77	孔德成; Kung Te-cheng; 1920–2008
78	孔維益; Kong Wei-yi; 1939–1989
79	孔垂長; Kung Tsui-chang; 1975–
80	孔佑仁; Kong Yu-jen; 2006–

== List of prominent descendants of Confucius not in the main line ==
The title of Duke of Song and "Duke Who Continues and Honours the Yin" (殷紹嘉公) were bestowed upon Kong An (孔安 (東漢)) by the Eastern Han dynasty because he was part of the Shang dynasty's legacy. This branch of the Confucius family is a separate branch from the line that held the title of Marquis of Fengsheng village and later Duke Yansheng.

- Kong Anguo 11th generation descendant, son of Kong Zhong (孔忠)
- Kong Jie (孔捷), Kong Xi (孔喜), Kong Guang (孔光), sons of Kong Ba (孔霸), younger brothers of Kong Fu (孔福). 14th generation descendants.
- Kong Zhou (Eastern Han) 19th generation descendant
- Kong Rong 20th generation descendant
- The Southern Branch of the Confucius family at Quzhou. During the Southern Song dynasty the descendant of Confucius at Qufu, the Duke Yansheng Kong Duanyou fled south with the Song Emperor to Quzhou, while the newly established Jin dynasty (1115–1234) in the north appointed Kong Duanyou's brother Kong Duancao who remained in Qufu as Duke Yansheng. From that time up until the Yuan dynasty, there were two Duke Yanshengs, one in the north in Qufu and the other in the south at Quzhou. An invitation to come back to Qufu was extended to the southern Duke Yansheng Kong Zhu by the Yuan dynasty Emperor Kublai Khan. The title was taken away from the southern branch after Kong Zhu rejected the invitation, so the northern branch of the family kept the title of Duke Yansheng. The southern branch still remained in Quzhou where they lived to this day. Confucius's descendants in Quzhou alone number 30,000. The Hanlin Academy rank of Wujing boshi (五經博士) was awarded to the southern branch at Quzhou by a Ming Emperor while the northern branch at Qufu held the title Duke Yansheng.
  - Kong Ruogu (孔若古), Kong Chuan (孔傳) 47th generation Claimed to be the ancestor of the Southern branch after Kong Zhu died by Northern branch member Kong Guanghuang. The leader of the southern branch is Kong Xiangkai (孔祥楷).
- Kong Daofu (孔道輔), 45th generation, Grand Master of Remonstrance of the Right under Emperor Renzong of Song
- Kong Zonghan (孔宗翰), 46th generation, Song dynasty official
- Kong Zongyuan (孔宗願), 46th generation
- Kong Ruozhuo (孔若拙), 47th generation
- Kong Yu (孔瑀), 49th generation
- Kong Zongshou (孔宗壽 46th generation
- Kong Jian (孔僉)
- Kong Shuxuan (孔淑玄)
- Kong Yingda, 32nd generation descendant, son of Kong An (孔安) 31st generation, son of Kong Shuo (孔碩) 30th generation, son of Kong Linggui (孔靈龜 29th generation, descendant of Kong Yang (孔扬) 22nd generation, son of Kong Yu (孔郁) 21st generation, 7th generation descendant of Kong Fu, 孔福). His father is not to be confused with the other Kong An (孔安) shown on the tree who was a 17th generation descendant who lived during the Eastern Han dynasty.
- Kong Xiuyuan (孔休源) 32nd generation
- Kong Zongfan (孔宗笵) 33rd generation
- Kong Yuntong (孔雲童) 33rd generation
- Kong Keren (孔克仁) 55th generation descendant.
- Kong Gongxun (孔公恂), 58th generation
- Kong Wenji (孔聞籍), 62nd generation
- Kong Zhenkan (孔貞堪), 63rd generation, Magistrate of Qufu, surrendered to Li Zicheng.
- Kong Shangze (孔尚則) 64th generation.
- Kong Shangren 64th generation descendant
- Kung Tian Cheng (孔天增), 72nd generation descendant, First Clerk of Raffles Library, Singapore, then Chief Librarian of Yuan Shikai's Presidential Library
- Kong Xianglin (K'ung Hsiang-lin, 孔祥霖) 75th generation descendant
- H. H. Kung (Kong Xiangxi) 75th generation descendant, son of Kong Fanci (孔繁慈)
  - His children were Kong Lingyi (Kung Ling-i, 孔令儀), Kong Lingkan (Kung Ling-k'an, 孔令侃), Kong Lingjun (Kung Ling-chun, 孔令俊), and Kong Lingjie (Kung Ling-chie, 孔令傑). One of H. H. Kung's sons, Kong Lingjie (孔令傑) married Debra Paget who gave birth to Gregory Kung (孔德基).
- Kong Xianglin (孔祥林), philosopher, Deputy Dean of the Research Institute of Confucianism, Director of the Qufu Committee for the Preservation of Cultural Relics.
- Kong Fanqi (孔繁琪), 74th generation descendant, mother of Li Fengshan (李鳳山) and grandmother of Ann Li (李怜宜)
- Kong Zhaoshou 71st generation descendant
- Kong Zhaowei (孔昭巍), 71st generation descendant
- Kong Deyong, 77th generation descendant
- Kong Xiangxian, Chinese Muslim, 75th generation descendant
- Kong Dejun (孔德軍) Chinese Muslim Islamic scholar, 77th generation descendant
- Kong Lingjun (孔令儁), 76th generation descendant
- Gokbu Gong clan (Korean: 곡부 공씨): During the Yuan dynasty, Gong So (孔紹/공소, 1304–1381), who claimed to be a son of Kong Huan (孔浣), moved from China to Goryeo era Korea during Toghon Temür's rule. Gong So's descendants have established numerous cadet branches to the modern era.

== Generation name ==
Along with the descendants of the other Four Sages (Confucius, Mencius, Zengzi, and Yan Hui), the descendants of Confucius still determine part of their children's given names using this generation poem given to them by the Ming dynasty Jianwen Emperor and extended by later emperors:

希言公彥承，宏聞貞尚衍；
興毓傳繼廣，昭憲慶繁祥；
令德維垂佑，欽紹念顯揚；
建道敦安定，懋修肇彝常；
裕文煥景瑞，永錫世緒昌。

== See also ==
- Duke Yansheng (the title of these descendants since the Song dynasty)
- Confucius Genealogy Compilation Committee
- 孔子世家 Well known individual descendants of Confucius listed by generation
- 孔子世家大宗世系 Family tree tracing descent from the Yellow Emperor down to the Dukes of Yansheng
- 孔子世家南宗北宗世系图 Family tree showing the split between the Northern and Southern branches of Confucius descendants.
- 孔子世家总世系图 (中兴祖前)
- 孔子世家谱 History of the Confucius Family Tree compilation
- 孔子世家四支和五位的世系圖 Cadet branches which break off at Kong Renyu 孔仁玉.
- 孔子世家五凝世系图 Cadet branches from the five sons of Kong Zhaohuan 孔昭煥
- 孔子世家十二府世系图 The 12 cadet branches descended from Kong Xingxie 孔兴燮

== Bibliography ==
- Records of the Grand Historian: Annals of the Shang Dynasty (史記·殷本紀)
- Wang Guowei, Guantang Jilin (觀堂集林)
- Records of the Grand Historian: House of Song Weizi (史記·宋微子世家)
- Records of the Grand Historian: House of Kongzi (史記·孔子世家)
- Chunqiu Zuozhuan Zhengyi (春秋左傳正義·昭公七年)
- Book of Han: Annals of Emperor Cheng (漢書·成帝紀)
- Book of Han: Table of nobles from families of the imperial consorts (漢書·外戚恩澤表)
- Book of Han: Biographies of Kuang, Zhang, Kong and Ma (漢書·匡張孔馬傳)
- Book of the Later Han: Biographies of Confucians (後漢書·儒林傳上·孔僖傳)
- Annotation of Book of the Later Han: Biographies of Confucians (後漢書注·儒林傳上·孔僖傳)
- New Book of Tang: Table of genealogy of Chancellors V (新唐書·宰相世系表五)
- History of Song: Biographies of Confucians I (宋史·儒林一·孔宜傳)
- History of Song: Rites 22 (宋史•志第七十二)
- History of Jin: Biography of Kong Fan (金史·孔璠傳)
- History of Yuan: Biography of Kong Sihui (元史·孔思晦傳)
- History of Ming: Biographies of Confucians III (明史·儒林三·孔希學傳)
- Draft History of Qing: Biographies of Confucians IV (清史稿·儒林四)
- Liancongzi (連從子·敘書)
- Genealogy Book of House of Kongzi (孔子世家谱). Shandong Friendship Publishing House. ISBN 7-80551-265-5
- Family Sayings of Confucius (孔子家語)
