= CGCC =

CGCC may refer to:

- Chandler-Gilbert Community College
- China General Chamber of Commerce-U.S.A.
- Coastal Georgia Community College
- Columbia Gorge Community College
- Columbia-Greene Community College
- Confucius Genealogy Compilation Committee
- Canwest Global Communications Corporation
