= Emory Richard Johnson =

American economist (1864-1950)

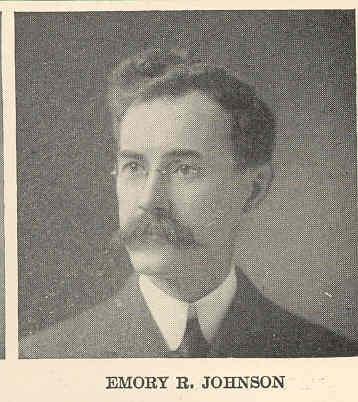
- Born: March 22, 1864; Waupun, Wisconsin, U.S.
- Died: March 8, 1950 (aged 85); Philadelphia, Pennsylvania, U.S.
- Burial place: West Laurel Hill Cemetery, Bala Cynwyd, Pennsylvania, U.S.
- Education: University of Wisconsin; University of Pennsylvania
- Occupations: Professor of transportation and commerce, dean Wharton School

Emory Richard Johnson (March 22, 1864 – March 8, 1950) was an American economist who pioneered transportation studies in the United States. He was professor of transportation and commerce at the University of Pennsylvania and served as dean of the Wharton School from 1919 to 1933. He was a member of the Isthmian Canal Commission from 1899 to 1904 and was instrumental in the design of tolls for ships using the Panama Canal.

He was editor of the Annals of the American Academy of Political and Social Science from 1901 to 1914, published multiple books on the economics of transportation, and received the gold medal of honor from the National Institute of Social Sciences in 1923.

== Early life and education ==
Johnson was born March 22, 1864, in Waupun, Wisconsin, to Eli and Angeline (Nicholas) Johnson. He graduated from the University of Wisconsin in 1888 and the University of Pennsylvania in 1893. He studied in Germany and received his Doctor of Science and Doctor of Philosophy degrees from the University of Pennsylvania in 1913. He was a member of the Phi Beta Kappa society and the Sigma Chi fraternity.

== Career ==
He was an instructor of economics at Haverford College from 1893 to 1896. He became professor of transportation and commerce at the University of Pennsylvania in 1896. He was the first specialized business professor at Wharton and was a pioneer in transportation studies in the United States. In 1889, he served as an expert on transportation on the Industrial Commission; on valuation of railway property for the United States Census Bureau from 1904 to 1905; and on traffic on the National Waterways Commission of 1909. He served as dean of the Wharton School from 1919 to 1933.

He was a member of the Isthmian Canal Commission from 1899 to 1904. He was instrumental in the design of tolls for the canal based on ship measurements and cargo size. In 1907, he arbitrated the dispute between the Southern Pacific Company and the Order of Railroad Telegraphers. In 1911, he furnished a report on Panama Canal traffic for President William Howard Taft. In 1913, he worked as the state regulator of railroads for Pennsylvania. He helped set the U.S. national transportation policy as a member of the Chamber of Commerce's Executive Committee for the National Transportation Conference. He also advised the transportation industry on the regulatory strategy for the Transportation Act of 1920.

He published multiple books on the economics of transportation. He was editor of the Annals of the American Academy of Political and Social Science from 1901 to 1914. He was director of the Bureau of Municipal Research, the Philadelphia Maritime Exchange, and the Geographical Society of Philadelphia.

He was elected to the American Philosophical Society in 1915. He was a member of the American Economic Association, the Cosmos Club, the National Geographic Society, and the Union League of Philadelphia. In 1923, he received the gold medal of honor from the National Institute of Social Sciences.

In 1926 he travelled to China; in Shandong he met the 6-year-old Duke Yansheng Kung Te-cheng, 77th generation descendant of Confucius, and invited him to attend the University of Pennsylvania. He died in Philadelphia on March 8, 1950, and was interred at West Laurel Hill Cemetery in Bala Cynwyd, Pennsylvania.

== Publications ==
- Inland Waterways, Their Relation to Transportation, Philadelphia: American Academy of Political and Social Science, 1893
- American Railway Transportation, New York: D. Appleton and Company, 1903
- Ocean and Inland Transportation, New York: D. Appleton and Company, 1906
- Elements of Transportation, New York: D. Appleton and Company, 1909
- Railroad Traffic and Rates, New York: D. Appleton and Company, 1911
- Panama Canal Traffic and Tolls, Washington, D.C.: Government Printing Office, 1912
- Measurement of Vessels for the Panama Canal, Washington, D.C.; Government Printing Office, 1913
- History of Domestic and Foreign Commerce in the United States, Washington, D.C.; Carnegie Institution of Washington, 1915
- The Panama Canal and Commerce, New York: D. Appleton and Company, 1916
- Principles of Railroad Transportation, New York: D. Appleton and Company, 1916
- Principles of Ocean Transportation, New York: D. Appleton and Company, 1918
- Transportation in the United States, Chicago: LaSalle Extension University, 1919
- Principles of Transportation, New York: D. Appleton and Company, 1929
