= Jingcheng =

Jingcheng may refer to:

- Xu Jingcheng (許景澄) (1845–1900), Qing Dynasty diplomat
- Jingcheng (竟成), a pseudonym of educator Kong Zhaoshou
- Jingcheng, a name for Beijing's inner city
- Jingcheng, Nanjing County, Zhangzhou (靖城镇), a town in Nanjing County, Zhangzhou, Fujian Province, China
- Jingcheng, Changjiang, Jingdezhen (竟成镇), a town in Jiangxi Province, China
- Jingcheng Railway (京承铁路; Jīngchéng Tiělù), commonly called Beijing–Chengde Railway
- Jingcheng Expressway, the former name of the part of the G45 Daqing–Guangzhou Expressway north of Beijing
- Jīngchéng, an alternate Romanization of Chang'an, an ancient Chinese city

== See also ==
- Jincheng, prefecture-level city in Shanxi, China
- Jincheng 1 UAV (金诚), an unmanned helicopter
