= Kung Te-cheng =

Ceremonial Official to Confucius (1920–2008)

Kong Te-cheng
- Ceremonial Official to Confucius
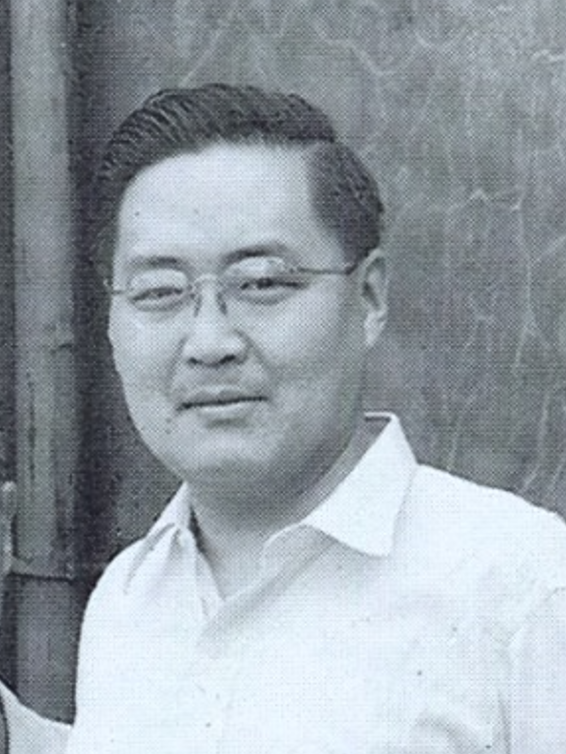
- Kong Te-cheng, in 1951

President of the Examination Yuan
- Term: 17 August 1984 – 24 April 1993
- Predecessor: Liu Chi-hung
- Successor: Chiu Chuang-huan

Duke Yansheng
- Tenure: 6 June 1920 – 7 July 1935
- Predecessor: Kong Lingyi
- Successor: Himself as Sacrificial Official to Confucius

Sacrificial Official to Confucius
- Tenure: 8 July 1935 – 28 October 2008
- Predecessor: Himself as Duke Yansheng
- Successor: Kung Tsui-chang
- Born: 23 February 1920; Kong Family Mansion, Qufu, Shandong, Republic of China
- Died: 28 October 2008 (aged 88); Xindian, Taipei County, Republic of China
- Spouse: Sun Qi-fang (m. 1936)
- Issue: Lucy Wei-O Kong; Kong Wei-yi; Kong Weilai; Kong Weining
Names
- Kong Decheng 孔德成
- Father: Kong Lingyi, Duke Yansheng
- Mother: Wang Baocui, concubine

Kong Te-cheng (Chinese: 孔德成; pinyin: Kǒng Déchéng; Wade–Giles: K'ung Te-ch'eng) (23 February 1920 – 28 October 2008) was a 77th generation descendant of Confucius in the main line of descent. He was the final person to be appointed Duke Yansheng and the first Sacrificial Official to Confucius. He helped formulate and was in charge of officiating the modern Confucius ceremony held annually in the Republic of China (Taiwan). In addition to Ceremonial Official, he held numerous posts in the Republic of China government, including member of the National Assembly from 1946 to 1991, President of the Examination Yuan from 1984 to 1993, and senior advisor to the President of the Republic of China from 1948 to 2000. He held professorships at National Taiwan University, Fu Jen Catholic University, and Soochow University.

== Birth and early life ==
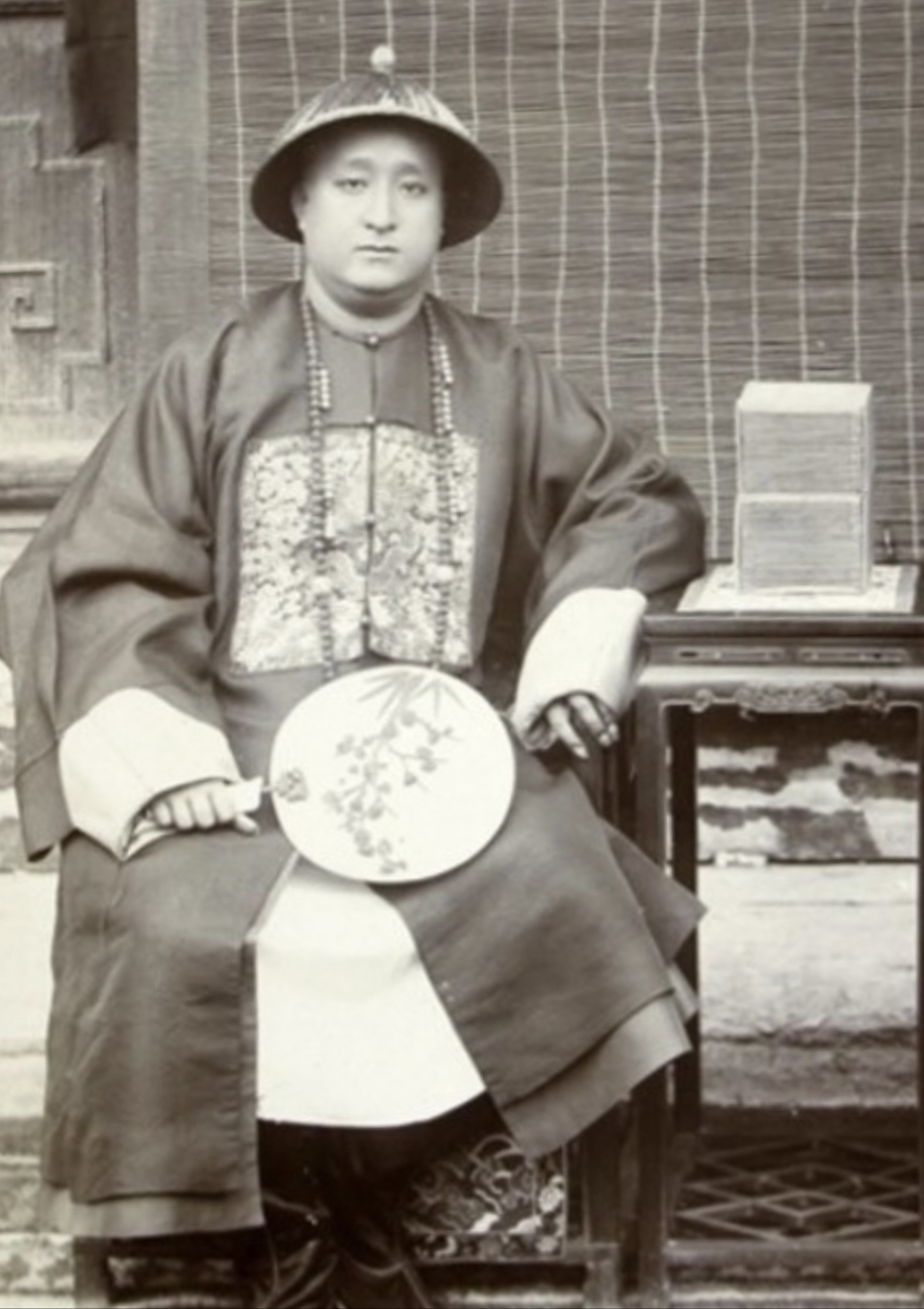
Kong Te-cheng's father, Kong Lingyi, in 1904

Kong was born in his family estate in Qufu, Shandong. He was the third child and only son of Kong Lingyi (孔令貽, 1872–1919), Duke Yansheng, by his second concubine, Wang Baocui (王寶翠, 1894–1921). His father's name contained the character 令 Ling because it was the generation name for 76th generation descendants of Confucius. On 6 June 1920, shortly after his birth, he was appointed Duke Yansheng by President Xu Shichang in accordance with an imperial tradition dating back to 1055 of bestowing the title on the eldest male in each generation of the main line of descent. His father had died before Kong Te-cheng's birth. Kong Te-cheng became the last person to be granted the centuries-old dukedom when the title was abolished by the Nationalist Government in 1935 and replaced with that of Ceremonial Official to Confucius (大成至聖先師奉祀官, literally "Ceremonial Officer of the Great Accomplished and Most Sacred Teacher").

At the age of 6, in Shandong he met University of Pennsylvania dean Emory Johnson, who invited him to attend the university.

== Political career ==
The Japanese offered him the position of puppet Emperor of China in 1937, but Kong declined the offer.

In January 1938, Kong fled the Japanese invasion of Shandong to Hankou. The Japanese blew up his Sacred Mount Taishan residence. Premier H. H. Kong, also a descendant of Confucius, greeted Duke Kong Te-cheng as he arrived. TIME magazine addressed him by the title "Duke Kung", and referred to his residence as the "ducal seat".

In response to talk of Japanese offers to make him "ruler of China", Kong said: "I have never even been approached by the Japanese! I consider myself at the orders of the Chinese Government. I am a patriot, ready to take up arms and fight the Japanese as soon as I reach the age of military service—that is 18 years... my wife is expecting a child."

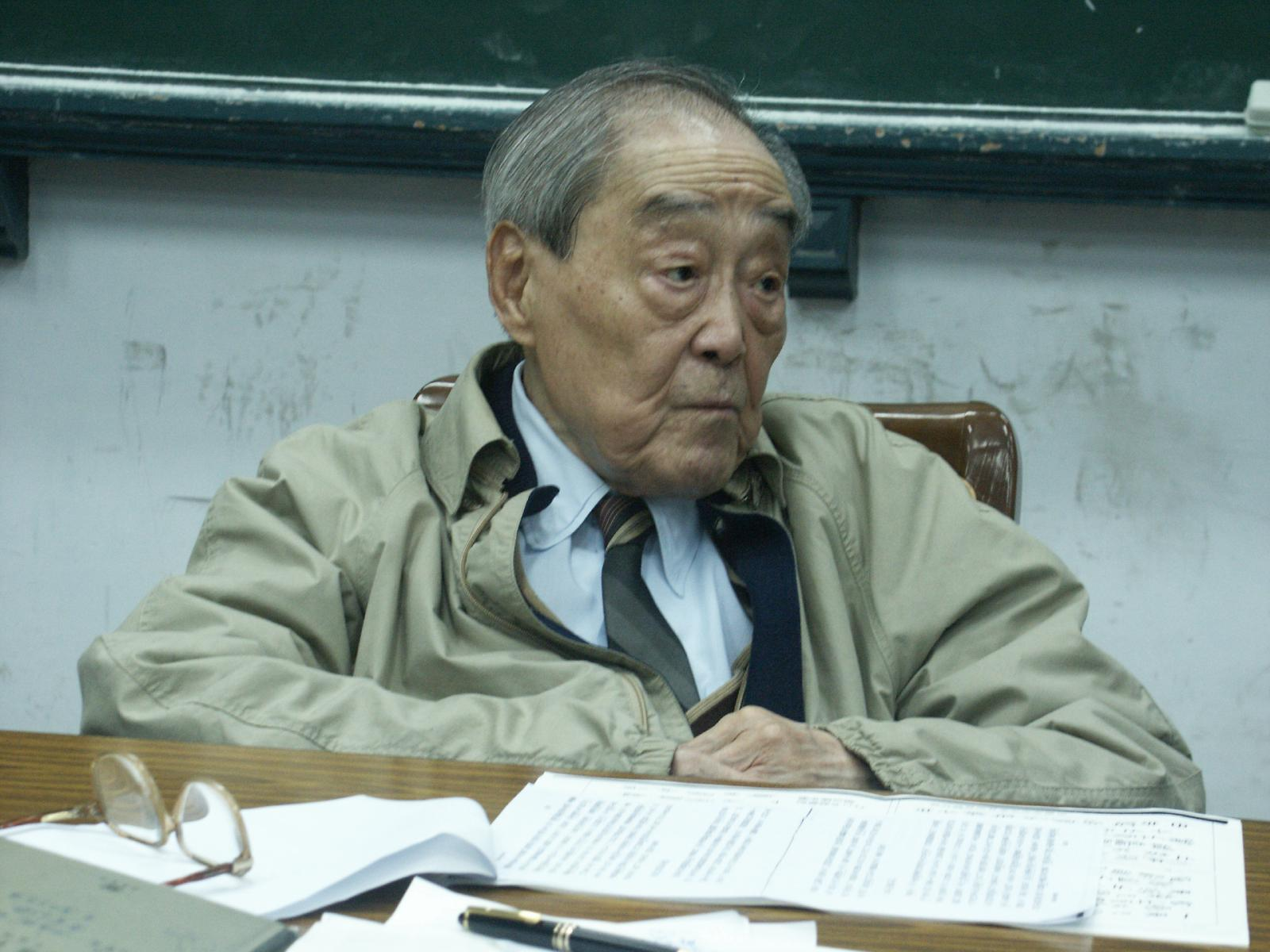
Kong in 2005

He was a member of the National Assembly of the Republic of China from 1946 to 1991 and helped draft the 1947 Constitution of the Republic of China. From July 1956 to April 1964 he was Director of National Palace Museum in Taipei. Kong served as President of the Examination Yuan from 1984 to 1993. He was a senior adviser to the President of the Republic of China from 1948 to 2000.

== Family ==
Kong's name included 德 Dé, the generation name for 77th generation descendants of Confucius. Kong's father, Kong Lingyi (孔令貽, 1872–1919), inherited the Dukedom Yansheng in 1876, upon the death of his father, the 30th Duke Yansheng. Kong founded a county school in Qufu and was also president of the Four Clans Teachers' College (founded in conjunction with the descendants of Yan Hui, Mencius, and Zeng Zi). In 1889, he was appointed to the Guozijian. Following the Xinhai Revolution, Kong was given a government post in the new government but declined the position. Kong was a supporter of Yuan Shikai and was given a First Grade Medal and Sash of Auspicious Glory and the rank of Prince of the First Rank by Yuan in 1915.

Kong Lingyi had a total of two wives and two concubines. His first wife, Lady Sun (孫氏), was the fifth daughter of Sun Yuwen (孫毓汶, 1833–1899), an Imperial Envoy, and she was one year older than Kong. Lady Sun's grandfather, Sun Ruizhen (孫瑞珍, 1783–1858), was a scholar and official during the Guangxu Emperor's reign. Kong and Lady Sun married in 1888, but she died of illness without issue in 1899, aged 28. Kong's first concubine, Lady Feng, similarly did not have any children, and she died in 1926. Kong's second wife, Tao Wenpu, (陶文譜, known as Lady Tao [陶氏]), was the fifth daughter of Tao Shiyun (陶式鋆), Magistrate of Daming Prefecture, and Kong married her in 1905; compared with Lady Sun, though Tao family was rich at the time, it wasn't as prominent as Sun family. She bore Kong one son who died at the age of three year. As of 1914, one of Lady Tao's maids, named Wang Baocui, became the second concubine of Kong Lingyi; Wang was a daughter from a peasant from Zunhua County, Hebei, and she bore two daughters in 1913 and 1917. On 4 October 1919, Kong Lingyi went to Beijing after receiving news about the death of his father-in-law, Tao Shiyun. Soon afterwards, Kong was afflicted with a subcutaneous ulcer on his back. He died on 8 November 1919 at the Mansion of the Duke of Yansheng (衍聖公府) in Beijing. At the time of his father's death, Kong Te-cheng's mother, Wang Baocui, was five months pregnant, and on 23 February 1920, she gave birth to Kong. Seventeen days later, on 11 March 1920, Wang died.

Kong had two older sisters, both borne by his mother Wang Baocui. The elder, Kong Deqi (孔德齊, 1913–1939), married the youngest son of Feng Shu (馮恕), a Beijing calligrapher and founder of Beijing Electric Lamp Company, in 1931, but died as a young woman. The younger, Kong Demao (孔德懋, 1917–2021), married Ke Changfen (柯昌汾), third and youngest son of Qing dynasty historian Ke Shaomin (柯劭忞), in 1935. Ke Shaomin's sworn brother was President Xu Shichang. Kong Demao had two sons and two daughters, and she lived in mainland China and had written a book about her experiences growing up at the family estate in Qufu.

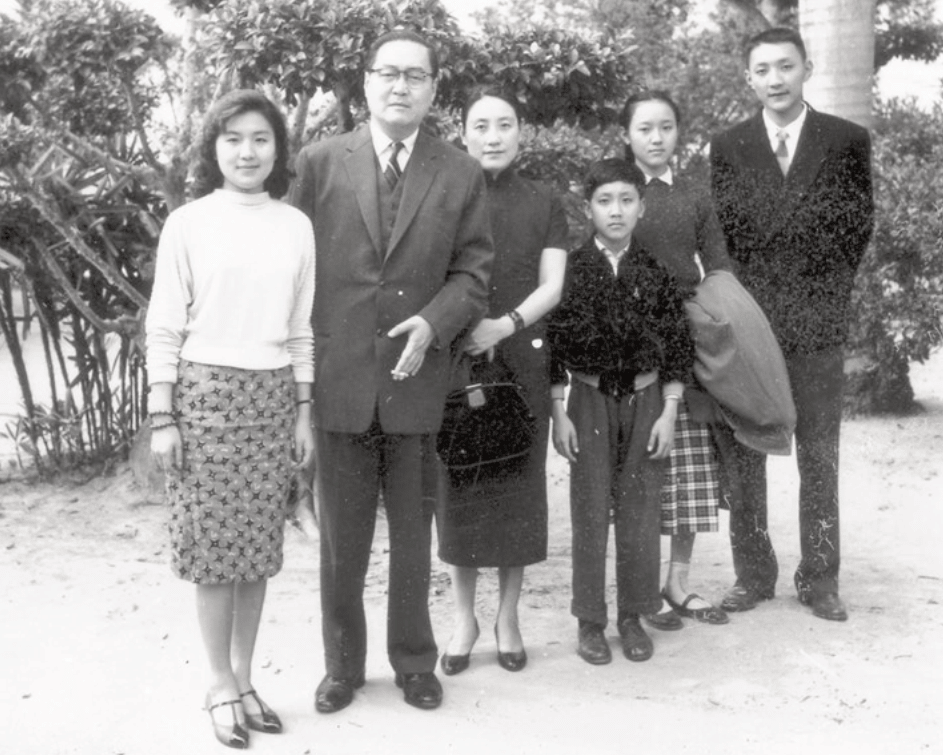
Kong family, 1959

Kong married Sun Qifang (孫琪方, 1918–2012), a great-granddaughter of Qing dynasty scholar-official Sun Jianai (孫家鼐), who was the first president of Peking University, on 16 December 1936. Sun's ancestral home was in Shouxian, Anhui, and his family's business combine (one of the first in modern China) includes the Fou Foong Flour Company (阜豐麵粉廠). They had four children, two sons and two daughters:

- Lucy Wei-O Kong (孔維鄂, b. 10 January 1938- 3 January 2026), elder daughter of Kong Te-cheng, married to Major Lester Mykel Conger (包雅志) in 1960, and they had one child, George Sean Conger (包尚恩); she lives in the United States.
- Kong Wei-yi (孔維益, 7 November 1940 – 25 February 1990), elder son of Kong Te-cheng; married Yu Yuejie (于曰潔) on 17 January 1968 and had one son, the 79th lineal descendant Kong Tsui-chang (b. 1975), and one daughter, Kong Tsui-mei (孔垂梅, b. 1970).
- Kong Weilai (孔維崍, b. 1942), second daughter of Kong Te-cheng; married in 1973 to Lee Sha (李莎) and have a son and a daughter.
- Kong Weining (孔維寧, 1948 – 10 June 2010), second son of Kong Te-cheng; married Wu Ya (吳涯) on 7 December 1974 and had two daughters, Kong Chuijiu (孔垂玖) and Kong Chuiyong (孔垂永).

His children all have 維 Wei in their name since it is a generation name, signifying that they are 78th generation descendants of Confucius.

== Death ==
On 20 October 2008, Kong was sent to Tzu Chi hospital in Sindian City. He acquired pneumonia and sepsis when he arrived at the emergency department. Kong died 8 days later, on 28 October 2008 at 10:50 am, of heart and respiratory failure. The ROC Ministry of the Interior appointed his grandson Kung Tsui-chang to succeed him as Sacrificial Official to Confucius.

== Ancestry ==
Ancestors of Kung Te-cheng

16. Kong Qingrong (孔慶鎔), Duke Yansheng
8. Kong Fanhao (孔繁灝), Duke Yansheng
17. Bi Hwaizhu (畢懷珠)
4. Kong Xiangke (孔祥珂), Duke Yansheng
18. Bi Ezhu (畢鄂珠)
9. Bi Jinghwan (畢景桓)
19. Lady Jiang (姜氏)
2. Kong Lingyi (孔令貽), Duke Yansheng
20. Peng Yunzhang (彭蘊章)
10. Peng Zufen (彭祖芬)
21. Lady Xu (徐氏)
5. Lady Peng (彭氏)
22. Zhou Eryong (周爾墉)
11. Lady Zhou (周氏)
23. Lady Wan (萬氏)
1. Kong Te-cheng
3. Wang Baocui (王寶翠), concubine

Chinese nobility
Preceded by Kong Lingyi	Duke Yansheng; 1920–1935	Abolished
Political offices
New creation	Sacrificial Official to Confucius; 1935–2008	Succeeded by Kung Tsui-chang
Preceded by Liu Chi-hung	President of Examination Yuan; 1984–1993	Succeeded by Chiu Chuang-huan
