= Kung Tsui-chang =

Taiwanese official (born 1975)

- 孔垂長
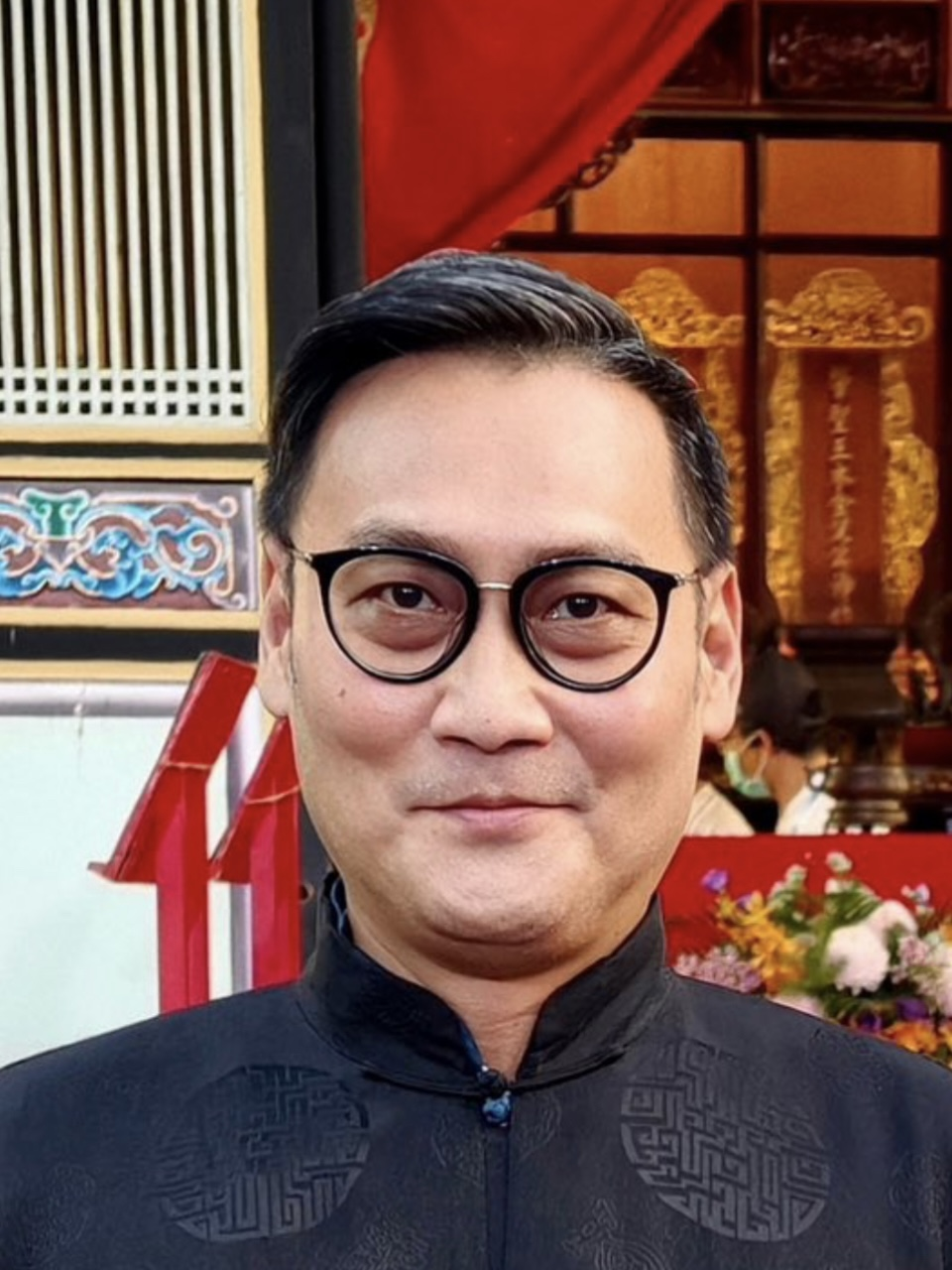
- Kung in 2025

2nd Sacrificial Official to Confucius
- Incumbent
- Assumed office 25 September 2009
- Appointed by: Ma Ying-jeou (as President of the Republic of China)
- Preceded by: Kung Te-cheng

Personal details
- Born: 1 July 1975 (age 50) National Taiwan University Hospital, Taipei City, Taiwan
- Spouse: Wu Shuo-yin (m. 2005)

Chinese name
- Traditional Chinese: 孔垂長
- Simplified Chinese: 孔垂长
Transcriptions
Standard Mandarin
- Hanyu Pinyin: Kǒng Chuícháng
- Bopomofo: ㄎㄨㄥˇ ㄔㄨㄟˊ ㄔㄤˊ

Kung Tsui-chang (Chinese: 孔垂長; born 1 July 1975) is a 79th-generation descendant of Confucius in the main line of descent, and the 2nd Sacrificial Official to Confucius in the Republic of China (Taiwan). Kung was named an Honorary Professor of Shandong University and Honorary Dean at Qufu Normal University.

== Biography ==
=== Early life ===
Kung Tsui-chang was born on 1 July 1975 in the National Taiwan University Hospital, and he is the son and second child of Kung Wei-yi. He was named by his paternal grandfather, Kung Te-cheng; the tsui (垂) character in the given name is the generation name for 79th-generation descendants of Confucius, while chang (長) character stands for "long [history of the family]". As the Sacrificial Official to Confucius, Kung Te-cheng reported the birth of his grandson to the Ministry of the Interior. As Kung Wei-yi predeceased his father in 1989, Kung Tsui-chang became the heir apparent to his grandfather's hereditary title. During his upbringing, Kung family didn't ask him to study either the Four Books and Five Classics or Confucianism, and he rarely participated in Shidian rituals; graduated from Dongshan Senior High School in Taipei, he studied in Box Hill Institute, Australia, and returned to Taiwan to work in a company of his maternal family.

In later years, due to advanced age and health concerns as of 2000s, Kung Te-cheng appointed his grandson as probationary Sacrificial Official in 2004 in order to pass on the responsibilities gradually. By the next year, Kung Tsui-chang married Wu Shuo-yin (吳碩茵), one of the colleagues at the company he was employed by; on 1 January 2006 in the National Taiwan University Hospital, Wu gave birth to a son, whom Kung Te-cheng named Kung Yu-jen (孔佑仁) a month later. Invited by Hiroike Institute of Education (廣池学園), Kung Tsui-chang visited Japan with his newborn son and his family, and were later interviewed by the French magazine Point de vue. The couple also have a daughter, Kung Yu-xin (孔佑心).

=== Becoming the official ===
While the Sacrificial Official to Confucius was a paid position as civil servant in the Ministry of the Interior, Kung family regards the position as an honorary title and declined the salary for years. After the death of Kung Te-cheng in 2008, the Ministry of the Interior turned the position into a non-paid one, while other Sacrificial Officials will lapse upon the incumbent’s death; according to revision of the relevant regulations, descendants of Confucius and bearing the surname Kung have succession right to the Sacrificial Official to Confucius, regardless of gender. Kung Tsui-chang succeeded the Sacrificial Official to Confucius on 25 September 2009.

After the appointment, Kung resigned from his previous job and works into promoting Confucianism and Chinese culture. He also became the youngest senior advisor, during the presidency of Ma Ying-jeou. With assistance from the committee of Taipei Confucius Temple and several affiliated associations, Kung regularly holds Confucian rites and traditional ceremonies, with Meng Ling-ji (孟令繼, 76th-generation descendant of Mencius) and descendants of Zengzi. In accordance with the aforementioned reforms, there were three incumbent sacrificial officials (to Confucius, Mencius, and Zengzi respectively); since the presidency of Tsai Ing-wen onwards, Kung Tsui-chang becomes the only Sacrificial Official in the Ministry of the Interior.

=== Overseas activities ===
In Taiwan, Kung Tsui-chang founded the Chinese Association of Confucius (中華大成至聖先師孔子協會); while in Mainland China - under the administration of the People's Republic of China - he also founded the Confucius Foundation (至圣孔子基金会). Invited by the municipal government of Qufu, Kung held ancestral rites in the Temple of Confucius, Qufu and Cemetery of Confucius for the first time, in August 2011. Additionally, Kung received titles such as Honorary Professor of Shandong University and Honorary Dean at Qufu Normal University; during the Qingming Festival, he also revisited Qufu several times for ancestral rites in the Cemetery of Confucius and Shidian ceremony in Mount Ni. In 2019, in memory of his late grandfather, Kung held a special commemorative exhibition, "The Ultimate Confucian Professor Kung Te-cheng: A Centennial Celebration" (儒者之風——孔德成先生百年紀念展), in the Sun Yat-sen Memorial Hall in Taipei. Various guests including Sŏnggyun'gwan Confucian representatives from South Korea, and Yan Bing-gang (颜秉刚, grandson of the last Sacrificial Official to Yan Hui in Mainland China) visited Taiwan for the exhibition.

Kung was invited during the 2024 ritual in Taku Seibyō, Japan, and then he met Yasuo Fukuda, former Prime Minister of Japan, in Tokyo; in the same year, he gathered representatives of various branches from the Kung clan in Beijing, to have meeting about genealogy revision project. Lee Eun-ho (이은호), the representative of Korean Mission in Taipei, visited Taipei Confucius Temple and met Kung in July 2025; in October of the same year, Kung visited the Nanyang Confucian Association in Singapore.

== Ancestry ==
Ancestors of Kung Tsui-chang

16. Kung Xiang-ke (孔祥珂), Duke Yansheng
8. Kung Ling-yi (孔令貽), Duke Yansheng
17. Lady Peng (彭氏)
4. Kung Te-cheng
9. Wang Bao-cui (王寶翠), concubine
2. Kung Wei-yi (孔維益)
20. Sun Chuan-mu (孫傳楘)
10. Sun Duo-kui (孫多煃)
21. Lady Wang (王氏), concubine
5. Sun Qi-fang (孫琪方)
22. Liu Zu-tang (劉祖棠)
11. Liu Xi-kun (劉熙坤)
1. Kung Tsui-chang
12. Yu Chang-tai (于昌泰)
6. Yu Su-min (于蘇民)
26. Liu En-zhu (劉恩駐)
13. Lady Liu (劉氏)
3. Yu Yue-jie (于曰潔)
7. Yu Mu Yun-he (于穆允鶴)

Political offices
Preceded by Kung Te-cheng	Sacrificial Official to Confucius; 2009-	Succeeded by Incumbent
