= Kong Zongyuan =

Song dynasty nobleman; first Duke Yansheng

Kong Zongyuan (simplified Chinese: 孔宗愿; traditional Chinese: 孔宗願, courtesy name 子莊) was a 46th generation descendant of Confucius and the first Duke Yansheng.

When Kong Shengyou (孔聖佑) died without a son, Kong Zongyuan succeeded him as Duke Wenxuan (文宣公) in 1039. In 1055, Emperor Renzong of Song renamed the title to Duke Yansheng (衍聖公). Descendants of Kong Zongyuan continued to hold the title of Duke Yansheng until 1935.

Kong Zongyuan is buried in the Cemetery of Confucius in Qufu.

== See also ==
- Family tree of Confucius in the main line of descent
