= Gokbu Gong clan =

Korean clan from Qufu, China

- Country: Korea (contemporary); China (ancestral)
- Current region: East and Southeast Asia
- Origin: Qufu, Shandong, China
- Founder: Confucius; Kong Shao (Middle Founder)
- Members: 74,135 (South Korea, 2000 census)
- Connected members: Gong Deok-gwi; Gong Sung-jin; Gong Hyung-jin; Gong Ji-young; Gong Yoo; Gong Hyo-jin; Gong Hyun-joo; Gongchan; Minzy (Gong Min-ji)

The Gokbu Gong clan (Korean: 곡부 공씨; Hanja: 曲阜 孔氏) is one of the Korean clans originally from China. Their Bon-gwan (Korean: 본관; Hanja: 本貫) are in Qufu, Shandong in China, which was also Confucius's birthplace. Qufu is known as Gokbu (Korean: 곡부) in Korean. According to the South Korean 2000 census, the number of individuals identifying with the Gokbu Gong clan was 74,135. The apical ancestor of the clan was Confucius.

In 1351, Kong Shao (孔紹, 1304–1381; known as 공소 [Gong So] in Korean), claimed to be one of the Duke Yansheng Kong Huan's (孔浣, 53rd generation descendant of Confucius) sons, and was naturalized in Goryeo as a fatherly master of Princess Noguk, who married an ordinary civilian, which was planned by Gongmin of Goryeo at the Yuan dynasty's Hanlin Academy. Kong Shao became a Menxia Shilang (Hanja: 門下侍郎) and was granted lands in the Changwon area. He subsequently became a middle founder of the Gokbu Gong clan.

As of 2009, the 5th edition of the Kong Family Tree (孔子世家譜) recorded the genealogy of Gokbu Gong clan, called Goryeo branch (Korean: 고려파; Hanja: 高麗派). The Goryeo branch is listed in the last two out of 80 volumes of the Kong Family Tree, and it is the only recorded foreign branch of Kong family.

== Genealogy ==
Gokbu Gong clan (main line descent)

– – – – – – – The dashed lines denote the adoptions

孔浣; Kong Huan ?－1283
Gong So 공소; 1304–1381
Gong Yeo 공여; 1329–1413
Gong Bu 공부; 1346–1416
Gong Dal 공달
Gong Seong-gil 공성길
Gong Seok 공석
Gong Yong 공용	Gong Jang 공장
Gong Gae-son 공개손	Gong Yeong-min 공영민	Gong Ye-dong 공예동
Gong In-baek 공인백	Gong In-nam 공인남	Gong Ui 공의
Gong Seung-won 공승원	Gong Seung-eop 공승업	Gong Se-chung 공세충
Gong Jeong-rok 공정록	Gong Jeong-sin 공정신	Gong Rin 공린	Gong Ik 공익
Gong Si-jun 공시준	Gong Si-yeol 공시열	Gong I-seong 공이성	Gong Jong-ro 공종로
Gong Se-chang 공세창	Gong Heung-ro 공흥로	Gong Jeung-ro 공증로	Gong In-ro 공인로	Gong Jin 공진
Gong Do-chang 공도창	Gong Do-gi 공도기	Gong Do-sin 공도신; 1711-？	Gong Mun-ju 공문주
Gong Heung-ju 공흥주; 1730-？	Gong Gyeong-jo 공경조
Gong Sa-gyo 공사교; 1778-？	Gong Do-byeong 공도병
Gong Mun-ho 공문호; 1794–1855	Gong Sa-ui 공사의
Gong Seong-gi 공성기; 1762-？
Gong Yun-dae 공윤대; 1803–1864
Gong Yeong-dong 공영동; 1825–1882
Gong Seong-yeol 공성열; 1847–1895
Gong Jae-bong 공재봉; 1870–1947
Gong Seok-gyu 공석규; 1894–1934
Gong Sun-taek 공순택; 1928–1992
Gong Wan-sik 공완식; 1950-	Gong Yong-sik 공용식; 1954-
♀ Gong Yun-a 공윤아; 1978-	♀ Gong Yun-yeong 공윤영; 1980-	Gong Byeong-il 공병일; 1979-	Gong Mun-do 공문도; 1981-

== See also ==
- Korean clan names of foreign origin
- Family tree of Confucius in the main line of descent
- Duke Yansheng
