= Ping Shuai Gong =

Hand-swinging form of exercise

Ping Shuai Gong (Chinese: 平甩功; pinyin: Píng Shuǎi gōng; lit. 'Swinging hand workout') is a hand-swinging, yangsheng/nourishment of life exercise pioneered by Taiwan Qigong (氣功) master Li Feng-shan (李鳳山).

== History ==
The pioneer of Pingshuai is Taiwanese Qigong master Li Fengshan.

== Benefits ==
Pingshuai is simple. It has health-giving properties. Daily Pingshuai is claimed to enhance immune system, improves balance, makes joints and muscles more flexible, fortifies muscles, joints and bones, enhances blood and Qi circulation, replenishes energy, relaxes, calms and clears the mind, and sharpens senses. Pingshuai has been claimed to cure/alleviate many ailments, including insomnia, constipation, back pain, soreness and numbness of the legs or feet, arthritis and even cancer.

Researchers observed brain waves during Pingshuai exercise. They reported that alpha waves gradually activated. In alpha state stress levels and anxiety decline, depression down and memory and creative thinking improve.

Li claimed that humans are energy, and internal energy is connected with external energy. He teaches self-control allows practitioners to better cope with the outside world.

== Practice ==
Standing with legs at shoulder width, both arms move in parallel, swinging forward up to shoulder height, then swinging back until they are behind the body. On every fifth swing, the knee slightly bends and quickly springs back.

Li recommends 3 daily periods of exercise for at least 10 minutes each time. Avoid drinking cold water immediately after the exercise.
