= Kong Qiu (Zijia) =

Kong Qiu, also called Ao, later known as Yong, courtesy name Zijia, was a Confucius fourth-generation grandson and the son of Kong Bai.

Kong Qiu was well-versed in Confucian and Daoist teachings and had a desire for seclusion. When State of Chu summoned him to serve in office, Kong Qiu refused. He died at age 45 and was buried northeast of Confucius’s tomb, leaving one son, Kong Ji, which was also the name of his grandfather, Kong Ji.
