= Confucius Genealogy Compilation Committee =

The Confucius Genealogy Compilation Committee (孔子世家谱续修工作协会) is responsible for collecting, collating and publishing the 2,500 years' worth of genealogical data associated with Confucius. The fifth edition of the Confucius genealogy was printed in September 2009. The collecting and collating of the fifth edition started in 1998, when Kong Deyong, a 77th-generation descendant, established the committee in Hong Kong. The last major previous publication of the Confucius genealogy was in 1930.

== See also ==
- Family tree of Confucius in the main line of descent
- zh:孔子世家谱
