= Duke Yansheng =

Chinese title of nobility

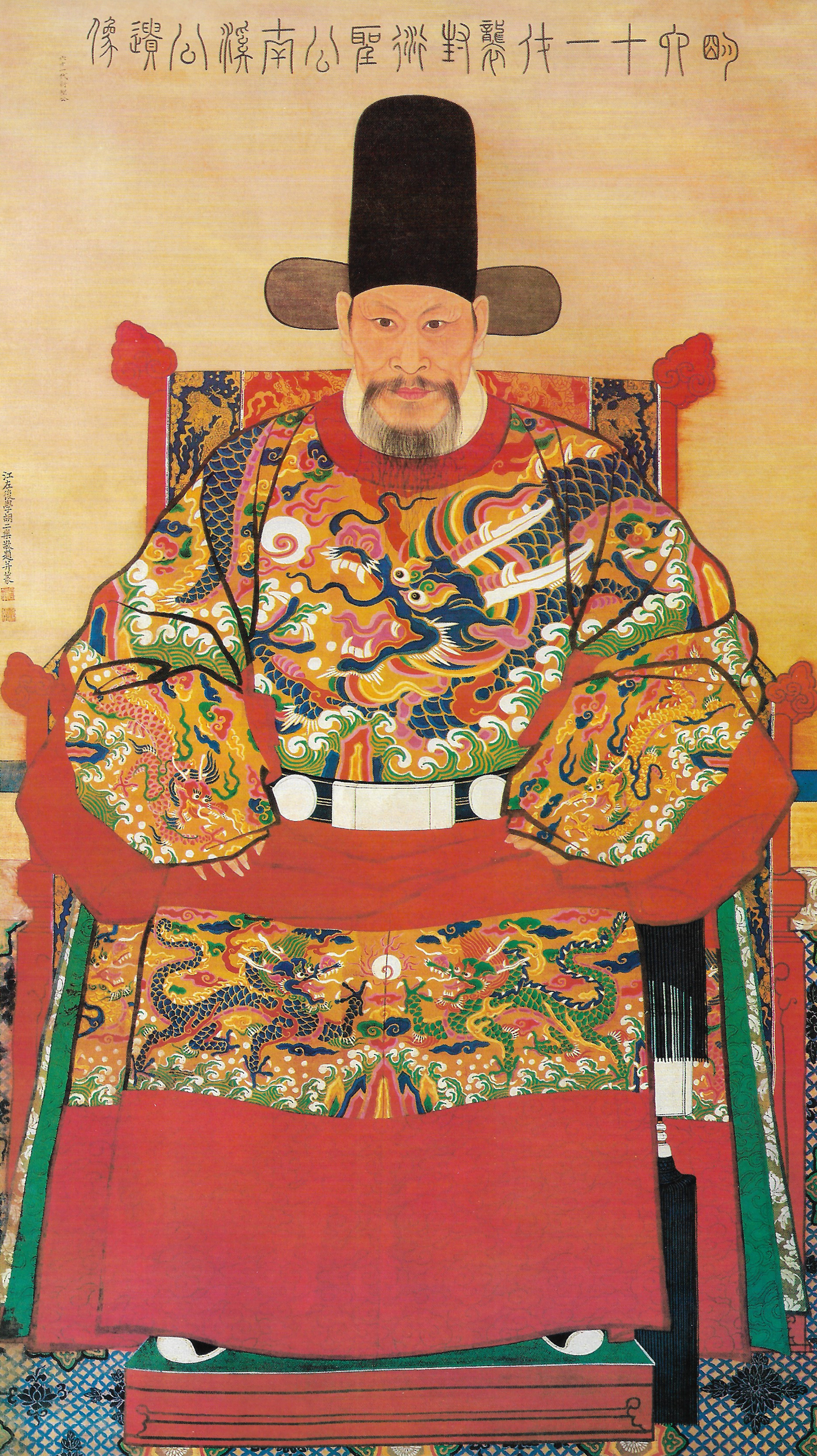
- The 61st great grandson of Confucius, and the 16th Duke Yansheng, Kong Hongxu (1448-1504)
- Creation date: 1055
- Created by: Emperors of the Song dynasty Jin dynasty Yuan dynasty Ming dynasty Qing dynasty Empire of China; Republic of China (until 1935)
- Peerage: Chinese nobility
- First holder: Kong Zongyuan (孔宗願)
- Last holder: Kung Te-cheng (孔德成) (Peerage abolished; directly succeeded by Ceremonial Official to Confucius)
- Seats: Kong Family Mansion, Qufu; Abode in Taipusi Street, Beijing

Ceremonial Official to Confucius
- Creation date: July 8, 1935
- First holder: Kung Te-cheng (孔德成) (Directly succeeded from Duke Yansheng)
- Present holder: Kung Tsui-chang
- Heir apparent: Kung Yu-jen (孔佑仁)
- Seats: Kong Family Mansion, Qufu; Abode in Taipusi Street, Beijing; Ceremonial Official Residence, Taichung

Kong or K'ung 孔
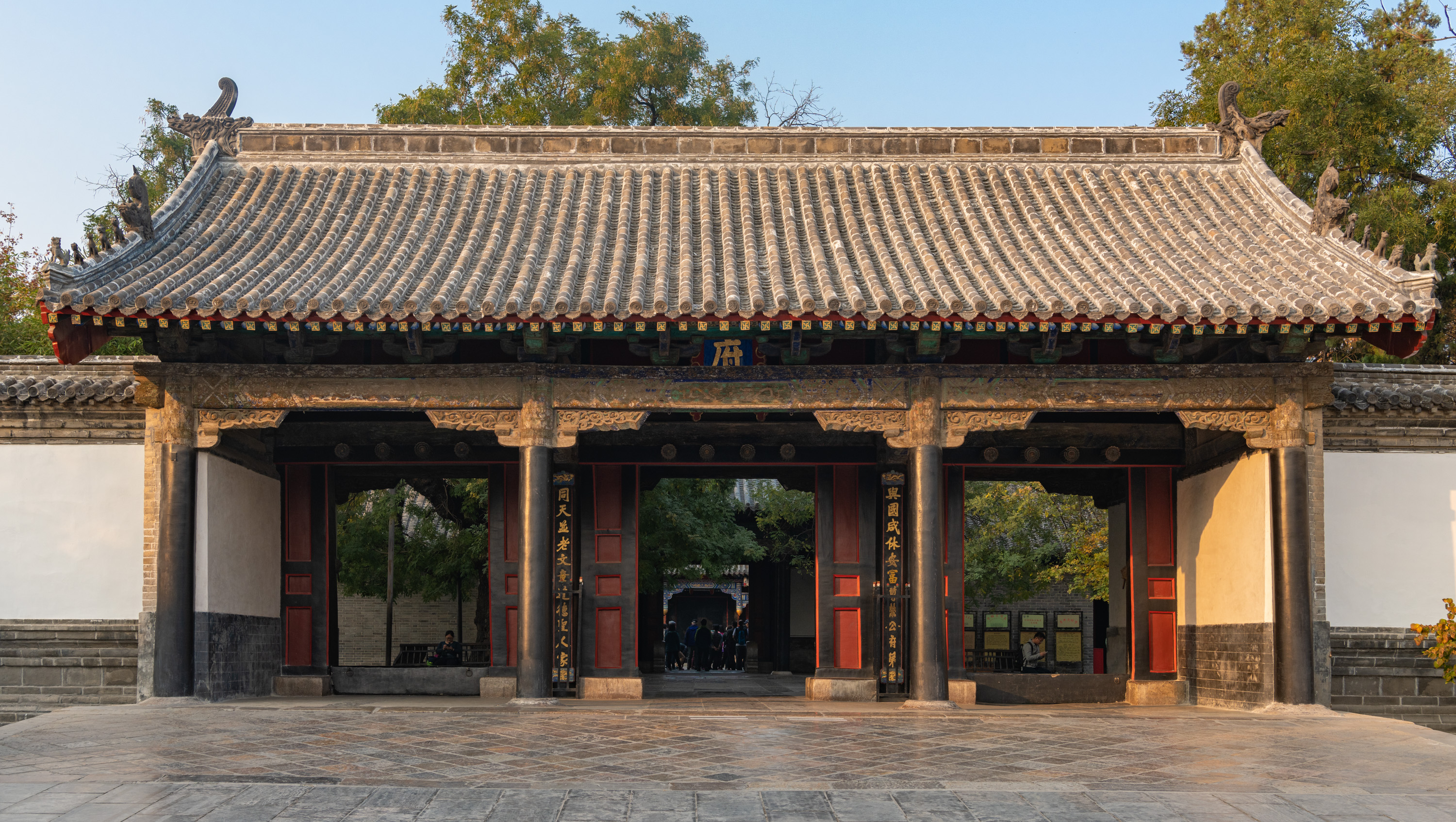
- Kong Family Mansion in Qufu, Shandong
- Parent house: Shang dynasty, State of Song
- Country: China
- Founded: 551 BC
- Founder: Confucius
- Current head: Kung Tsui-chang
- Titles: Duke Yansheng, Ceremonial Official to Confucius, Wujing Boshi, Count of Changwon
- Estates: Kong Family Mansion, Quzhou Mansion
- Cadet branches: Gokbu Gong clan (Korea)

Duke Yansheng
- Traditional Chinese: 衍聖公
- Simplified Chinese: 衍圣公
Transcriptions
Standard Mandarin
- Hanyu Pinyin: Yǎnshèng Gōng
- Wade–Giles: Yen-sheng Kung

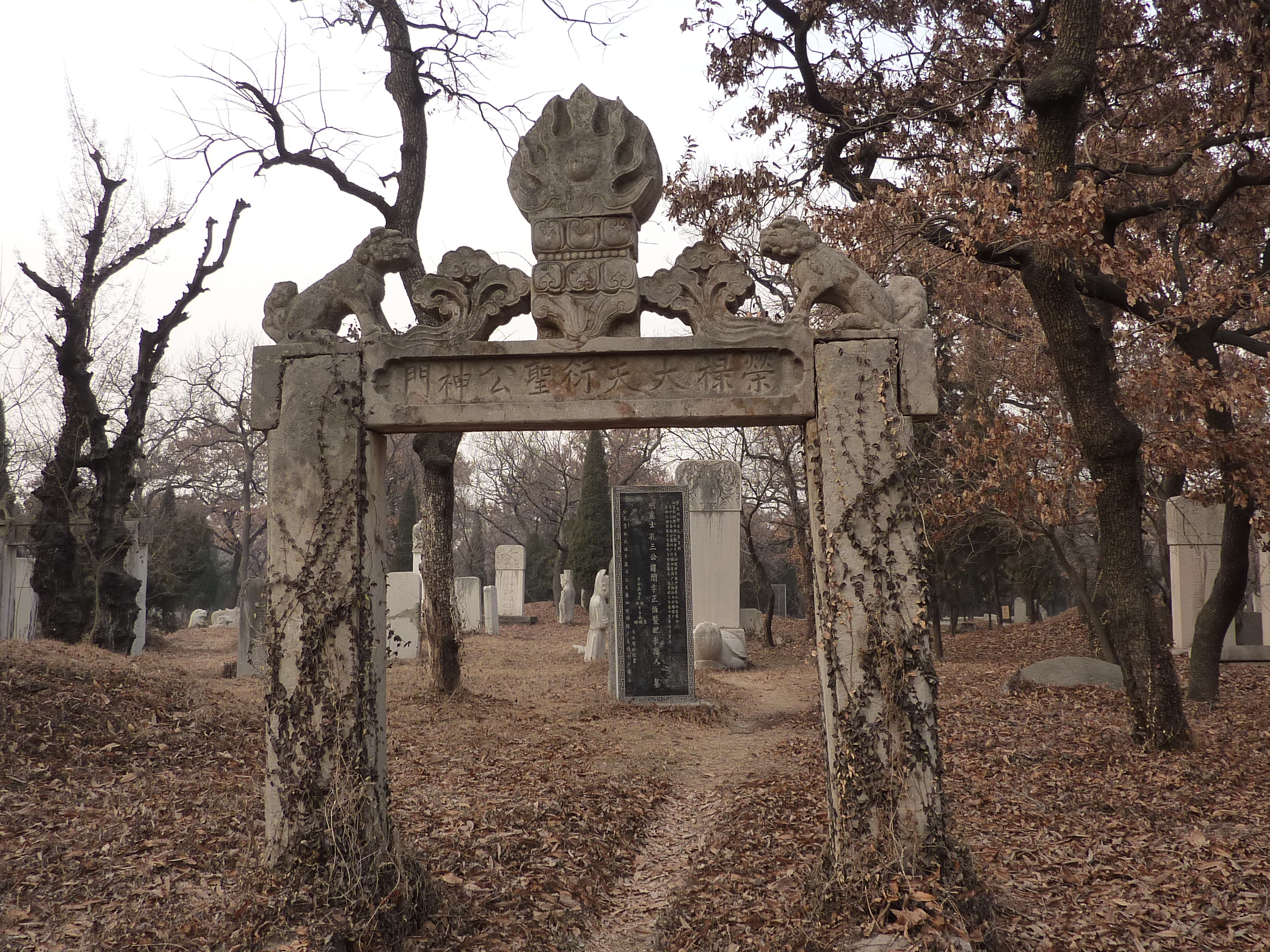
The spirit way of Kong Yanjin, the 59th-generation senior-line direct descendant of Confucius and Duke Yansheng, in the Cemetery of Confucius, Qufu.

The Duke Yansheng, literally "Honorable Overflowing with Wisdom", sometimes translated as Holy Duke of Yen, was a Chinese title of nobility. It was originally created as a marquis title in the Western Han dynasty for a direct descendant of Confucius.

From the Western Han dynasty to the mid-Northern Song dynasty, the title underwent several changes in its name, before it was finally settled as "Duke Yansheng" in 1005 by Emperor Renzong of the Northern Song dynasty. Kong Zongyuan, a 46th-generation descendant of Confucius, became the first person to hold the title "Duke Yansheng". The dukes enjoyed privileges that other nobles were denied, such as the right to tax their domain in Qufu while being exempt from imperial taxes. Their dukedom had its own judicial system and the legal capacity to mete out capital punishment, although such sentences had to be ratified by the imperial court.

In 1935, the Nationalist government of the Republic of China converted the Duke Yansheng title to a political office, "Dacheng Zhisheng Xianshi Fengsi Guan" (大成至聖先師奉祀官), which simply means "Ceremonial Official to Confucius". This political office is not only hereditary, but also had the same ranking and remuneration as that of a cabinet minister in the government of the Republic of China. In 2008, with permission from the Kong family, the political office became an unpaid one which is purely ceremonial in nature. It is currently held by Kung Tsui-chang, a 79th-generation descendant of Confucius.

There are also similar political offices for the descendants of the other notable members of the Confucian school (the Four Sages), such as "Ceremonial Official to Mencius", "Ceremonial Official to Zengzi", and "Ceremonial Official to Yan Hui". In the reformation of the law in 2009, "Ceremonial Official to Mencius" and "Ceremonial Official to Zengzi" would become unpaid honorable titles as well once the incumbent officials decease.

The tombs of the Dukes Yansheng of the Ming and Qing dynasties are located at the Cemetery of Confucius in Qufu, Shandong.

== History ==
Kong Qiu (551–479 BC), better known as Confucius, was a teacher, politician and philosopher of the State of Lu in the Spring and Autumn period of ancient China. He was a descendant of the royal family of the Shang dynasty (c. 1558–1046 BC) through the dukes of the State of Song (11th century – 286 BC).

=== Qin dynasty (221–206 BC) and the Western and Eastern Han dynasties (206 BC – 220 AD) ===
During the reign of Qin Shi Huang (r. 247–210 BC), the First Emperor of the Qin dynasty, Kong Fu (孔鮒), a ninth-generation descendant of Confucius, was awarded the title "Lord Wentong of Lu" (魯國文通君) and the appointment of shaofu (少傅).

In 190 BC, Emperor Gao of the Han dynasty awarded the title "Lord Fengsi" (奉祀君; "Ceremonial Officer") to Kong Teng (孔騰), Kong Fu's younger brother.

During the reign of Emperor Yuan (r. 48–33 BC), Kong Ba (孔霸), a 13th-generation descendant of Confucius, was granted the title "Lord Baocheng" (褒成君). In addition, the income gained from the 800 taxable households in Kong Ba's fief were used to finance the worshipping of Confucius. Kong Ba also instructed his eldest son, Kong Fu (孔福), to return to their ancestral home to serve as a ceremonial official to their ancestor.

The title "Marquis Yinshaojia" (殷紹嘉侯) was conferred on Kong Ji (孔吉), a 14th-generation di descendant of Confucius, by Emperor Cheng (r. 33–7 BC). The emperor also allowed Kong Ji to perform ritual sacrifices to Cheng Tang, the first king of the Shang dynasty, and granted him the èrwáng-sānkè (二王三恪) ceremonial privilege.

During the reign of Emperor Ping (r. 1 BC – 6 AD), granted the title "Marquis Baocheng" (褒成侯) to Kong Jun (孔均), a 16th-generation descendant of Confucius.

Emperor Ming (r. 58–75 AD) awarded Kong Juan (孔損), an 18th-generation descendant of Confucius, the title "Marquis of Bao Village" (褒亭侯).

Emperor An (r. 106–125 AD) gave the title "Marquis of Fengsheng Village" (奉聖亭侯) to Kong Yao (孔曜), a 19th-generation descendant of Confucius.

The title of Duke of Song and "Duke Who Continues and Honours the Yin" (殷紹嘉公) were bestowed upon Kong An (孔安 (東漢) by the Eastern Han dynasty because he was part of the Shang dynasty's legacy. This branch of the Confucius family was a separate branch from the line that held the title of Marquis of Fengsheng village and later Duke Yansheng. This practice was referred to as 二王三恪.

=== Three Kingdoms period (220–280 AD) through Northern and Southern dynasties era (420–589) ===
During the Three Kingdoms period, the state of Cao Wei (220–265) renamed the title "Marquis Baocheng" (褒成侯) to "Marquis Zongsheng" (宗聖侯).

The Jin (266–420) and Liu Song (420–479) dynasties changed the title to "Marquis of Fengsheng Village" (奉聖亭侯).

The Northern Wei dynasty (386–535) changed the title to "Marquis Chongsheng" (崇聖侯) while the Northern Qi dynasty (550–577) called it "Marquis Gongsheng" (恭聖侯). Under the Northern Zhou dynasty (557–581), the title was promoted from a marquis title to a ducal title, "Duke of Zou" (鄒國公).

A fief of 100 households and the rank of 崇聖侯 Marquis who worships the sage was bestowed upon a Confucius descendant, Yan Hui's lineage had 2 of its scions and Confucius's lineage had 4 of its scions who had ranks bestowed on them in Shandong in 495 and a fief of ten households and rank of 崇聖大夫 Grandee who venerates the sage was bestowed on 孔乘 Kong Sheng who was Confucius's scion in the 28th generation in 472 by Emperor Xiaowen of Northern Wei.

=== Sui (581–618) and Tang (618–907) dynasties ===
In the Sui dynasty, Emperor Wen (r. 581–604) awarded the title "Duke of Zou" (鄒國公) to Confucius's descendants, but Emperor Yang (r. 604–618) downgraded and renamed the title to "Marquis Shaosheng" (紹聖侯).

During the early Tang dynasty, the title was renamed to "Marquis Baosheng" (褒聖侯). In the Kaiyuan era (713–741) of the reign of Emperor Xuanzong, the emperor posthumously honoured Confucius as "Prince Wenxuan" (文宣王) and promoted the "Marquis Baosheng" title to "Duke Wenxuan" (文宣公).

Duke Wenxuan Kong Renyu lived during the Later Tang dynasty.

A line in the Book of Rites had an interpretation written by Kong Yingda. Kong Yingda wrote some interpretations on the Record of Music. 禮記正義 was compiled by Kong Yingda. Kong Yingda wrote a new edition of the Shijing. Confucius' scion in the 32nd generation Kong Yingda wrote interpretations of the Confucian 5 Classics called the 五經正義 Wujing zhengyi. A description was written by Kong Yingda on the Di sacrifice. Zhaomu were also mentioned by Kong.

=== Northern and Southern Song dynasties (960–1279) ===
In 1055, Emperor Renzong, changed the "Duke Wenxuan" title to "Duke Yansheng" (衍聖公) to avoid naming taboo associated with the posthumous names of the earlier emperors. The title "Duke Yansheng" was then awarded to Kong Zongyuan (孔宗願), a 46th-generation descendant of Confucius. It was later changed to "Duke Fengsheng" (奉聖公) but was quickly restored back to "Duke Yansheng", and has since then been known as "Duke Yansheng".

Confucius' house was built over by the Confucius temple with things like the Apricot Altar remaining from his house where Confucius lectured disciples.

During the wars between the Song dynasty and Jurchen-led Jin dynasty (1115–1234), the Song capital, Kaifeng, was conquered by Jin forces in 1127. Remnants of the Song dynasty retreated south and established the Southern Song dynasty, with Emperor Gaozong (r. 1127–1162) as their ruler. Kong Duanyou (孔端友), who then held the Duke Yansheng title, also moved to the south and settled in Quzhou, Zhejiang, where the southern branch of Confucius's descendants was created. Kong Duancao (孔端操), Kong Duanyou's brother, remained in Qufu, Shandong, where he called himself the "acting Duke Yansheng". Later on, the Jin dynasty recognised Kong Duancao's legitimacy. This resulted in a north–south split among the descendants of Confucius. Historians regarded the southern branch as the di (legitimate) successor to Confucius's line, while the northern branch is seen as a shu (offshoot) branch.

The Kong family held their office and title for the most continuous and longest time out of all families in China's history. They were granted the title Duke Yansheng by the Song dynasty in 1055 and were symbolically and military important to the Song, Jin and Yuan dynasties in their wars over northern China as they symbolized Confucianism and served as military agents of those dynasties in the northern China region.

The Kongs in Qufu had a genealogy compiled during the Northern Song which described disciples with Confucius images. A pavilion was built by the Jin in the 1190s in the Confucius temple of Qufu over a Song dynasty era dais constructed in 1022. The dias built by the Song and modified by the Jin was depicted in the 1242 Kongshi zuting guangji genealogy written by Kong Yuancuo. The genealogy written by Kong Yuancuo contains Kong Chuan's Zuting Guangji (祖庭廣記) with Kong Gui (孔瓌)'s (scion in the 49th generation) introduction. Kongshi zuting guangji shows pictures of the Song and Jin dynasty era temple of Confucius.

Quzhou was where the Gaozong followers from the Kong family evacuated to.

The Quzhou temple is home to a rubbed Confucius portrait while the Qufu one has a tablet made out of stone with a rubbed portrait of Yan Hui and Confcuius while the Qufu temple has another Confucius icon.

Kong Qingjue (孔清覺) led a White Cloud (白雲宗) group.

In 1134 東家雜記 Dongjia zaji was written by Kong Chuan (孔傳).

In the temple in Qufu an image on a stele was set up by the scion in the 48th generation Kong Duanyou. The temple contained the small portrait of Yan Hui and Confucius as recorded by Kong Zonghan. A cadet branch scion in the 49th generation 孔瑀 Kong Yu in 118 patronized the construction of the portrait on a second stele.

孔宗壽 Kong Zong scio, a scion in the 46th generation in 1096 in the temple in Qufu installed a tablet depicting a portrait of 10 disciples with Confucius which Kong Zonghan mentioned. The portrait was included in the genealogy Kongshi zuting guangji of Kong Yuancuo. Another image was not redrawn by Kong Yuancuo by was mentioned by Kong Zongyuan, which showed all 72 disciples with Confucius.

In the Quzhou temple Kong Chuan and Kong Duanyou patronized the creation of a Confucius image.

46th generation descendant 孔宗翰 Kong Zonghan wrote in 1085 a new genealogy. Confucius portraits were spread around in Qufu by Confucius's scions. A genealogy was written in 1085 by Kong Zonghan which described disciples and Confucius images. The genealogy of Kong Yuancuo contained one of the images which also appeared in the temple in Qufu and according to Kong Chuan it was drawn by Qu Daozi.

孔氏祖庭廣記 Kongshi zuting guangji was compiled by 孔元措 Kong Yuancuo.

Kong Chuan's genealogy was succeeded in 1242 the publishing of the 1227 genealogy written by the Jin dynasty Duke Yansheng of the 51st generation 孔元措 Kong Yuancuo.

The Quzhou-based scion in the 53rd generation during the Yuan dynasty 孔濂 Kong Lian wrote commentary on a stele at Quzhou which said that Kong Chuan and his nephew Kong Duanyou created a stone carved image of Confucius.

=== Yuan dynasty (1271–1368) ===
From 1127 up to the Mongol-led Yuan dynasty, there were two Duke Yanshengs – one in Quzhou, Zhejiang (in the south) and the other in Qufu, Shandong (in the north). In 1233, Ögedei Khan (r. 1229–1241) granted the Duke Yansheng title to Kong Yuancuo (孔元措), a 51st-generation descendant of Confucius from the northern branch.

Kublai Khan (r. 1260–1294) originally wanted to merge the two Duke Yanshengs under the southern one by making Kong Zhu (孔洙), the southern branch's leader, the legitimate successor to the Duke Yansheng line. However, since Kong Zhu declined the offer, Kublai Khan abolished the southern Duke Yansheng title and appointed Kong Zhu as the jijiu (祭酒) of the Imperial Academy. Since then, the northern branch has remained as the "legitimate" heir to the Duke Yansheng line.

In 1307, shortly after his enthronement, Külüg Khan (r. 1307–1311) awarded the posthumous honorary title "Prince Dacheng Zhisheng Wenxuan" (大成至聖文宣王) to Confucius.

The Song gave him a Quzhou-based fief and manor where his descendants reigned in the Southern Song. Meanwhile, Kong Duanyou's younger brother Kong Duancao was appointed as duke Yansheng in 1128 by the Jin dynasty in Xianyuan back north. This resulted in a permanent division between north and southern lineages that lasted into the Qing and never was fixed over. The Yansheng Dukes gained more power in the Jin than their situation in the previous Song. In the 1140s the Jin reverted Qufu back to its original name from Xianyuan while the Duke Yansheng once again held the position of magistrate of Qufu. The position of Qufu magistrate was granted to Duke Yansheng Kong Yuancuo in 1197 after he became duke in 1191. The dual holding of both positions was granted to the dukes when they became 17 and was known as shixi (hereditary entitlement). The Jin needed the Kongs as vital allies as they faced the Mongol threat from the north and therefore conceded to them their hereditary control over the office of magistrate of Qufu and made it official and institutionalized. The Mongol war against the Jin led to the Kong lineage once again facing the possibility of dividing into even more factions. Kong Duanyou's descendants up to Kong Zhu in Quzhou continued to receive the Duke Yansheng title from the southern Song. The Southern Song invaded Shandong by moving north while the Jin itself was invaded by Mongols from the north. This led to the Duke Yansheng under the Jin, Kong Yuancuo to be dislocated from Qufu as his promotion in the jin government to higher and higher offices led him to relocated to what is now modern Beijing, then also the Jin capital. In 1214 after it fell to the Mongols. The Jin Xuanzong emperor evacuated toward Kaifeng, the Jin southern capital with Duke Kong Yuancuo. Kong Yuancuo's location with the Jin emperor as the Jin state fell apart across northern China led to a new third Duke arising in Qufu. Another member of the Kong family from a cadet branch, a son of Kong Fu named Kong Yuanyong carried out rituals in Qufu in the temple when Jin defense in Shandong fell leading to a successful invasion from the south of Shandong by Song armies in 1225. Kong Yuangong took control of the city as Song armies renamed Qufu back to Xianyuan and granted both the office of magistrate of Xianyuan and title of Duke Yansheng to Kong Yuanyong. Meanwhile, the Song also kept the titles of the Quzhou-based Duke Yansheng leading there to be two Duke Yanshengs under the Song, one in Quzhou and one in Qufu, showing that the southern branch at Quzhou was politically weak. There were three Duke Yansheng in China at the same time from Confucius's descendants, one in Qufu with the Kong temple, one in south China at Quzhou and one in Kaifeng with the Jin dynasty. Kong Yuancuo in Kaifang was descended from Kong Duancao, younger brother of Kong Duanyou, the ancestor of the south branch. It was Kong Yuanyong of the Qufu branch which had the military and political power. Kong Yuanyong became the Yanzhou prefect's administrative assistant and communications military commissioner as well as jizhou controller-general. His son Kong Zhiquan succeeded him to the magistracy and ducal title in 1226 when Kong Yuanyong went on a military campaign north with the Song armies. Kong Yuanyong and his branch's hold over the ducal title was by military power as the Song dynasty viewed them as vital military allies to control the region. Whoever could become duke in Qufu was determined by military force at this time.

The local warlords and the dynastic state armies were the allies who the Dukes sought out. Kong Zhiyuan was given ranks, titles and enfeoffment as duke in 1226 by the Mongols when they came to Qufu. But in 1233 Kong Zhiquan had to cede the title of Duke to Kong Yuancuo after he came back to Qufu once Kaifeng surrendered to the Mongols and Kong Yuancuo was let out. Yan Shi the Shandong warlord under the Yuan who had marriage ties to Kong Yuancuo, may have helped him get his ducal title in Qufu back. Kong Yuancuo wrote the family genealogy "Kong shi zuting guangji" (Expanded Record of the Ancestral Court of the Kong Clan) excluding the Quzhou-based southern branch, intended as a rebuttal to a Southern Song dynasty commissioned work about the southern branch. It backed Kong Yuancuo's claim to the ducal title and control over the county. The 75-year-old Kong Xi, a 50th generation descendant of Confucius was appointed as quan (proxy) duke to stand in place of Kong Yuancuo and carry out rituals while Kong Yuancuo was away from Qufu serving in the Mongol court where he was promoted to the top. The Kong Qufu administration became extremely complex as a result with power divided out. Renovations to carry out repairs to the temple and construction of a stele with an inscription by Kong Yuancuo over the renovation of Qufu's Contemplation Hall in 1245 recorded the appointment of Kong Xi as proxy duke. Kong Xi holding the title as proxy was also referred to in a 1239 inscription. While Kong Yuancuo was in the Mongol court serving in posts he wanted in Qufu to project an image of power by using the proxy. The use of a proxy Duke led to bureaucrats objections since the proxy duke just became a sinecure carrying out ancillary rituals. An election system to elect Dukes was proposed by Wang Yun (1227–1304) instead of using proxy dukes when the actual Duke was in the capital holding administrative positions. Kong Yuancuo could not suppress Kong Yuanyong's branch in Qufu entirely. Kong Zhiquan, the son of Kong Yuanyong still had the power to force Kong Yuancuo to let Kong Zhiquan hold the magistracy while he surrendered the title of Duke to Kong Yuancuo. He stayed as magistrate until the Mongols promoted him to be the local circuit's brigade commander in 1252. Kong Zhen, the son of Kong Zhigu, a nephew of Kong Yuancuo, succeeded Kong Yuancuo as Duke Yansheng in 1251. Meanwhile, Kong Zhiyuan's son Kong Zhi succeeded him as county magistrate of Qufu after he became military brigade commander. Opponents of Kong Zhen in 1258 pressured the Yuan court to remove the ducal title from Kong Zhen, leading Kong Yuanyong's branch under Kong Zhi to take full control of county administration and the temple. Kong Zhi was proxy for offering sacrifices as the temple and Qufu magistrate for three decades as the ducal title lay vacant when the Yuan court finally granted the Duke Yansheng title to Kong Zhi in 1295. The county administration, ducal title and northern Kong lineage fell under Kong Yuanyong's branch again. Non-Han rule led to the increase of power and political influence of Confucius's descendants, as the Mongols and Jurchens needed to support Confucianism and the Confucius family for political legitimacy. The war situation also led to a military character being acquired by the Kong Dukes.

Kong Ruogu (孔若古) aka Kong Chuan (孔傳) 47th generation was claimed to be the ancestor of the Southern branch after Kong Zhu died by Northern branch member Kong Guanghuang.

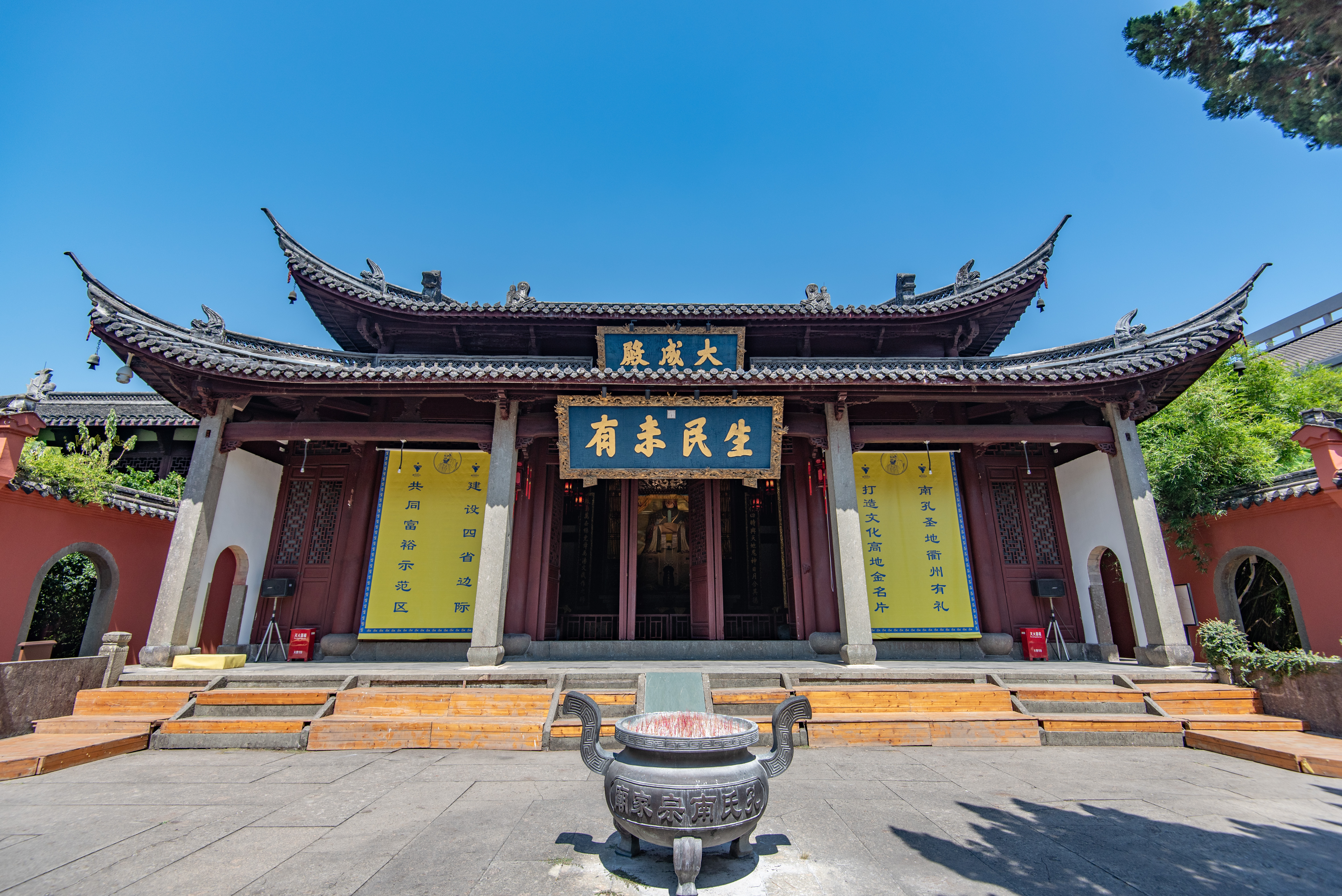
Mansion of South Branch of Kong family in Quzhou, Zhejiang

During the Yuan dynasty, one of Confucius' descendants, who claimed to be one of the Duke Yansheng Kong Huan (孔浣) 's sons, named Kong Shao (孔紹), moved from China to Goryeo era Korea and established a branch of the family there after wedding a Korean woman (Jo Jin-gyeong (曹晉慶)'s daughter) during Toghon Temür's rule. This branch of the family called the Gong clan of Qufu received aristocratic rank in Joseon era Korea.

The Liyang Kongs were descendants of Confucius who lived in southern China during the Yuan dynasty's final years. Kong Keqi (孔克齊) or Kong Qi (孔齊) was a scion of the 55th generation. An account was written by Kong Qi on this era.

The Kong became a reluctant part of the Ming after collaborating very closely with the Mongols in the 14th century. In Qufu, the dukedom and county magistracy become the two focal competing centers of power around which the various Kong parties coalesced around leading to Qufu seeing an end to the instability and the dukedom's power and character becoming clearly defined and lasting stably in that manner until the 1900s. The Duke Kong Sicheng from Kong Yuanyong's branch was removed and ousted by Kong Sihui in 1316 from another branch of the family and Kong Sihui successfully acquired enough power into the ducal office to make it permanently stay in his branch of the family so other rival Kong branches could not take it away. The Yuan court helped Kong Sihui in this. Kong Sicheng became magistrate of Qufu and Duek Yansheng in 1307 after inheriting it from his father Kong Zhi but this led to a Kong faction which opposed him to petition to emperor-khan with a genealogy asserting that Confucius's dizhang (mainline) descendant was Kong Sihui instead of Kong Sicheng. The Yuan emperor khan then removed the title from Kong Sicheng and gave it to Kong Sihui in 1316 after reviewing the genealogy he was presented and agreeing with it. Kong Sicheng and Kong Sihui were both from the branch of the Kong family descended from Kong Fu, who was descended from Kong Ruoyu according to the genealogy, the third son of the first Duke Yansheng Kong Zongyuan after Kong Ruomeng and the elected Duke Kong Ruoxu. Kong Sihui also started the story of the Five dynasties era usurpation by Kong Mo in his Queli zong zhi tu ji (record of the Diagram of the Queli Genealogy). The 1316 accession of Kong Sihui to the title Duke Yansheng led to the newest and final transfer of the Ducal title of the northern lineage to another branch so from the 1300s to 1900s all Dukes would be descended from Kong Sihui. However, in Qufu the position of county magistrate continued to be divided and not in the hands of the Duke as Kong Sicheng and his descendants would be Qufu county magistrates for the rest of the Yuan dynasty and the magistracy would henceforth be in the hands of other Kong were not the reigning Duke. Cao Yuanyong, a Yuan court official presented in Qufu for a sacrifice wrote an inscription in 1320 about the division between the ducal title and magistracy within the Kong family. The Mongol darugachi was also present in Qufu with the magistrate and Duke. The division of the magistracy from the dukedom institutionalized the power sharing arrangement between Kong Sicheng's branch and Kong Sihui's branch. Kong Sicheng was succeeded by his uncle Kong Ji who was his father Kong Zhi's younger brother then Kong Ji's son succeeded him in 1322, then in 1333, Kong Keqin, the son of kong Sicheng succeeded him then in 1352, Kong Xida, the son of Kong Keqin succeeded him then Kong Xizhang, the younger brother of Kong Xida succeeded him in 1363 and Kong Xida became magistrate again in 1368 upon the Ming conquest. The Hanlin Academy Historical Bureau editor Zhou Boqi mentioned the power sharing arrangement between Kong Sihui's branch which were Dukes and Kong Sicheng's branch which were county magistrates in 1340 in his "A Record of the Great Yuan Dynasty's Offerings in the Temple of the First Sage", praising the Yuan dynasty for enfeoffing the main branch as Duke and cadet branch as county magistrate.

The two factions in the Kong family and their power sharing deal lead to a branch of Kong magistrates with connections with the regional militaries and political power in Qufu and a branch of dukes with strong ties to the Yuan court. The different branches of the Kong family had physically different power centers in Qufu as well through the 1200s and 1300s. In 1350 Kong Keqin, the Qufu magistrate created a stele mentioning that under the Yuan dynasty the county administrative center shifted locations thrice, Kong Keqin's great-grandfather Kong Yuanyong ruled as magistrate in the beginning of the Yuan dynasty from his house then the magistrate shifted and operated out of the Sanhuang Miao (Three Emperors' Temple) and Kong Keqin constructed an administrative office to govern east of the Han dynasty Lu capital by several Li which was also toward the Song county capital's ruins west by one Li. The Ducal residence and temple at Queli was 9 Li away from this new capital, towards the east of Queli. 14th century China in the late Yuan was struck by social upheaval, disease and war. Thousands of peasants of non-Kong families worked in labor on the estates of the Kong lineage from which their power derived. Kongs in the Yuan dynasty had less economic wealth and power and less population than the Kong dukes of the Ming and Qing. Western Shandong experienced a drop in population due to the transition from the Mongol Yuan dynasty to the Ming dynasty and it shook Kong power in Qufu as well as caused the number of persons under one's control to be a barometer of power and wealth instead of amount of land owned. The Kong Dukes acquired economic power through gaining people and land personally, getting donations from private sources and imperial grants. "an imperial grant of five-thousand mu, in order to provide for the sacrificial objects, and a restoration of twenty-eight households, in order to serve as 'cleaners and sweepers.'" were recorded on a Kong Temple reconstruction inscription in 1301. The Kongs were also granted properties of criminals to be held as their hereditary property forever including households of slaves to farm lands, as after a criminal investigation a censor made a recommendation to the Yuan court in 1334. these slave households who lived in appropriate residences and farmed land for the Kongs paid rent to the Kongs and were called "cleaning and sweeping households". Wealthy notables and government officials donated xuetian (school fields) to academies that were attended by sons of the Kong family. The Kong were to be granted family slaves, 27 units of residences and 889 mu of land seized from criminals. Dozens of thousands were probably bound in hereditary service to the Kong Dukes in Qufu. The 14th century Yuan to Ming transition led to massive change in western Shandong's demographics causing agriculture and its relations to be reorganized as huge depopulation followed repeated disasters towards the north and west of the Grand Canal and in the flat plains of western Shandong. After dikes failed on the upstream Yellow river it shifted course changing its route from Xuzhou in the south towards north via the flat plains to exit into the Bohai Gulf in 1344. The plains were flooded until 1351 and many of its inhabitants had to leave to other places. Plague also spread all over northern China, Asia, and Europe in the 14th century's latter half.

War between the Yuan dynasty's armies and rebels as the Yuan dynasty fell and collapsed and Ming dynasty was built also led to more depopulation in addition to the plagues and famine. In 1333 Duke Kong Sihui was succeeded by his son Duke Kong Kejian who was loyal to the Yuan dynasty and fought for them until the Ming dynasty's first emperor Zhu Yuanzhang achieved victory over northern China and expelled the Mongols. He was born in 1316 and after he mourned for his father in 1340 he was granted the title of Duke. He was promoted by the Yuan to a second rank official and then in 1355 Dash Temur recommended him to become the high ranking tongzhi Taichang Liyi Yuan (Court of Imperial Observances associate administrator) in the Yuan government. He was then made into she Taichang Qing (Court of Imperial Sacrifices chief minister) some months after that meaning all state sacrificial ceremonies were under Kong Kejian's control. In 1355 Kong Xixue, his son succeeded him in Qufu as Duke as he resigned from the Dukedom since he could not do sacrifices in Qufu at the same time as his duties in the Yuan government. The Mongol elite broke down into factional conflict in the 1350s leading to the Yuan dynasty's control in China proper weakening and warlords and their armies emerging in rural China. In 1351 northern China started to get racked by the rebellions of the Red Turbans and in 1353 a new city wall was built and in 1358 a new local militia was mobilized by elites in Qufu as Yuan dynasty institutions collapsed. In 1355 or 1356 Kong Kejian and his relatives evacuated and fled to the Yuan capital Yan (Beijing) away from Qufu, and their Kong cemetery and temple. Kong Kejian was a military advisor to the Yuan dynasty court against rebels in the war over northern China. Kong Kejian advised the Yuan court to stay and fight for Beijing instead of abandoning it for Shaanxi's Guanzhong when the capital was attacked by the rebels in 1358. Kong Kejian told them to not abandon the grain and soil altars and instead fight and defeat the rebels. After the victory the Yuan dynasty appointed Kong Kejian to administer civil examinations as Minister of the Board of Ritual. Since many scholar-elites fled from the war and chaos of the provinces to the capital Kong Kejian said an exam should be held to recruit them. Kong Kejian participated in devising, orchestrating and planning military assaults against rebels who wanted to topple the Yuan dynasty. In 1361 Chaghan Temur and Duke Kong Kejian retook Qufu from the Dongping rebels enabling Kong Kejian and his family to return, after he and the shidafu (scholar-elite) had fled. They could resume sacrifices at the temple once they returned. The rebel takeover of Qufu had led to the influence of the factions of the Kong family which opposed Kong Kejian to be destroyed so factions in the Kong family could realign once the city was retaken. Kong Kejian decided to retire from administrative duties after returning to Qufu once Chaghan Temur retook it. The Yuan in 1362 offered to appoint Kong Kejian as Chancellor of the National University but it was refused by Kong Kejian as he and Kong Xixue, his son both went back to Qufu. This happened as Yuan rule was starting to collapse as Chaghan Temur was hit by more defections to the rebels across northern china as non-Mongol military leaders joined the rebellion. The Duke Yansheng's powers were constantly changing since it was started in the Song. Qufu county saw two rival power centers established by different branches of the Kong family in the late Yuan. The collapse of the Mongols led to uncertainty until the rise of the Ming when the dukedom was finally regularized.

=== Ming dynasty (1368–1644) ===
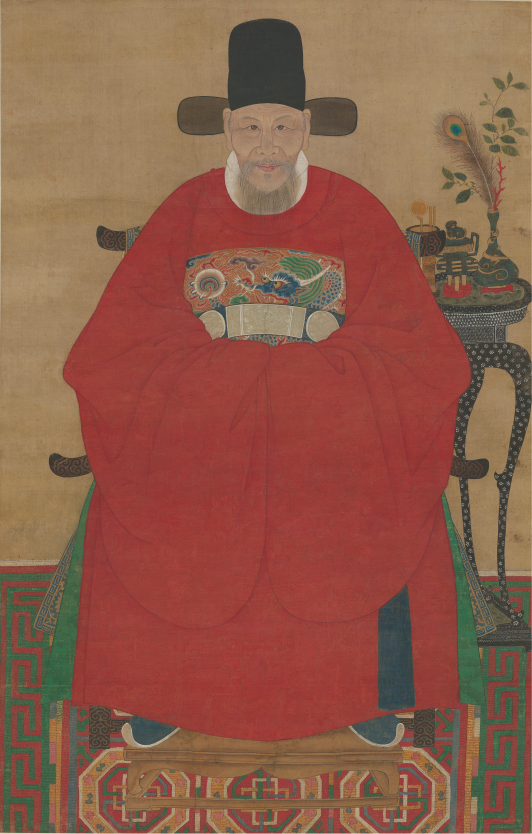
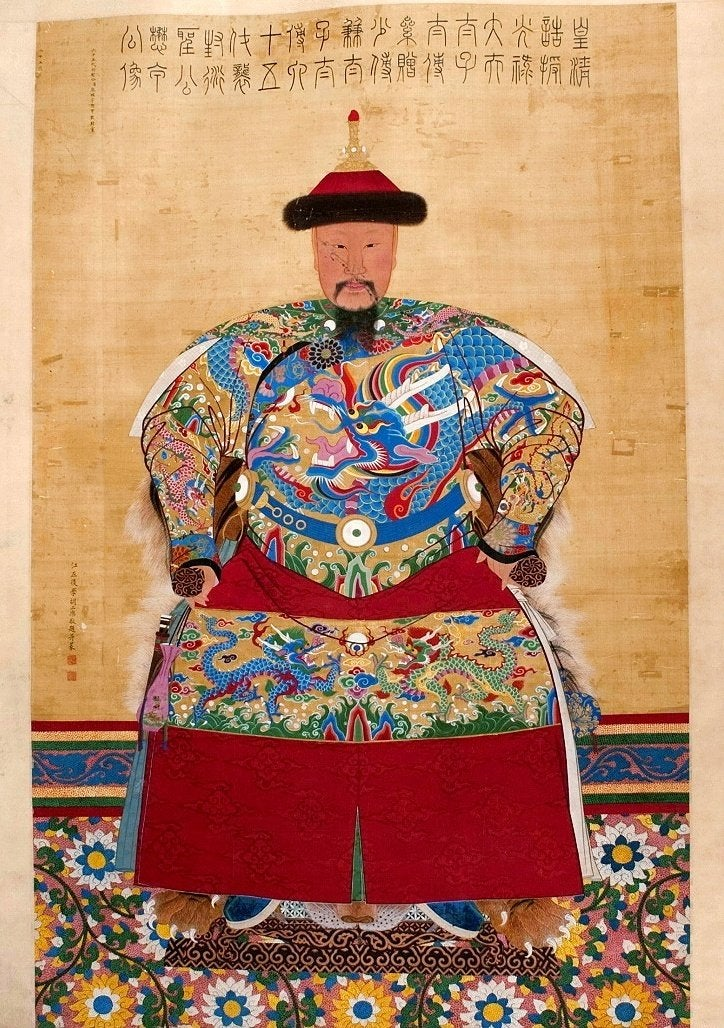
(top) Kong Shangxian (孔尚賢, 1544–1622), the penultimate Duke Yansheng during the Ming dynasty
(bottom) Kong Yinzhi (孔胤植, 1592–1648), the last Duke Yansheng in the Ming dynasty and the first in the Qing dynasty

The Yuan collapse and rise of the Ming dynasty under Zhu Yuanzhang, the peasant emperor led to a major expansion in the economic power of the Kong Dukes in Qufu. Their estate grew and they acquired more economic resources and land, despite the fact that the Ming clipped the political power of the Dukedom from what it had been under the Song, Jin and Yuan. The Ming banned the Dukes from simultaneously holding bureaucratic positions along with their Ducal title whereas the Song, Jin and Yuan had given administration positions as officials in the central court or region or military positions to the reigning Kong dukes. The Ming made sure culture and ritual were the only duties of the Duke. The power sharing arrangement between the magistrate and Duke in Qufu which began in the late Yuan was also fixed in the Ming and institutionalized. The economic power of the Kong Dukes under the Ming led them to be better able to do behind the scene manipulation in the Ming bureaucracy in the capital locally to gain political influence.

In 1506, the Zhengde Emperor (r. 1505–1521) appointed Kong Yansheng (孔彥繩), a member of the southern branch, as a "Wujing Boshi" (五經博士; "Professor of the Five Classics") in the Hanlin Academy. The appointment was equivalent to that of an eighth-grade official in the Ming imperial administration. Kong Yansheng's descendants were allowed to inherit the title "Wujing Boshi".

Kong Zhencong (孔貞叢) in 1552 and Kong Yinzhi (孔胤植), in 1609 edited the Queli zhi genealogy.

=== Qing dynasty (1644–1912) ===
On 31 October 1644, the Shunzhi Emperor (r. 1643–1661) of the Manchu-led Qing dynasty confirmed and recognised the legitimacies of the Duke Yansheng and Wujing Boshi titles after the Qing capital was established in Beijing following the Qing conquest of China proper.

Kong Luhua (relative of the Duke Yansheng) was the second wife of Ruan Yuan.

Headgear was worn by Kong Lingyi in an official portrait.

Despite corruption among Kong magistrates of Qufu during the Qing found during cases and controversy as to how to impeach and remove the corrupt magistrates, the case investigator Zhou Xuejian argued against the idea of removing Kongs from the position of magistrate of Qufu county saying it was not inappropriate since Qufu was Confucius's hometown and most of the residences and land of Qufu were owned by Kongs so there was nothing wrong with Kongs being governed by other Kongs. This was also a matter of respect for Confucius by the state and he also compared it to Manchu Eight Banner garrisons, which Manchus governed, just as Kongs governed other Kongs in Qufu. Zhou argued that how could the arrangement of Kongs being magistrate of Qufu be corrupt if Manchus governed Manchus in the Banner garrisons. Zhou Xuejian accepted the need for reform but objected to the idea of removing Kongs from the office of magistrate which Wei Tingpu had suggested. Zhou Xuejian said to fix the problem, Kongs from the southern branch who moved south in the 12th century with the Southern Song away from the Jin should be given the post of magistrate of Qufu, which ensured that they would not have conflicts of interest in Qufu since they were extra provincial outsiders with no local connections but they were still of the Kong family. The Grand Secretaries decided to reform the selection process for Qufu magistrates by leaving the magistracy in the position of the Kong family but keeping the Duke Yansheng out of the selection of the magistrates, making them send all the Shandong Kong families degree holders, students and exam takers to the provincial capital so an exam could be taken by them in front of the governor and the capital would receive the last two remaining candidates from the exam. This meant the magistrate would be less susceptible to corruption since the Duke would not appoint him and the governor would have to be careful since he had sole responsibility for appointing the candidates.

This led to the governor of Shandong's power over Qufu county's governance to be strengthened and the Duke's influence weakened. As the Qianlong emperor prepared for one of his tours and Shandong province engaged in preparations for it in 1755 a memorial concerning tax exempt and corvee exempt hereditary miaohu (temple households) was submitted by Duke Kong Zhaohuan. He complained that workers from outside the county needed to be hired by the magistrates since the hereditary temple households' services and money went directly into the purse of the Kong manor, into the Duke's treasury so these households could not be corveed or taxed by the county and the population of this tax-exempt population kept growing as population growth naturally went up. This meant a lack of workers for repairing infrastructure. Kong asked that all extra temple servants be transferred as regular subjects so they could pay corvee labour and taxes on the rolls and the temple and Kong manor would retain only fifty servant households who would remain exempt. This exposed the use of illegal forced labor from outside the county and also the Kong's tax evasion. Adult males were eligible to pay silver instead of labour so the silver could be by the state to hire actual workers to build projects so extracting labor instead of payment directly from taxpayers was illegal. The illegal labour levies by county local officials in their view should not have been brought to the emperor's knowledge since the emperor issued an edict condemning the practice and telling them to extract payments to fund projects instead of labor. He said the practice must end not just for temple servants but with everyone and set up a complete investigation into the practice. Acting governor of Shandong Bai Zhongshan noted that the illegal practice was motivated by the special circumstances Qufu county was in due to the massive amount of officially and legally labour exempt households Normal peasants only made up a third of Qufu's registered households and Qufu's isolated location made it hard to use board funds to buy fuel, food and materials for construction needed for the emperor's tour. The memorial of Kong Zhaohuan said that its aim was to help the Qufu magistrate gain more households to extract labour from but the Qianlong Emperor accused him of having the aim of gaining official status for his manor's dependent servant households' tax exemptions and since the memorial was submitted to the Board of Ritual the emperor was angry since Grand Secretary Chen Shiguan on the Board of Ritual was the grandfather of Chen Zhu, wife of Kong Zhaohuan. The emperor told the Duke to not interfere again or he and Chen Shiguan would have their titles removed. Zou county magistrate, a Han Chinese bannerman named Da Zhang fought with the Duke Kong Zhaohuan as reported by governor Bai to the emperor

Since the Kong Manor wanted to erect a stele that had no official approval that said Mencius's and Confucius's descendants in Zou county were tax exempt. The Duke was once again accused of public affairs interference, but the emperor decided to let the Duke off without removing his title even though the board suggested it, since the Duke was young and the manor was being managed by his grand uncle s Kong Jisu and Kong Jifen who were blamed for these mishappenings. These mishappenings did not involve the magistrate of Qufu yet at the same time they pointed to continued influence in the Qufu county's public administration by the Duke Yansheng so it was suggested in the light of the temple servant corve labor duties exemption, that the position of Qufu magistrate be removed from the Kong family and turned into a normal magistracy by appointment as suggested by Bai Zhongshan, governor of Shandong. Since the earlier 1741 reform did not reduce corruption in the Qufu magistracy the Board of Personnel concurred with Bai and the emperor complied. The last Kong magistrate Kong Chuansong was made hereditary official of the sixth rank and a new position to compensate him for the magistracy which was taken away from him. Then non-Kongs were appointed as magistrates of Qufu. The officials around Sahndong and Qufu had long struggled over economic and political power with the Duke Yansheng finally leading to the position of magistrate, where Kongs governed themselves to be taken away leaving the Kongs with the Dukedom.

The image and depictions of Confucius were part of the hegemonic aspect of the Kong dukes power that they relied on besides their economic and political power.

Incense, candles, firewood, silk, fruit, grain and livestock for sacrificial goods were required for the rituals repeatedly carried at the Confucius temple and family shrine where Kong ancestors had offerings made to them besides the sacrifices for the four seasons. There were also sacrifices for omens, event commemorations and to disciples of Confucius. Confucian ritual enacted in these constant sacrifices was supported by the Shandong ducal estates of the Kong family. Rehearsal and training were required for the personnel involved in dance and music in the sacrifices. Tax exemption was given to the dancer and music students for seasonal sacrifices and the Kong manor bureaucracy officials. In 1684 the Kangxi emperor went on a major imperial tour of Qufu which was recorded by Kong Shangren who was also a playwright and poet. The emperor's edict elaborated on the learning of the classics by the descendants of Confucius and the sacrifices and ritual patronized by the Manchu emperor as recorded by Kong Shangren in his "The Extraordinary Events Whereby I came Down from the Mountain". A legend arose that Qianlong frequently visited Qufu because the Kong Duke married one of Qianlong's daughters in secret since he made 8 imperial tours through Qufu on his way south throughout his reign. It was critical for Manchu emperors to visit Qufu's Confucius temple to gain the support of Han Chinese literati

The Kangxi emperor asked questioned and as answered by Kong Shangren as the emperor requested Kong to guide him through the Kong cemetery and temple. He visited the remains of the Walls of Lu, Apricot Terrace, Hall of the Great Ensemble, a hall that had engravings depicting Confucius's life events and the statue of Confucius in the temple. The emperor paid a visit to the tomb of Confucius past the Duke's manor's gate after exiting the temple and then they went to go to the cemetery out the city gate from the temple so that the commoners started prostrating before them. The cemetery to the north of Qufu was called Kong Lin since it was forested and large. Confucius's tomb was at the center of the cemetery. Kong descendants over dozens of generations were interred in the cemetery. The cemetery held great symbolic, collective and familial importance for members of the Kong family. There are more than 4,000 tombstones that can be identified in the cemetery in 183 hectares of forests under protection. It was illegal to cut down trees for wood or to pillage so a wall was built around the 3,000 mu cemetery in the late 17th century. The cemetery kept expanding to bury more and more Kong family members, located towards the Kong temple's north by over one kilometre with no other cemetery like it in historical scope or size in China. The Dukes were buried in the cemetery. The same Family Temple rituals were carried out at the cemetery three times a year at the tombs of the dukes as offerings were made. The vast history and size of the cemetery made it difficult to carry out rituals of giving ancestral offerings and maintaining graves.

There were a limited amount of ancestors venerated in the family temple but on the other hand, 70 generations of Kongs were buried in the cemetery meaning it was impossible to hold rites and rituals for everyone buried there. There were problems since some Kong nobles who held titles were buried outside of Qufu since they lived and died outside there, especially before the Song dynasty so there were no graves for them in Kong Lin. Some Kongs, and some of them Dukes had no direct descendants since they passed on their title to nephews, cousins or other relatives leading to uncertainty as to who should maintain their graves and clean them. And since in the 14th century Kong Sihui was given Kong Sicheng's title of Duke by the Yuan this implied that Kong Sichueng's father Kong Zhi wasn't a legitimate Duke and wrongly held the title so this brought the question if his grave should be given ducal treatment. In the 18th century, these questions concerning the cemetery were posed by Kong Jifen. He noted that actually nearly all pre-14th century graves before the generation of Kong Sihui had their locations lost in the historical record so only the 54th generation of Kong Sihui and their descendants and the first three generations of the Kong family, Confucius, Confucius's son Kong Li and Kong Li's son Kong Ji were venerated in tomb offerings. Late Imperial China's Board of ritual administered government academies, education and civil examinations. They took on special meanings near and in Qufu as special ritual places were chosen as the places to build education institutions and academies. Students could only be educated at one academy, Academy of the Four Clans run in the 17th century by the Kongs out of the five shuyuan (academies) in total run by them. They were foremost centers of ritual, where sacrifices would be carried out and li would be performed for the "first teacher" (Confucius).

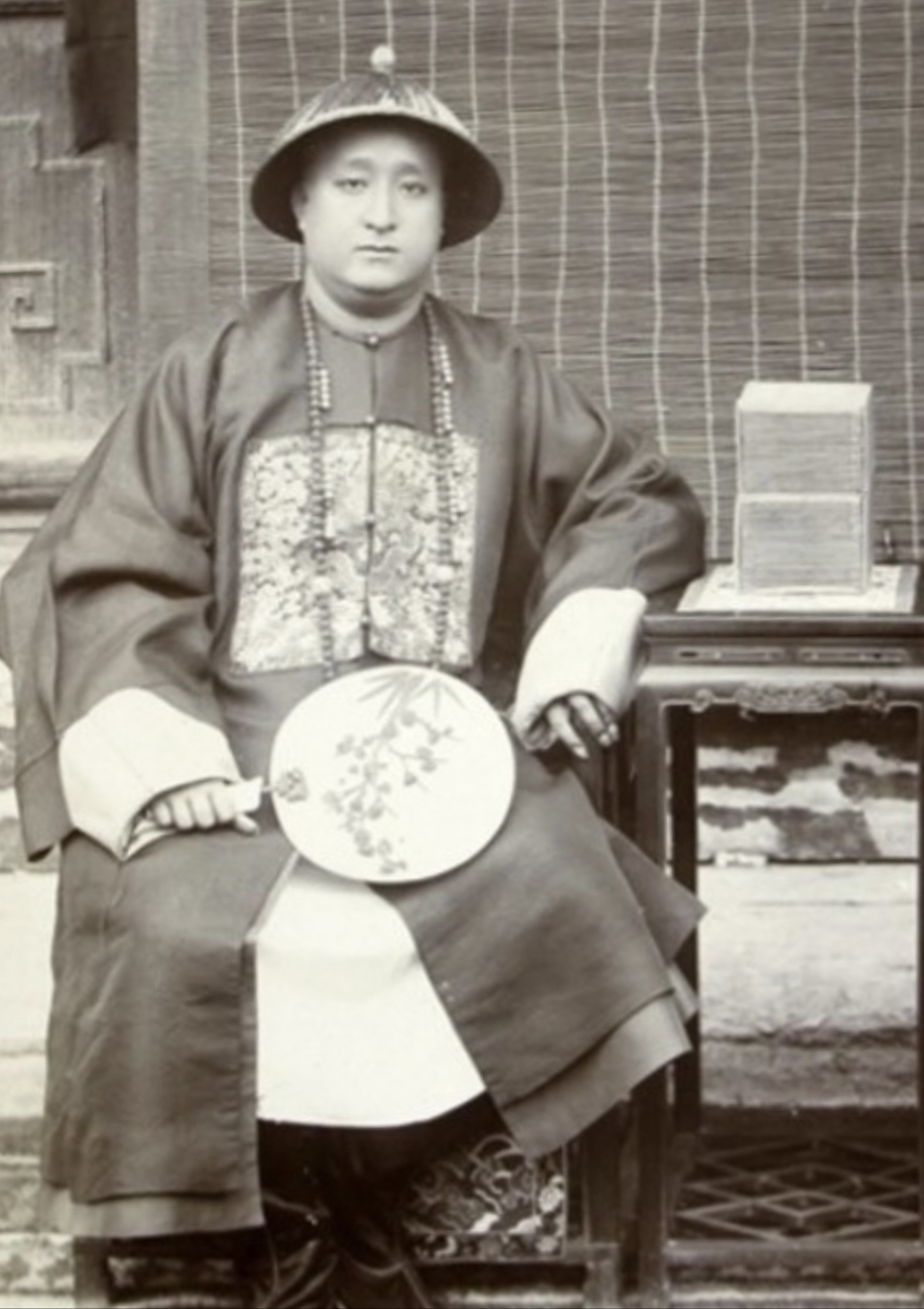
Kong Lingyi (孔令貽, 1872–1919) in 1904, the last Duke Yansheng in the Qing dynasty. After the 1911 Revolution, he retained the title during the time of the Beiyang government till his death.

Confucian academies served as a projection into rural areas of the power of the Kong Dukes. Sacred spaces and shrines, albeit already ruined before the 14th century, were chosen as the places to build the academies. Kong Sihui's branch seizing power as dukes in the late 13th and early 14th centuries lead to the renovation, expansion and rebuilding of the 4 academies. The 11th century Duke Kong Gonyuan's palace was built at the place of Confucius's birth at Mount Ni, close to Zou county towards Quifu's southwest where one of the academies and temples was rebuilt by Duke Kong Sihui in 1342. Tenants and land were endowed to the academy and they and their sacrifices would be managed by the shanzhang (headmaster) appointed by Kong Sihui. A student body was presented in this academy in the 14th century although the student body and educational aspects would go away later. At the Si river and Zhu rivers confluence another academy, the Zhu Si academy was built. It was built at the same time the Dukes gained power in the 14th century as the Mount Ni academy. This one was built on top of a Han dynasty Confucian school which was where the lecture hall of Confucius himself was located. And in the same 14th century Zou county's Zhongyong academy and Wenshang county's Shengze's academy were also built. The Duke Yansheng's power was buttressed and strengthened by rebuilding academies on top of ruins that had been constructed over a millennium earlier. What was known as the "Academy of the Four Clans of Kong, Yan Meng and Zeng" by the 18th century was founded earlier in Qufu to school the sons of the Kong family. They schooled people in helping the Duke Yansheng articulate Li and elite lineages political power was buttressed by these private academies. It was the 14th-century expansion in the political and economic power of the Kong Dukes that lead to the drastic expansion of the academy school dedicated to schooling the Kong families sons that existed since the 11th century since it was created by the Kong family.

=== Republic of China (1912–1949) ===
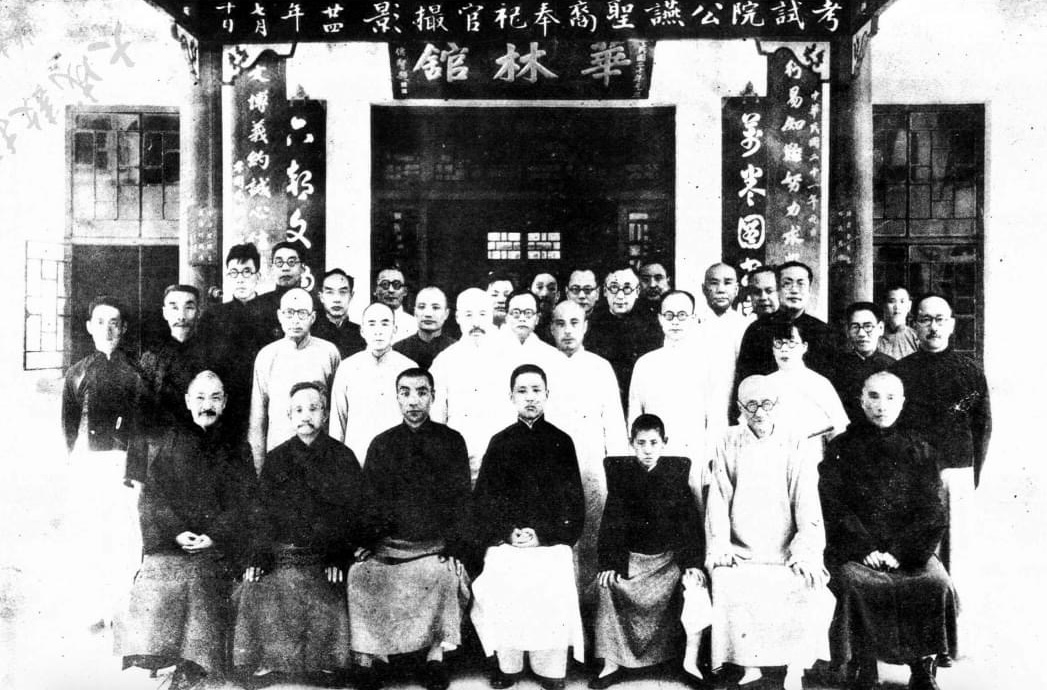
Ceremonial Official to Confucius and other scholars before Examination Yuan, Nanjing, 1935.

After the 1911 Xinhai Revolution which overthrew the Manchu-led Qing dynasty, most of the nobility titles used in the imperial era were abolished. The Duke Yansheng title, however, was an exception along with the Marquis of Extended Grace and the descendants of Mencius, Zengzi, and Yan Hui. During the revolution, some Westerners were told that a Han Chinese would be installed as the emperor. The candidate was either the bearer of the Duke Yansheng title, or the holder of the title "Marquis of Extended Grace", a title granted to descendants of the imperial family of the Ming dynasty. The Duke Yansheng was proposed for replacing the Qing dynasty as Emperor by Liang Qichao.

In 1913, the Beiyang government, led by Yuan Shikai, passed a law allowing the Duke Yansheng title to be retained and held by Kong Lingyi (孔令貽), a member of the northern branch. The Wujing Boshi title, on the other hand, was renamed to "Dacheng Zhisheng Xianshi Nanzong Fengsi Guan" (大成至聖先師南宗奉祀官) and held by Kong Qingyi (孔慶儀), a member of the southern branch.

Yuan Shikai conferred the title of Prince on the Duke immediately before declaring the Empire of China (1915–16).

The regent for the underage Duke Kong Te-cheng was Kong Lingjun 孔令儁. He was the Kong Family Mansion steward.

The Kuomintang government started defending Confucianism in the New Life Movement after the New Culture Movement and May Fourth Movement started attacking Confucianism which enabled the Kong family and Duke Yansheng to fend off critics.

In 1935, the Nationalist government abolished the hereditary peerage systems of the imperial era and converted the Duke Yansheng title into a political office, "Dacheng Zhisheng Xianshi Fengsi Guan" (大成至聖先師奉祀官), which simply means "Ceremonial Official to Confucius".

During the Second Sino-Japanese War (1937–1945), Kung Te-cheng (Kong Decheng), the Ceremonial Official to Confucius, evacuated to Hankou, Wuhan, where he was received by Kung Hsiang-hsi (Kong Xiangxi), a fellow descendant of Confucius. They moved to Chongqing later, where the Nationalist government was based during the war.

=== Taiwan (1949–present) ===
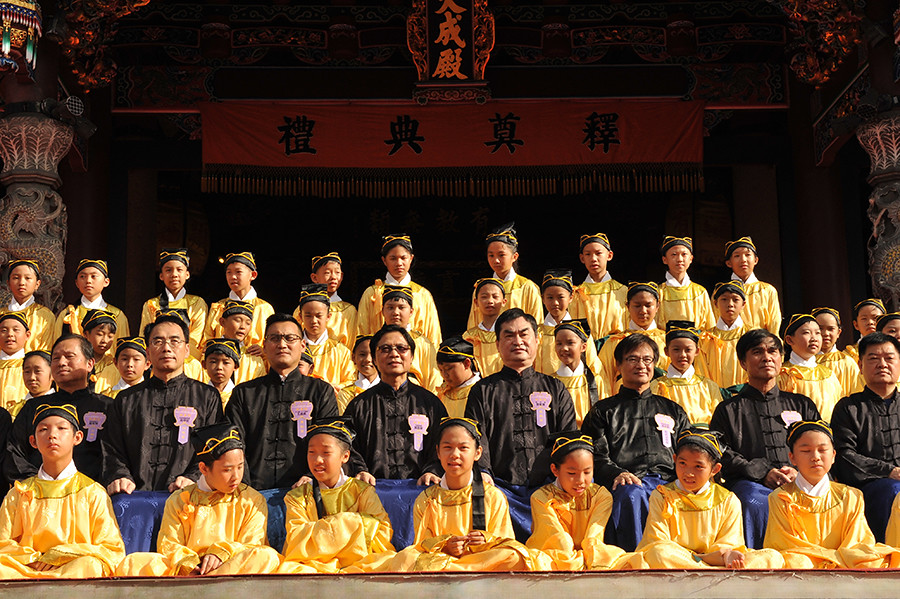
The Shidian Ritual held in Confucius Temple in Taipei, 2016, with the 2nd Ceremonial Official to Confucius, Kung Tsui-chang, as one of the main officials in the ritual

After the victory of the Communists in the Chinese Civil War, Kung Te-cheng evacuated with the Republic of China government to Taiwan where the current Ceremonial Official to Confucius is based. Until 2008, the office of "Ceremonial Official to Confucius" had the same ranking and remuneration as that of a cabinet minister in the government of the Republic of China in Taiwan. On the other hand, Yan Shiyung (顏世鏞, the last Ceremonial Official to Yan Hui, 1903–1975) and Kung Xiangkai (孔祥楷, the last Dacheng Zhisheng Xianshi Nanzong Fengsi Guan, 1938–2021) did not move to Taiwan, so their title was abolished after the establishment of People's Republic of China.

In 1998, the Taiwanese government demolished the office building of the ceremonial official but retained the appointment. The hostel of National Chung Hsing University along Guoguang Road in South District, Taichung is situated at the former location of the office building.

In 2008, with approval from the Kong family, Taiwan's Ministry of the Interior converted the ceremonial official appointment into an unpaid one. The office is currently held by Kung Tsui-chang (Kong Chuichang), a 79th-generation descendant of Confucius who was appointed in September 2009 after the death of his grandfather, Kung Te-cheng. The Ministry of Interior also declared that female descendants of Confucius are eligible for future appointment.

The southern branch still remained in Quzhou where they lived to this day, and the title of Confucius's descendants in Quzhou alone number 30,000. The leader of the southern branch is 孔祥楷 (Kong Xiangkai), a 75th-generation descendant of Confucius. He is the Southern Confucius Ancestral Temple's management committee director in Quzhou.

Traditionally, the descendants of Confucius use generation poems for their names given to them by the Ming and Qing Emperors along with the descendants of the other Four Sages 四氏. However, Yan family, one of the Four Sages and descendants of Yanyuan, did not use the poem eventually because Yanyuan is considered to be a possible maternal cousin of Confucius, so Emperor Yingzong of Ming made another generation poem for Yan family.

Traditional Ming dynasty Hanfu robes given by the Ming Emperors to the Chinese noble Dukes Yansheng descended from Confucius are still preserved in the Confucius Mansion after over five centuries. Robes from the Qing emperors are also preserved there. The Jurchens in the Jin dynasty and Mongols in the Yuan dynasty continued to patronize and support the Confucian Duke Yansheng.

There was a protest by Kong family members in Qufu against the construction of a Protestant church due to Qufu's status as their hometown.

The cooks of the descendants of Confucius, the Duke Yansheng created dishes that are part of aristocratic cuisine in China and were also served to the emperors. The descendants of Confucius who lived at the mansion and held the hereditary titles held feasts with a unique cuisine. One dish served by cooks of the Duke Yansheng in Qufu was called "Eight Immortals Crossing the Sea". Confucius's descendants had a 2,000 year old food culture which was unique among the Chinese aristocracy. The archives of the Duke Yansheng record the foods served at the various feasts and banquets at the Confucius mansion where many officials, international scholars and the emperor himself visited.

== List ==
No.	Generation	Name (Birth–Death)	Tenure Duration in years and days		Head of state
Duke Yansheng
1	46th	Kong Zongyuan 孔宗願	1055	1067?	Emperor Renzong of Song; Emperor Yingzong of Song
1	46th	Kong Zongyuan 孔宗願	12 years		Emperor Renzong of Song; Emperor Yingzong of Song
	47th	Kong Ruomeng 孔若蒙	1068	1098	Emperor Shenzong of Song; Emperor Zhezong of Song
	47th	Kong Ruomeng 孔若蒙	30 years		Emperor Shenzong of Song; Emperor Zhezong of Song
	47th	Kong Ruoxu 孔若虛 (?–1104)	1098	1104	Emperor Zhezong of Song; Emperor Huizong of Song
	47th	Kong Ruoxu 孔若虛 (?–1104)	6 years		Emperor Zhezong of Song; Emperor Huizong of Song
2	48th	Kong Duanyou 孔端友 (1078–1132)	1104	1132	Emperor Huizong of Song; Emperor Qinzong of Song; Emperor Gaozong of Song
2	48th	Kong Duanyou 孔端友 (1078–1132)	28 years		Emperor Huizong of Song; Emperor Qinzong of Song; Emperor Gaozong of Song
3 (south)	49th	Kong Jie 孔玠 (1122–1154)	1132	1154	Emperor Gaozong of Song
3 (south)	49th	Kong Jie 孔玠 (1122–1154)	22 years		Emperor Gaozong of Song
4 (south)	50th	Kong Jin 孔搢 (1145–1193)	1154	1193	Emperor Gaozong of Song; Emperor Xiaozong of Song; Emperor Guangzong of Song
4 (south)	50th	Kong Jin 孔搢 (1145–1193)	39 years		Emperor Gaozong of Song; Emperor Xiaozong of Song; Emperor Guangzong of Song
5 (south)	51st	Kong Wenyuan 孔文遠 (1185–1226)	1193	1226	Emperor Guangzong of Song; Emperor Ningzong of Song; Emperor Lizong of Song
5 (south)	51st	Kong Wenyuan 孔文遠 (1185–1226)	33 years		Emperor Guangzong of Song; Emperor Ningzong of Song; Emperor Lizong of Song
6 (south)	52nd	Kong Wanchun 孔萬春 (1207–1241)	1226	1241	Emperor Lizong of Song
6 (south)	52nd	Kong Wanchun 孔萬春 (1207–1241)	15 years		Emperor Lizong of Song
7 (south)	53rd	Kong Zhu 孔洙 (1228–1287)	1241	1276	Emperor Lizong of Song; Emperor Duzong of Song; Emperor Gong of Song
7 (south)	53rd	Kong Zhu 孔洙 (1228–1287)	41 years		Emperor Lizong of Song; Emperor Duzong of Song; Emperor Gong of Song
3 (north)	49th	Kong Fan 孔璠 (1106–1143)	1140	1143	Emperor Xizong of Jin
3 (north)	49th	Kong Fan 孔璠 (1106–1143)	3 years		Emperor Xizong of Jin
4 (north)	50th	Kong Zheng 孔拯 (1136–1161)	1142	1161	Emperor Xizong of Jin; Wanyan Liang of Jin; Emperor Shizong of Jin
4 (north)	50th	Kong Zheng 孔拯 (1136–1161)	19 years		Emperor Xizong of Jin; Wanyan Liang of Jin; Emperor Shizong of Jin
5 (north)	50th	Kong Cong 孔摠 (1138–1190)	1163	1190	Emperor Shizong of Jin; Emperor Zhangzong of Jin
5 (north)	50th	Kong Cong 孔摠 (1138–1190)	27 years		Emperor Shizong of Jin; Emperor Zhangzong of Jin
6 (north)	51st	Kong Yuancuo 孔元措 (1182–1251)	1191	1251	Emperor Zhangzong of Jin; Wanyan Yongji of Jin; Emperor Xuanzong of Jin; Emperor Aizong of Jin; Ögedei Khan; Güyük Khan
6 (north)	51st	Kong Yuancuo 孔元措 (1182–1251)	60 years		Emperor Zhangzong of Jin; Wanyan Yongji of Jin; Emperor Xuanzong of Jin; Emperor Aizong of Jin; Ögedei Khan; Güyük Khan
7 (north)	53rd	Kong Zhen 孔湞	1251	1253	Möngke Khan
7 (north)	53rd	Kong Zhen 孔湞	2 years		Möngke Khan
8	53rd	Kong Zhi 孔治 (1236–1308)	1295	1308	Chengzong of Yuan; Wuzong of Yuan
8	53rd	Kong Zhi 孔治 (1236–1308)	13 years		Chengzong of Yuan; Wuzong of Yuan
9	54th	Kong Sicheng 孔思誠	1308	1316	Wuzong of Yuan; Renzong of Yuan
9	54th	Kong Sicheng 孔思誠	8 years		Wuzong of Yuan; Renzong of Yuan
10	54th	Kong Sihui 孔思晦 (1267–1333)	1316	8 April 1333	Renzong of Yuan; Yingzong of Yuan; Taiding Emperor of Yuan; Tianshun Emperor of Yuan; Wenzong of Yuan; Mingzong of Yuan; Ningzong of Yuan; Emperor Shun of Yuan
10	54th	Kong Sihui 孔思晦 (1267–1333)	17 years		Renzong of Yuan; Yingzong of Yuan; Taiding Emperor of Yuan; Tianshun Emperor of Yuan; Wenzong of Yuan; Mingzong of Yuan; Ningzong of Yuan; Emperor Shun of Yuan
11	55th	Kong Kejian 孔克堅 (1316–1370)	1340	1355	Emperor Shun of Yuan
11	55th	Kong Kejian 孔克堅 (1316–1370)	15 years		Emperor Shun of Yuan
12	56th	Kong Xixue 孔希學 (1335–1381)	1355	7 October 1381	Emperor Shun of Yuan; Hongwu Emperor
12	56th	Kong Xixue 孔希學 (1335–1381)	26 years		Emperor Shun of Yuan; Hongwu Emperor
13	57th	Kong Ne 孔訥 (1358–1400)	1384	3 October 1400	Hongwu Emperor; Jianwen Emperor
13	57th	Kong Ne 孔訥 (1358–1400)	16 years		Hongwu Emperor; Jianwen Emperor
14	58th	Kong Gongjian 孔公鑑 (1380–1402)	1400	6 May 1402	Jianwen Emperor
14	58th	Kong Gongjian 孔公鑑 (1380–1402)	2 years		Jianwen Emperor
15	59th	Kong Yanjin 孔彥縉 (1401–1455)	1410	30 November 1455	Yongle Emperor; Hongxi Emperor; Xuande Emperor; Zhengtong Emperor; Jingtai Emperor
15	59th	Kong Yanjin 孔彥縉 (1401–1455)	45 years		Yongle Emperor; Hongxi Emperor; Xuande Emperor; Zhengtong Emperor; Jingtai Emperor
15	60th	Kong Chengqing 孔承慶 (1420–1450)	Title bestowed posthumously		
16	61st	Kong Hongxu 孔弘緒 (1448–1504)	1456	1469	Jingtai Emperor; Tianshun Emperor; Chenghua Emperor
16	61st	Kong Hongxu 孔弘緒 (1448–1504)	13 years		Jingtai Emperor; Tianshun Emperor; Chenghua Emperor
17	61st	Kong Hongtai 孔弘泰 (1450–1503)	1476	9 June 1503	Chenghua Emperor; Hongzhi Emperor
17	61st	Kong Hongtai 孔弘泰 (1450–1503)	27 years		Chenghua Emperor; Hongzhi Emperor
18	62nd	Kong Wenshao 孔聞韶 (1482–1546)	1503	12 March 1546	Hongzhi Emperor; Zhengde Emperor; Jiajing Emperor
18	62nd	Kong Wenshao 孔聞韶 (1482–1546)	43 years		Hongzhi Emperor; Zhengde Emperor; Jiajing Emperor
19	63rd	Kong Zhengan 孔貞幹 (1519–1556)	1546	9 September 1556	Jiajing Emperor
19	63rd	Kong Zhengan 孔貞幹 (1519–1556)	10 years		Jiajing Emperor
20	64th	Kong Shangxian 孔尚賢 (1544–1622)	1559	26 January 1622	Jiajing Emperor; Longqing Emperor; Wanli Emperor; Taichang Emperor; Tianqi Emperor
20	64th	Kong Shangxian 孔尚賢 (1544–1622)	63 years		Jiajing Emperor; Longqing Emperor; Wanli Emperor; Taichang Emperor; Tianqi Emperor
21	65th	Kong Yinzhi 孔胤植 (1592–1648)	1622	9 January 1648	Tianqi Emperor; Chongzhen Emperor; Shunzhi Emperor
21	65th	Kong Yinzhi 孔胤植 (1592–1648)	26 years		Tianqi Emperor; Chongzhen Emperor; Shunzhi Emperor
22	66th	Kong Xingxie 孔興燮 (1636–1668)	1648	7 January 1668	Shunzhi Emperor; Kangxi Emperor
22	66th	Kong Xingxie 孔興燮 (1636–1668)	19 years		Shunzhi Emperor; Kangxi Emperor
23	67th	Kong Yuqi 孔毓圻 (1657–1723)	1 March 1668	8 December 1723	Kangxi Emperor; Yongzheng Emperor
23	67th	Kong Yuqi 孔毓圻 (1657–1723)	55 years, 282 days		Kangxi Emperor; Yongzheng Emperor
24	68th	Kong Chuanduo 孔傳鐸 (1674–1735)	1723	1731	Yongzheng Emperor
24	68th	Kong Chuanduo 孔傳鐸 (1674–1735)	8 years		Yongzheng Emperor
25	69th	Kong Jihuo 孔繼濩 (1697–1719)	Title bestowed posthumously		
25	70th	Kong Guangqi 孔廣棨 (1713–1743)	1731	31 January 1743	Yongzheng Emperor; Qianlong Emperor
25	70th	Kong Guangqi 孔廣棨 (1713–1743)	12 years		Yongzheng Emperor; Qianlong Emperor
26	71st	Kong Zhaohuan 孔昭煥 (1735–1782)	1743	4 October 1782	Qianlong Emperor
26	71st	Kong Zhaohuan 孔昭煥 (1735–1782)	39 years		Qianlong Emperor
27	72nd	Kong Xianpei 孔憲培 (1756–1793)	29 October 1782	7 December 1793	Qianlong Emperor
27	72nd	Kong Xianpei 孔憲培 (1756–1793)	11 years, 39 days		Qianlong Emperor
28	73rd	Kong Qingrong 孔慶鎔 (1787–1841)	1794	22 March 1841	Qianlong Emperor; Jiaqing Emperor; Daoguang Emperor
28	73rd	Kong Qingrong 孔慶鎔 (1787–1841)	47 years		Qianlong Emperor; Jiaqing Emperor; Daoguang Emperor
29	74th	Kong Fanhao 孔繁灝 (1806–1862)	1841	11 November 1862	Daoguang Emperor; Xianfeng Emperor; Tongzhi Emperor
29	74th	Kong Fanhao 孔繁灝 (1806–1862)	21 years		Daoguang Emperor; Xianfeng Emperor; Tongzhi Emperor
30	75th	Kong Xiangke 孔祥珂 (1848–1876)	1863	14 November 1876	Tongzhi Emperor; Guangxu Emperor
30	75th	Kong Xiangke 孔祥珂 (1848–1876)	13 years		Tongzhi Emperor; Guangxu Emperor
31	76th	Kong Lingyi 孔令貽 (1872–1919)	1877	8 November 1919	Guangxu Emperor; Xuantong Emperor; Sun Yat-sen; Yuan Shikai; Li Yuanhong; Xu Shichang
31	76th	Kong Lingyi 孔令貽 (1872–1919)	42 years		Guangxu Emperor; Xuantong Emperor; Sun Yat-sen; Yuan Shikai; Li Yuanhong; Xu Shichang
32	77th	Kong Teh-cheng 孔德成; Kǒng Déchéng (1920–2008)	6 June 1920	8 July 1935	Xu Shichang; Li Yuanhong; Cao Kun; Duan Qirui; Zhang Zuolin; Tan Yankai; Chiang Kai-shek; Lin Sen
32	77th	Kong Teh-cheng 孔德成; Kǒng Déchéng (1920–2008)	15 years, 32 days		Xu Shichang; Li Yuanhong; Cao Kun; Duan Qirui; Zhang Zuolin; Tan Yankai; Chiang Kai-shek; Lin Sen
Ceremonial Official to Confucius
1	77th	Kong Teh-cheng 孔德成; Kǒng Déchéng (1920–2008)	8 July 1935	28 October 2008	Lin Sen; Chiang Kai-shek; Yen Chia-kan; Chiang Ching-kuo; Lee Teng-hui; Chen Shui-bian; Ma Ying-jeou
1	77th	Kong Teh-cheng 孔德成; Kǒng Déchéng (1920–2008)	73 years, 112 days		Lin Sen; Chiang Kai-shek; Yen Chia-kan; Chiang Ching-kuo; Lee Teng-hui; Chen Shui-bian; Ma Ying-jeou
-	78th	Kong Wei-yi 孔維益 (1939–1989)	Died young		
2	79th	Kong Tsui-chang 孔垂長; Kǒng Chuícháng (1975– )	25 September 2009	Incumbent	Ma Ying-jeou; Tsai Ing-wen; Lai Ching-te
2	79th	Kong Tsui-chang 孔垂長; Kǒng Chuícháng (1975– )	17 years, 57 days		Ma Ying-jeou; Tsai Ing-wen; Lai Ching-te

== See also ==
- Family tree of Confucius in the main line of descent
- Song (state) - Confucius was traditionally believed to be descended from the Shang dynasty Kings through the Dukes of Song
- Shang dynasty
- Descent from antiquity
- Other holders of the title Wujing Boshi
- Marquis of Extended Grace - Ming dynasty descendants
