= China General Chamber of Commerce-U.S.A. =

U.S.-based chamber of commerce

China General Chamber of Commerce-USA
- Abbreviation: CGCC-USA
- Formation: 2005
- Tax ID no.: 42-1682183
- Legal status: Not-for-profit organisation
- Headquarters: New York, NY
- Location: 1185 6th Ave, 14th Fl, Suite 1420, New York, NY 10036
- Chairman: Jianyu Zhang, CEO of Industrial and Commercial Bank of China, U.S. region
- Website: www.cgccusa.org

China General Chamber of Commerce - USA (CGCC; Chinese: 美国中国总商会; pinyin: Měiguó zhōngguó zǒng shānghuì) is a U.S.-based chamber of commerce focused on the U.S. and Chinese business communities. It was founded in 2005 and regularly engages with political and business leaders in the U.S. and the People's Republic of China (PRC).

CGCC, along with 600 other prominent U.S. organizations, including the Committee of 100 (C100), were described by a Newsweek article as part of the Chinese Communist Party's united front system of influence. CGCC denied any linkage.

== Programming ==
CGCC hosts and co-hosts programs and event series that aim to provide a platform for U.S. and Chinese business leaders, state governors, corporate executives, policy makers and other stakeholders to exchange viewpoints on substantial issues in U.S.-China economic relations.

Past programs also include the U.S. - China Governors Collaboration Summit, co-hosted with the National Governors Association (NGA), International Finance and Cooperation Forum, co-hosted with Bloomberg L.P., and the HSBC China Forum, co-hosted with HSBC.

In addition to seminars, forums and networking events for member companies, CGCC also offers research and information on Chinese investment in America through its flagship publication of its Annual Business Survey Report on Chinese Enterprises in the U.S. and maintenance of its U.S.- China Investment & Cooperation Database.

== CGCC Foundation ==
The CGCC Foundation is an IRS 501(c)(3) charitable organization affiliated with CGCC that was established in 2014. It aims to deepen mutual understanding and cooperation between the United States and China through research, public charity and engagement in economic, cultural and social exchanges.

== See also ==
- US China Business Council
- American Chamber of Commerce in the People's Republic of China
- Committee of 100
- Asia Society
- China Institute
