= Kong Zhaoshou =

Chinese educator (1876–1929)

- 孔昭绶

President of Hunan First Normal University
- In office April 1913 – January 1914
- Preceded by: Zeng Peilin (曾沛霖)
- Succeeded by: Zhu Zhenhuang (朱振黄)
- In office September 1916 – September 1918
- Preceded by: Peng Zhengshu (彭政枢)
- Succeeded by: Wen Huidian (文徽典)

Personal details
- Born: 1876 Liuyang, Hunan, Qing Empire
- Died: 1929 (aged 52–53) Nanjing, Jiangsu, Republic of China
- Children: 4
- Education: Hunan Youji Normal College; Hosei University
- Occupation: Educator

Kong Zhaoshou (simplified Chinese: 孔昭绶; traditional Chinese: 孔昭綬; pinyin: Kǒng Zhāoshòu; 1876–1929), a direct male-line 71st generation descendant of Confucius, was a Chinese educator who twice served as President of Hunan First Normal University from April 1913 to January 1914, and September 1916 to September 1918. His students included Mao Zedong, Cai Hesen, Xiao Zisheng, Xiao San, He Shuheng, Li Weihan, and Li Lisan.

== Names ==
His style name was Mingquan (明权), and his art name was Jingcheng (竟成) and Jingju (劲榉), his pen name was Rangyi (攘夷).

== Biography ==
Kong was born and raised in Dahu Town of Liuyang, Hunan. He graduated from Hunan Youji Normal College in 1910. In April 1913, he served as President of Hunan First Normal University, he was persecuted by Yuan Shikai for his criticism of Empire of China (1915–1916). In January 1914, Tang Xiangming, a naval officer supporter of Yuan Shikai, sent his soldiers to arrest Kong, but he escaped to Japan and studied at Hosei University. In 1916, after the death of Yuan Shikai, Tan Yankai succeeded Tang Xiangming to become Governor of Hunan, he invited Kong to serve as President of Hunan First Normal University. In November 1917, Fu Liangzuo, a naval officer supporter of Duan Qirui, with his army attacked Changsha, but soon they were run off the land by Kong and his students. In 1922, Kong became Vice Parliamentary Leader of Hunan Provincial Council. He died of illness at Kangji Hospital of Nanjing in 1929.

== Personal life ==
Kong and his wife (her surname was Tang 汤) had two sons and two daughters.

- Son: Kong Bolin (孔柏林)
- Son: Kong Quanlin (孔权麒).

Educational offices
Preceded by Zeng Peilin (曾沛霖)	President of Hunan First Normal University; 1913–1914	Succeeded by Zhu Zhenhuang (朱振黄)
Preceded by Peng Zhengshu (彭政枢)	President of Hunan First Normal University; 1916–1918	Succeeded by Wen Huidian (文徽典)
