= Lingshan =

Lingshan may refer to:

== Settlements in the People's Republic of China ==
County (灵山县)

- Lingshan County, Qinzhou, Guangxi

Subdistricts (灵山街道)

- Lingshan Subdistrict, Qi County, Hebi
- Lingshan Subdistrict, Anshan, in Lishan District, Anshan, Liaoning

Towns (灵山镇)

- Lingshan, Rong County, Guangxi, in Rong County, Guangxi
- Lingshan, Hainan
- Lingshan, Hebei
- Lingshan, Luoshan County
- Lingshan, Shandong, in Jimo City

Township (灵山乡)

- Lingshan Township, Wangkui County, Heilongjiang

Village (灵山村)

- Lingshan, Meichuan, Wuxue, Huanggang, Hubei

== Places ==
- Lingshan Islamic Cemetery

== Others ==
- Soul Mountain (靈山/灵山), a 1989 novel by Nobel-prize winner Gao Xingjian
