= Temple and Cemetery of Confucius and the Kong Family Mansion in Qufu =

UNESCO World Heritage Site
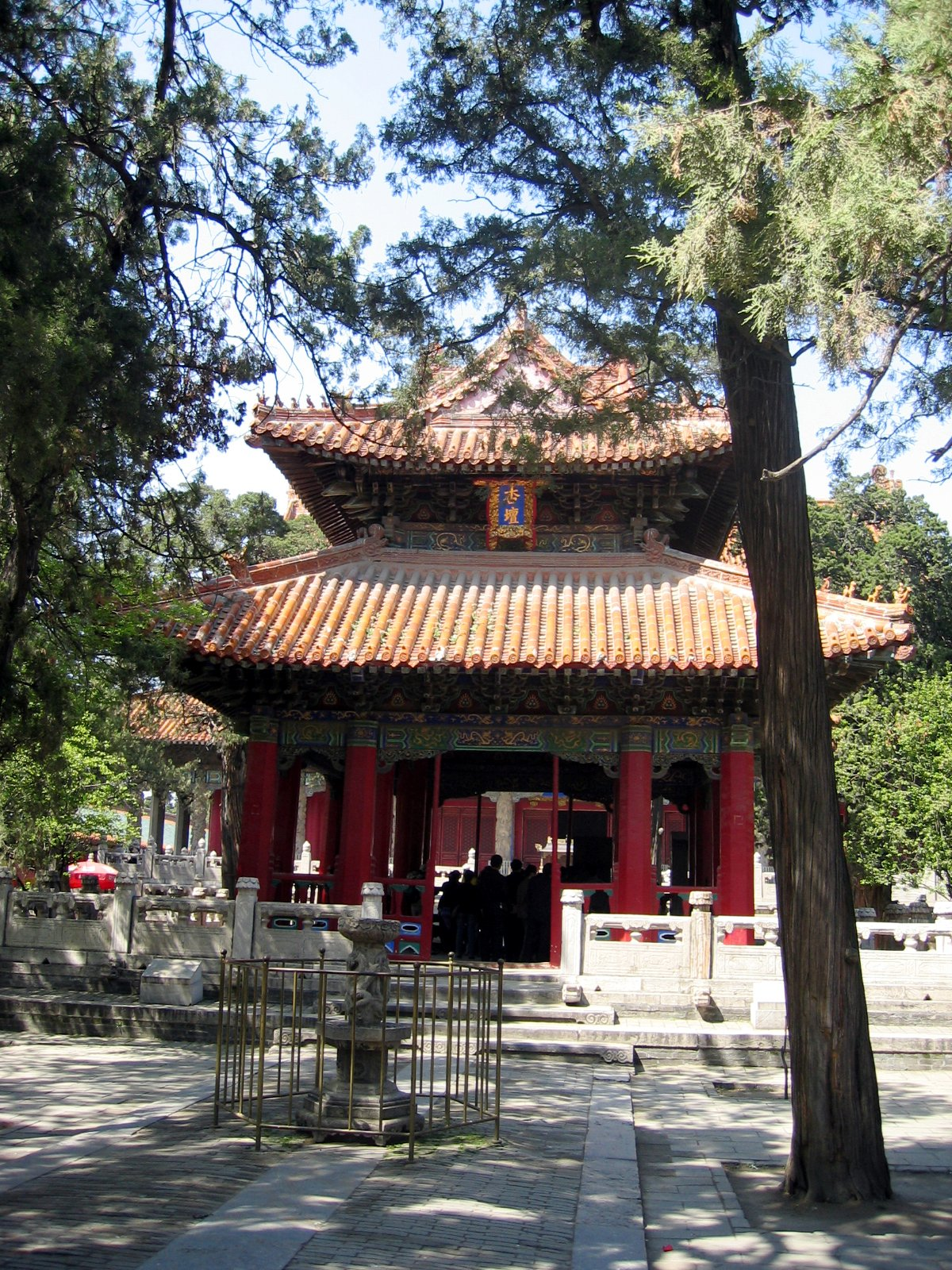
- Apricot Platform (Temple of Confucius)

- Location within Shandong Location within China
- Location: Qufu, Shandong, China
- Criteria: Cultural: (i), (iv), (vi)
- Reference: 704
- Inscription: 1994 (18th Session)
- Coordinates: 35°36′42″N 116°58′30″E

Temple and Cemetery of Confucius and the Kong Family Mansion in Qufu, Shandong Province of China, include Temple of Confucius, Cemetery of Confucius and the Kong Family Mansion.

Since 1994, the Temple of Confucius (Chinese: 孔庙; pinyin: Kǒng Miào) has been part of the UNESCO World Heritage Site "Temple and Cemetery of Confucius and the Kong Family Mansion in Qufu". The two other parts of the site are the nearby Kong Family Mansion (Chinese: 孔府; pinyin: Kǒng Fǔ), where the main-line descendants of Confucius lived, and the Cemetery of Confucius (Chinese: 孔林; pinyin: Kǒng Lín) a couple kilometers to the north, where Confucius and many of his descendants have been buried. Those three sites are collectively known in Qufu as San Kong (三孔), i.e. "The Three Confucian [sites]".

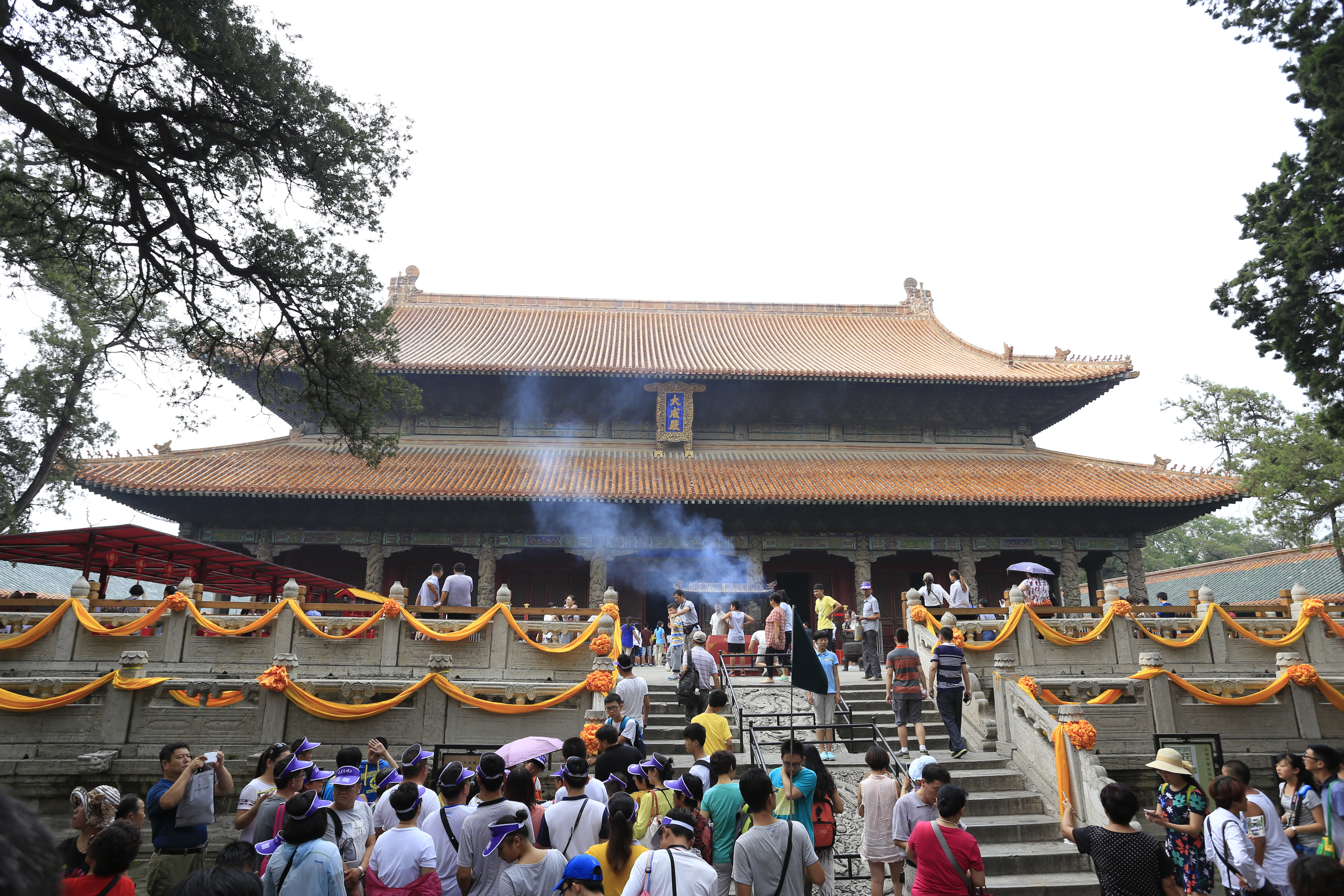
Temple of Confucius

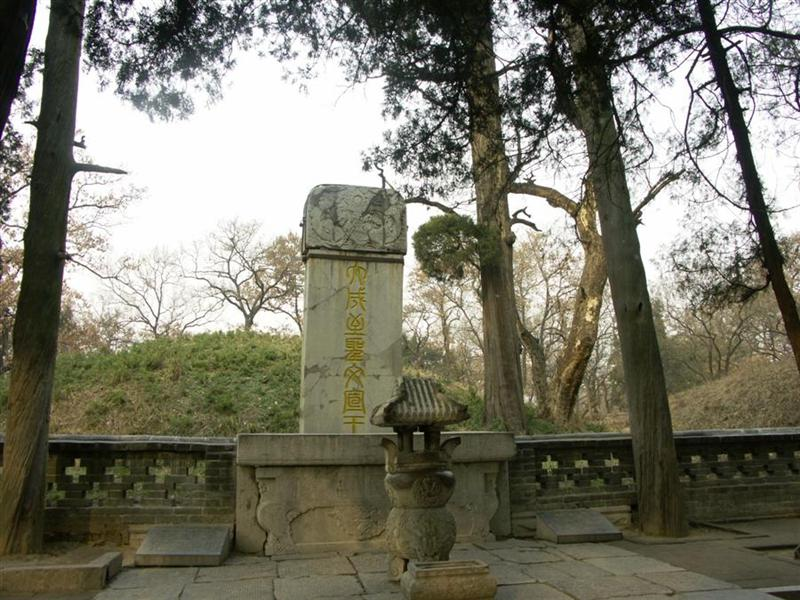
Cemetery of Confucius

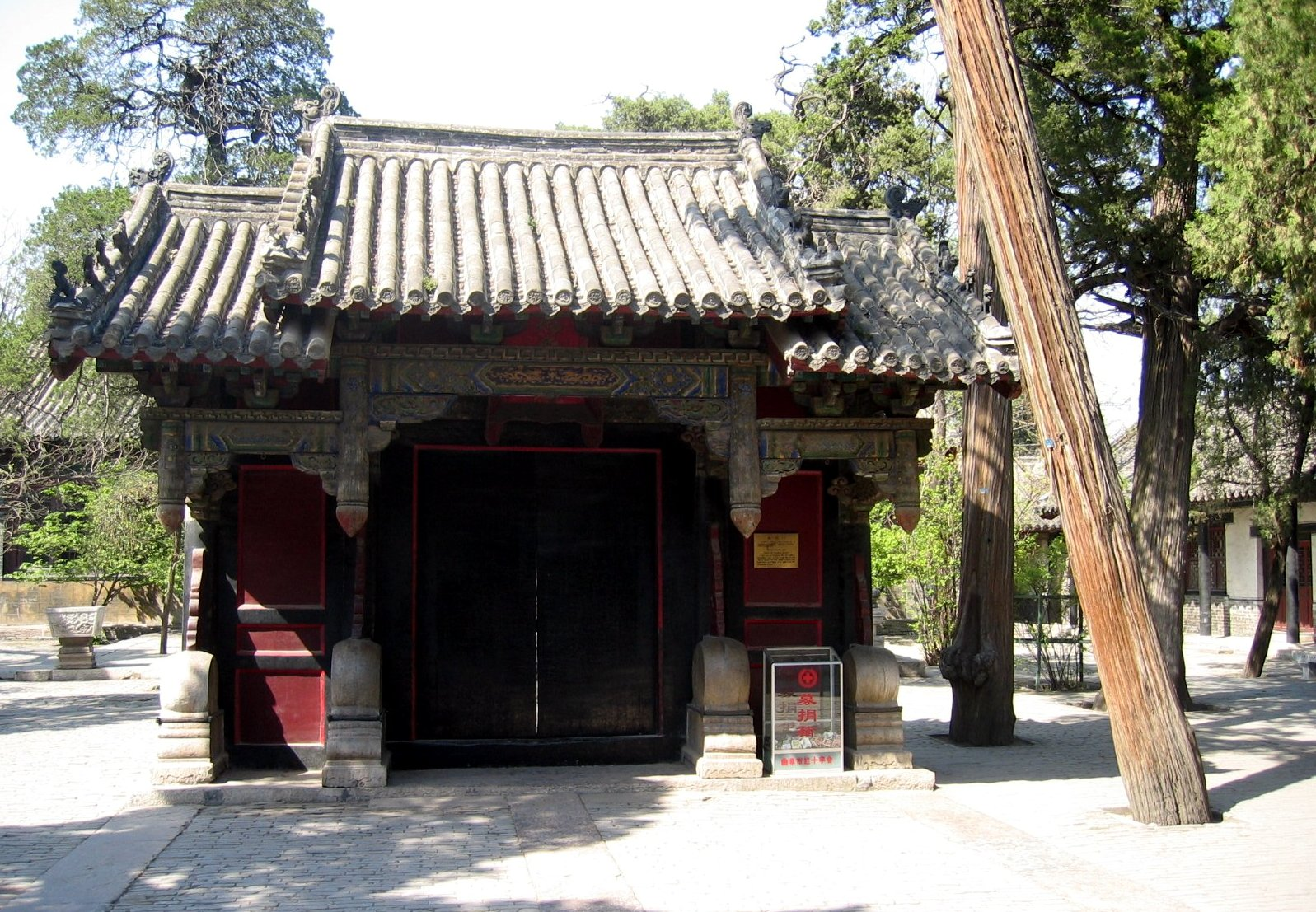
Kong Family Mansion
