= List of cemeteries in China =

This is a list of cemeteries in the People's Republic of China. Many others—particularly in central urban areas—were destroyed during the Cultural Revolution of the late 1960s and 1970s, which regularized the use of cremation even in the cases of religious minorities such as the Hui. Since the reform and opening up began in the 1980s, mortuary sites have been reopened in more out-lying areas, run as commercial operations.

- Cemetery of Confucius, Shandong
- Babaoshan Revolutionary Cemetery, Beijing
- National Revolutionary Army Memorial Cemetery ("Hope Valley Park"), Jiangsu
- Astana Cemetery, Xinjiang
- Lingshan Islamic Cemetery, Fujian
- Cemetery of Zhaojun, Inner Mongolia
- Mawangdui at Changsha, Hunan
- Foochow Mission Cemetery, Fuzhou
- 44 at present in Shanghai, including the Longhua Martyrs' Memorial and the Wanguo Gongmu housing the remains of Soong Ching-ling

== See also ==
- List of cemeteries in Hong Kong
- List of cemeteries in Macau
