= Cemetery of Confucius =

UNESCO World Heritage Site in China

UNESCO World Heritage Site
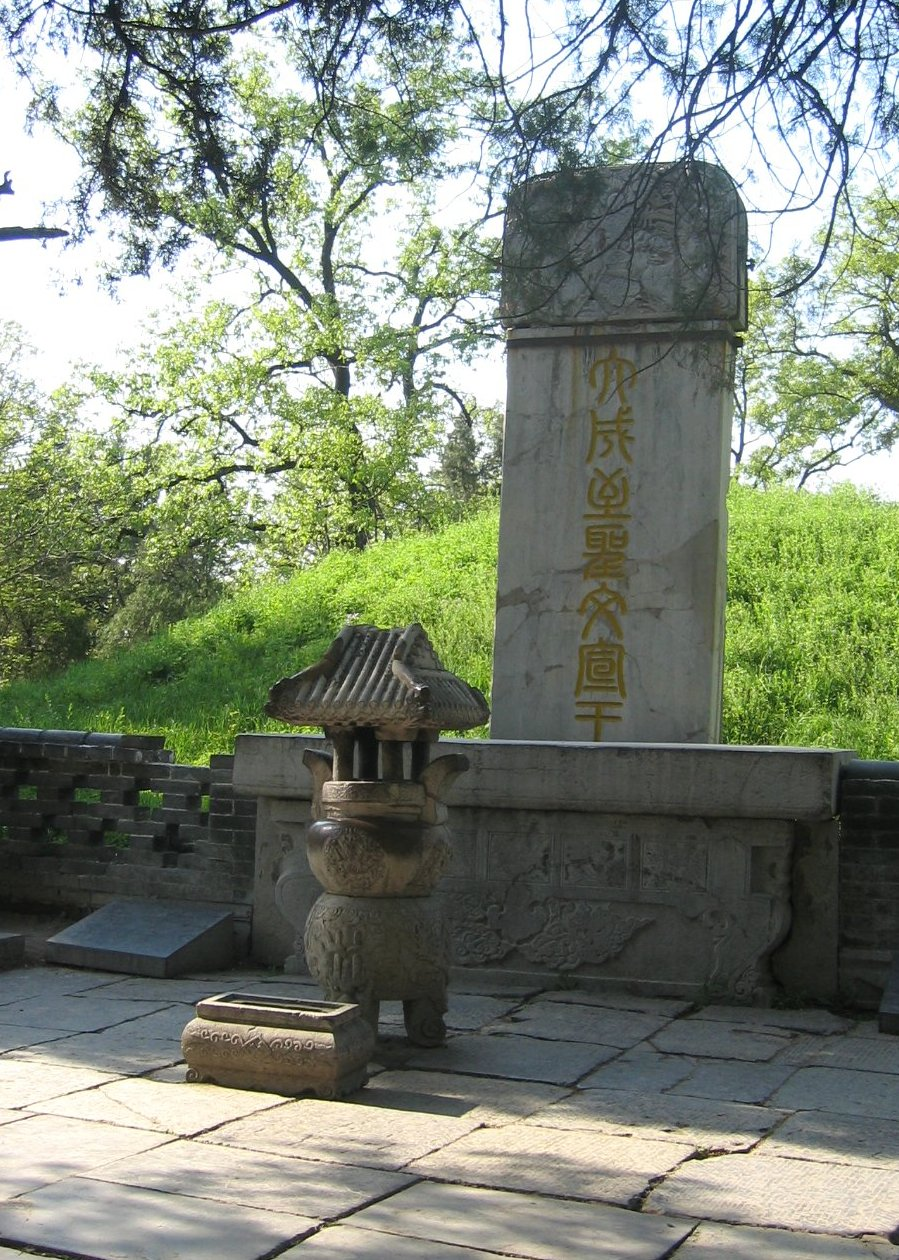
- Tomb of Confucius

- Location within Shandong Location within China
- Location: Qufu, Shandong, China
- Part of: Temple and Cemetery of Confucius and the Kong Family Mansion in Qufu
- Criteria: Cultural: (i), (iv), (vi)
- Reference: 704
- Inscription: 1994 (18th Session)
- Coordinates: 35°37′07″N 116°59′11″E

Chinese name
- Chinese: 孔林
- Literal meaning: "Kong Forest [of gravestones]"
Transcriptions
Standard Mandarin
- Hanyu Pinyin: Kǒng lín
- IPA: [kʰʊ̀ŋ lǐn]
Wu
- Romanization: Khon^{去} lin^{平}
Yue: Cantonese
- Yale Romanization: Húng làhm
- Jyutping: Hung2 lam4
Southern Min
- Tâi-lô: Khóng lîm

The Cemetery of Confucius (Chinese: 孔林; pinyin: Kǒng lín; lit. 'Kong Forest [of gravestones]') is a cemetery of the Kong clan (the descendants of Confucius) in Confucius' hometown Qufu in eastern Shandong province. Confucius himself and some of his disciples are buried there, as well as many thousands of his descendants.

Since 1994, the Cemetery of Confucius has been part of the UNESCO World Heritage Site "Temple and Cemetery of Confucius and the Kong Family Mansion in Qufu". The two other components of the site are the Temple of Confucius dedicated to the memory of the statesman and philosopher and the Kong Family Mansion, where his descendants lived. The three sites are collectively known in Qufu as San Kong (三孔), i.e. "The Three Confucian [sites]".

== History ==
By the 2nd century AD, at least 50 of Confucius's descendants had been buried alongside him. In 1331, construction work began on the wall and gate of the cemetery. In total, the cemetery has undergone 13 renovations and extensions. Eventually, by the late 18th century, the perimeter wall reached a length of 7.5 kilometres (4.7 mi), enclosing an area of 3.6 square kilometres (1.4 sq mi). In this space, the tombs of more than 100,000 descendants of Confucius, who have been buried there over a period of about 2,000 years, can be found. The oldest graves date back to the Zhou dynasty, the most recent of which belong to descendants in the 76th and 78th generation.

During the wars between the Song dynasty and the Jurchen Jin, the surrounding region was occupied by Wanyan Zonghan's force. Among them, there were soldiers who wanted to dig up Confucius's tomb. Wanyan Zonghan (完顏宗翰/粘沒喝) then asked his translator and advisor Gao Xingrui (高慶裔), "Who is Confucius?" "A great saint from the ancient time." answered Gao. Then Wanyan Zonghan said, "How can we dig up a great saint's tomb!" He then executed the soldiers who wanted to do so.

The cemetery suffered serious damage in November 1966, during the Cultural Revolution, when it was visited and vandalized by a team of Red Guards from Beijing Normal University, led by Tan Houlan (谭厚兰). The corpse of the 76th generation Duke Yansheng Kong Lingyi (1872–1919), a late Qing official known for his collaboration with Japan, was removed from its grave and hung naked from a tree in front of the palace during the Cultural Revolution.

== Layout ==
The Cemetery of Confucius is located north of the historic walled city of Qufu, about two kilometers north of the Temple and Mansion of Confucius (which are in the south-central part of the walled city), and 1.5 km north of the Temple of Yan Hui, dedicated to the sage's favorite protege (which is just inside the northern gates of the city wall). The main north-central axis of the walled city, Gulou Jie ("Drum Tower Avenue"), becomes Beiguan Jie ("North Gate Avenue") after passing through the north gate of the city wall. The avenue runs north for 1266 m as a wide boulevard decorated with the Wan gu chang chun (萬古長春) memorial arch and lined by cypresses and pine trees, finally arriving at the main (southern) gates of the cemetery.

The cemetery occupies 183.33 hectares (1.8333 km^{2}) and is surrounded by a perimeter wall 5,591 m long.

Spirit ways and tombs of the Kong clan

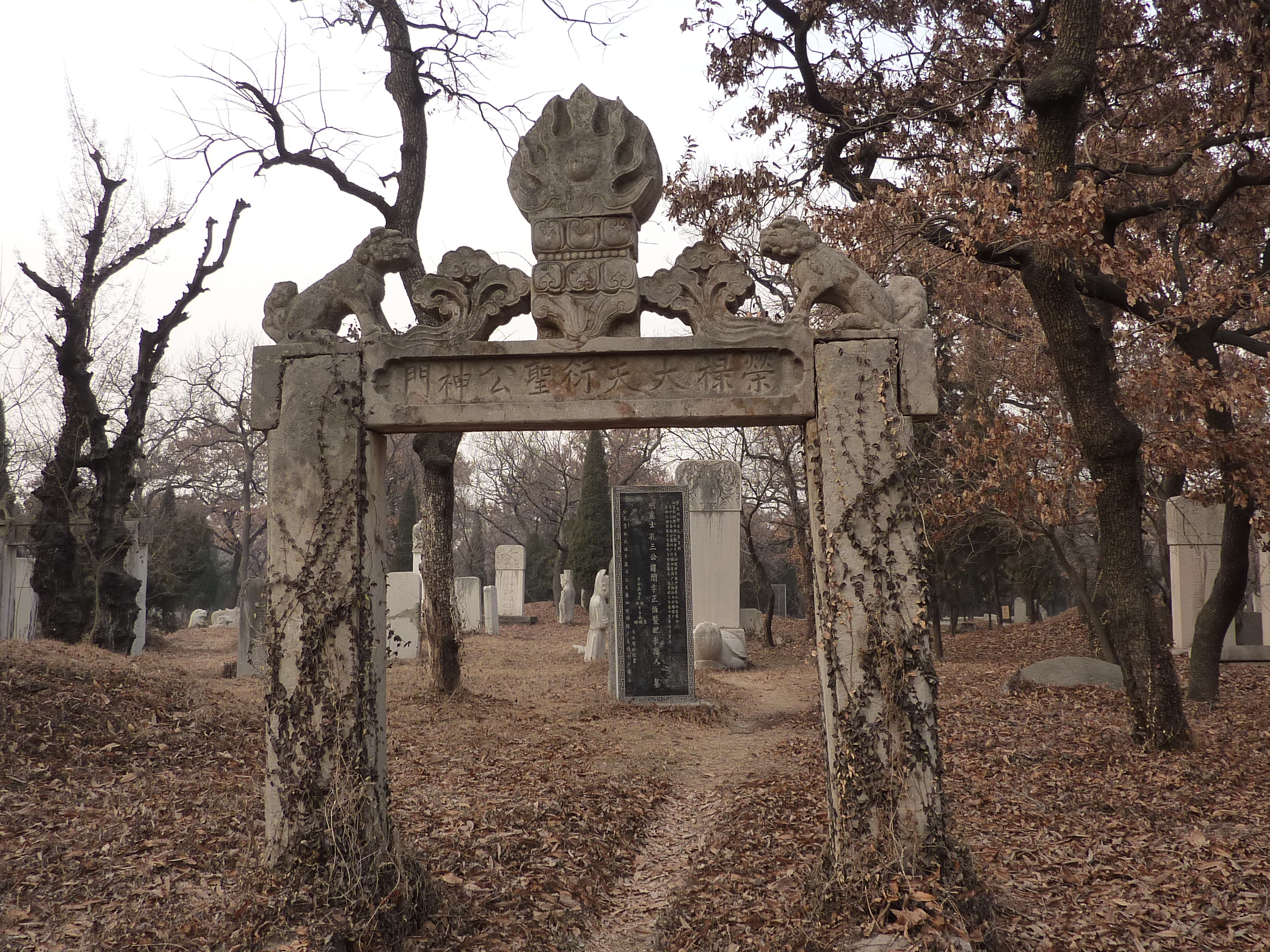
Spirit way of Kong Yanjin (59th generation Duke Yansheng)

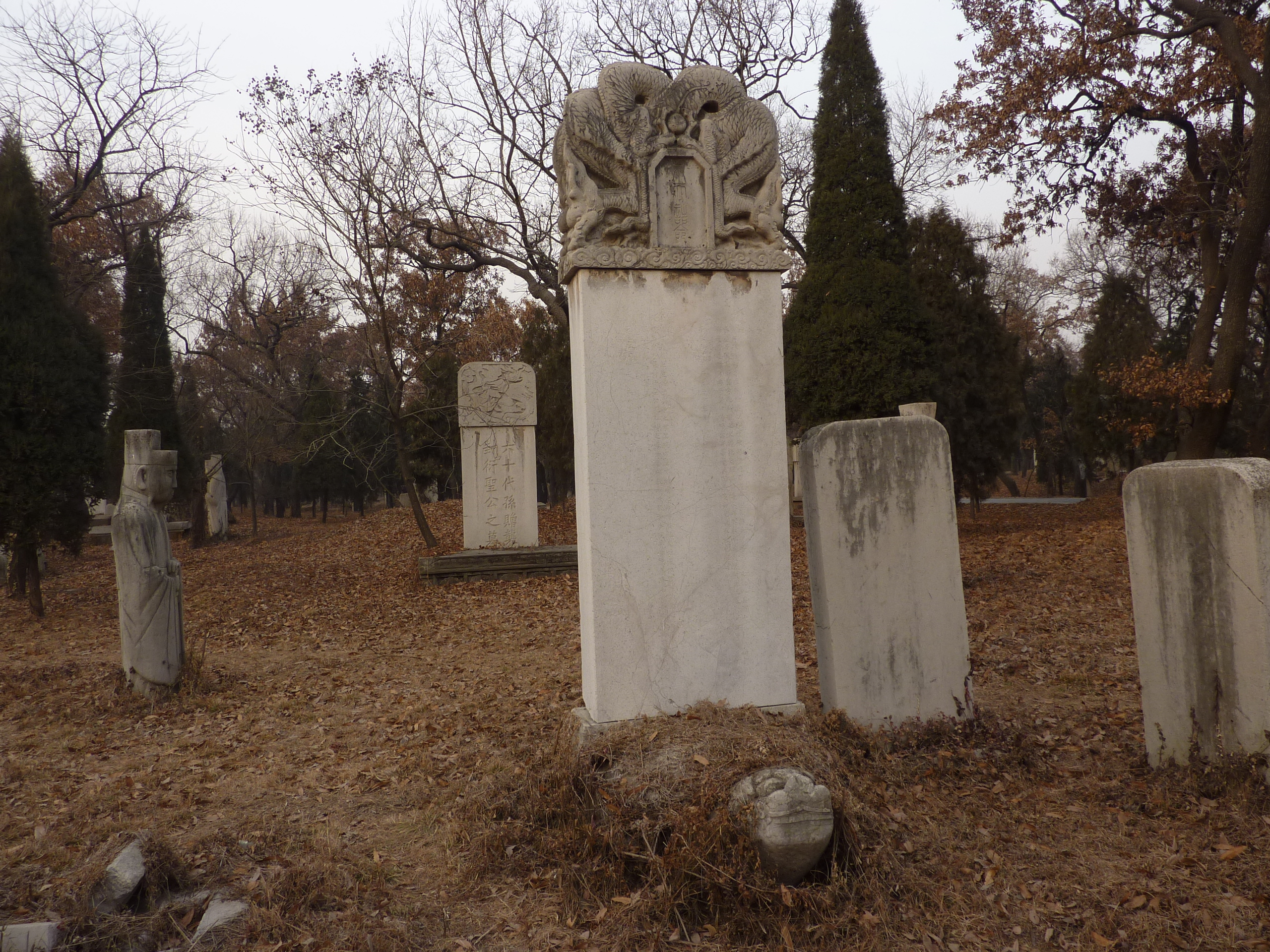
Spirit way of Kong Chengqing (60th generation)

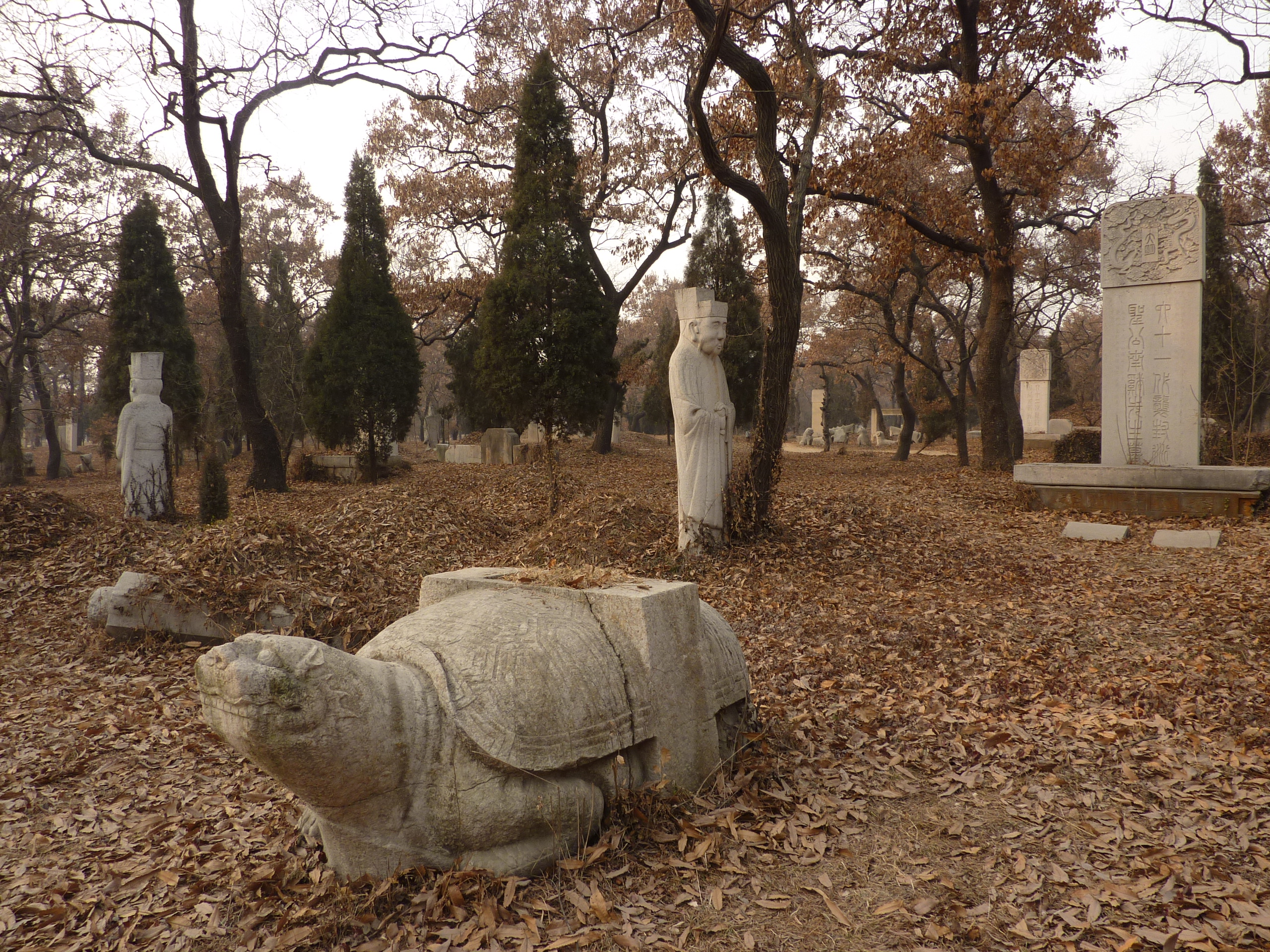
Spirit way of Kong Hongxu (61st generation)

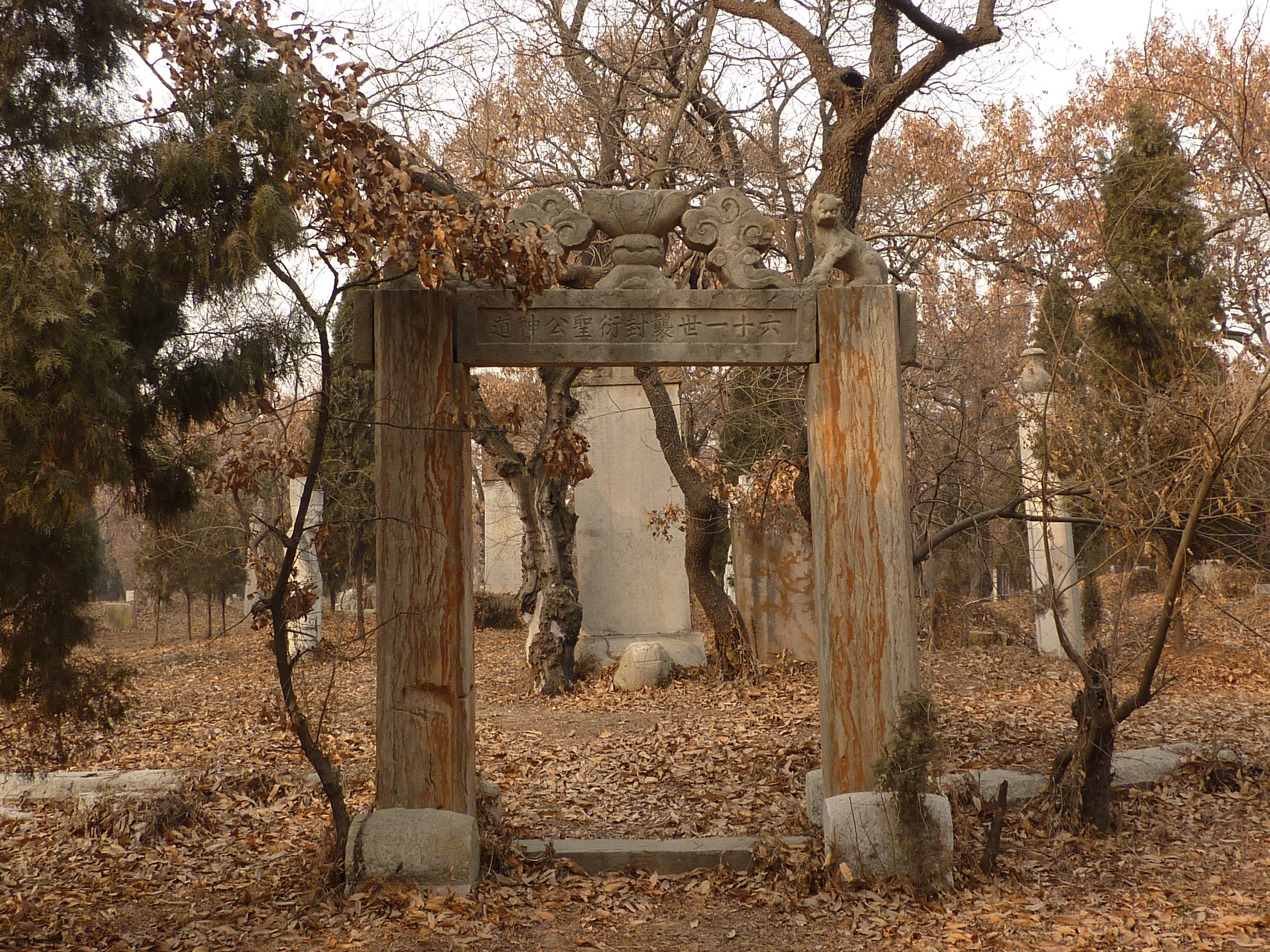
Spirit way of Kong Hongtai (61st generation)

The oldest graves found in this location date back to the Zhou dynasty. The original tomb erected here in memory of Confucius on the bank of the Sishui River had the shape of an axe. In addition, it had a brick platform for sacrifices. The present-day tomb is a cone-shaped hill. Tombs for the descendants of Confucius and additional stelae to commemorate him were soon added around Confucius' tomb.

Since Confucius' descendants were conferred noble titles (Duke Yansheng) and were given imperial princesses as wives, many of the tombs in the cemetery show the status symbols of noblemen. Tombstones came into use during the Han dynasty. Today, there are over three thousand stone tablets (mostly, tombstones) dating from China's imperial period still standing in the cemetery. According to an official count, among them there are 22 tablets from the Song dynasty, six from Jin, 45 from Yuan, 506 from Ming and 2626 from Qing still standing in the cemetery. There are also 568 tablets from the Republic of China period and 50 modern (PRC-era) tablets, as well as 180 tablets whose age cannot be determined; this brings the total to 4003.

The Ming burials are primarily found in the western part of the cemetery, and those from the Qing era, in the eastern part. In the Ming section, particularly notable is a comparatively small area located about 1 km to the northwest of the Tomb of Confucius, where about a dozen of Dukes of Yansheng, from the 55th to the 64th generation, have been buried. The dukes' tomb sites in this area are arranged more or less chronologically in rows from the south to the north, and, within each row, from the east of the west. Each duke has his own spirit way, oriented from the south to the north, which typically includes (in the south-to-north order) the following sculptures: three pairs of animals (felines, sometimes winged; rams; horses); a memorial arch; a bixi with a stele; two guardian figures (a warrior on the west side of the path, and a civil official on the east side); and a stele in front of the small tumulus under which the duke is buried. A smaller subsidiary area with late Ming – early Qing spirit ways, is located about 500 m northeast of this main area.

More than 10,000 mature trees give the cemetery a forest-like appearance.

Spirit ways of the Ming-era Dukes of Yansheng

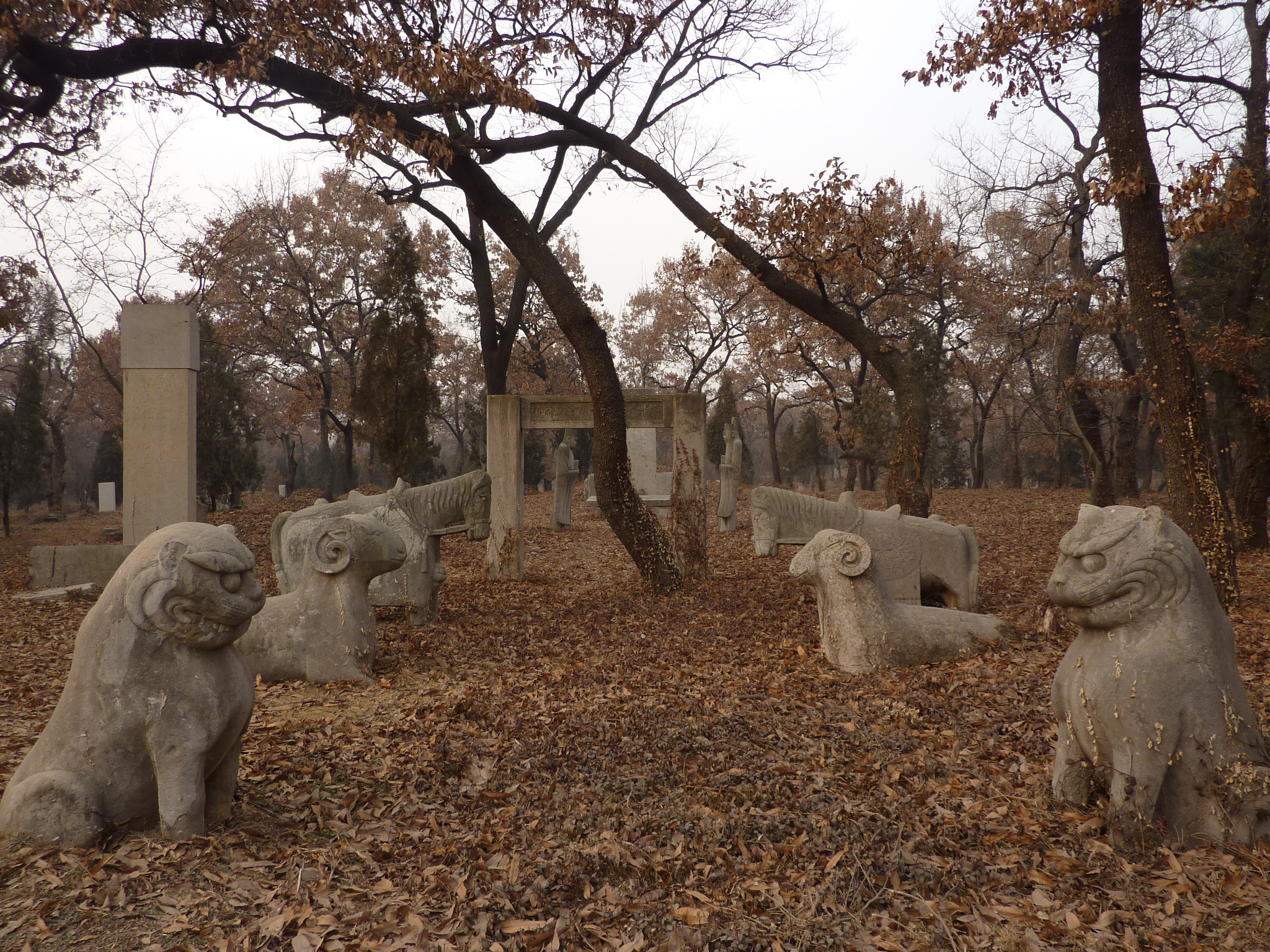
Kong Zhengan (63rd generation)

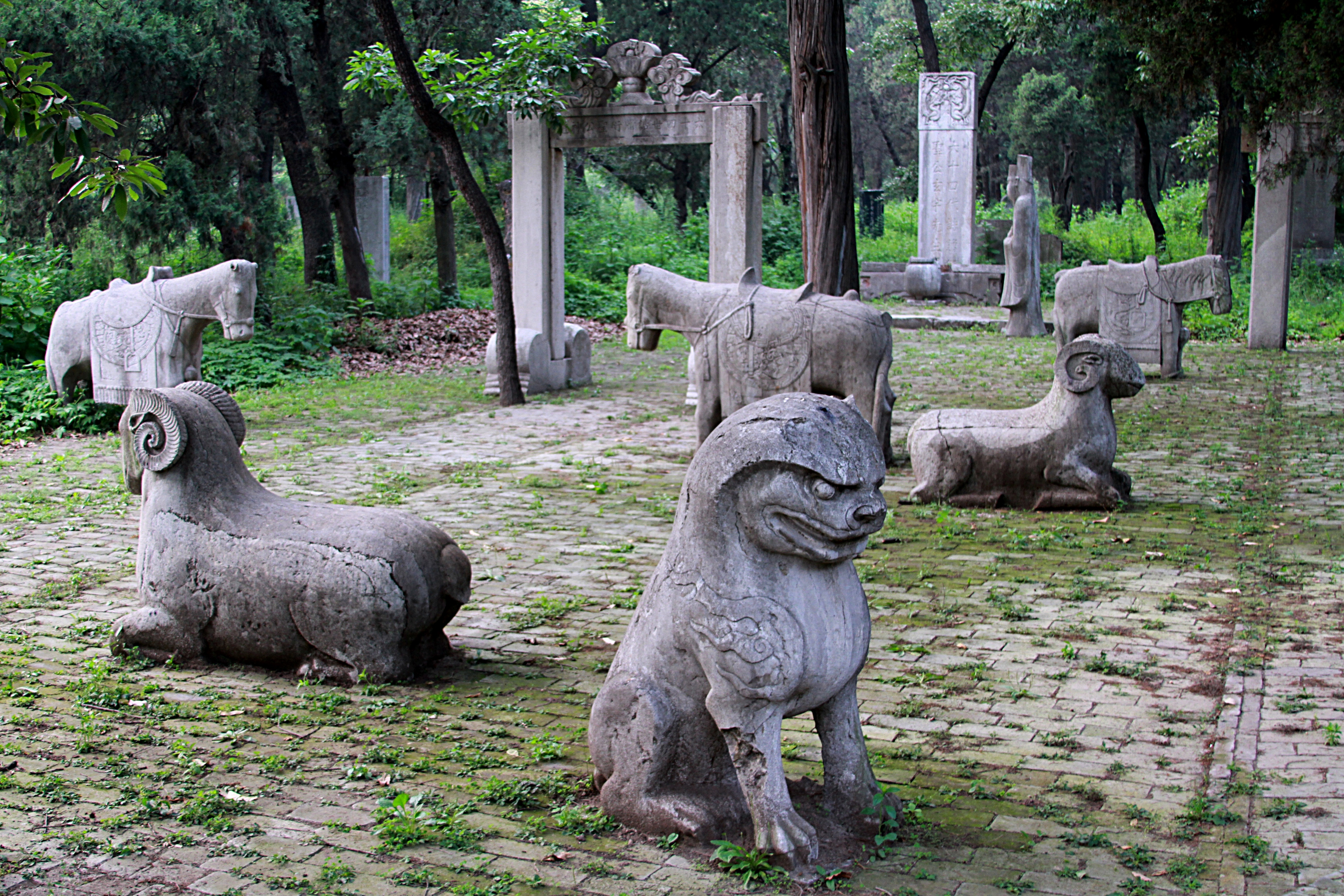
Kong Shangtan (64th generation)

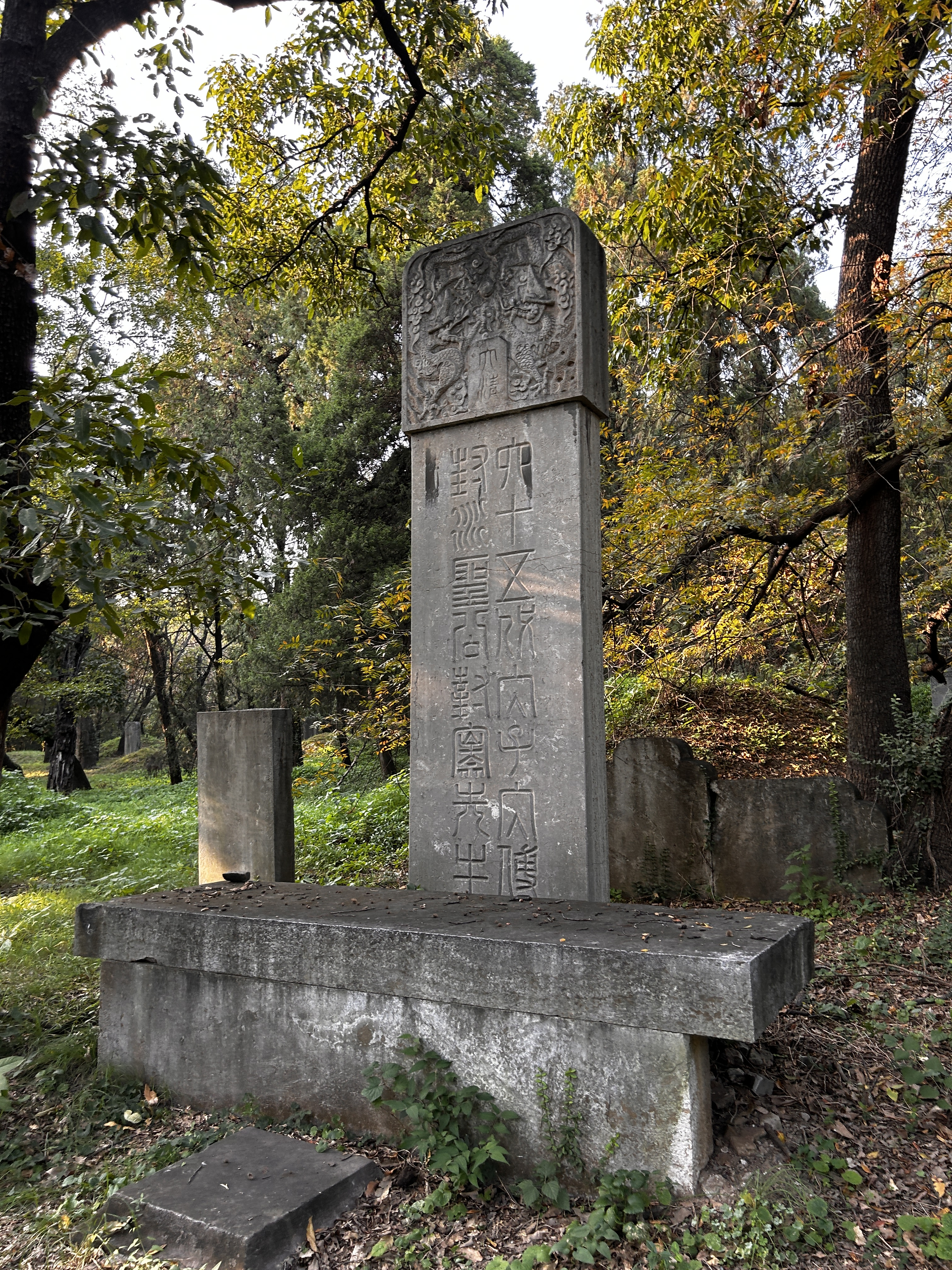
Kong Yinzhi (65th generation)
Tombs of the Qing-era Dukes of Yansheng

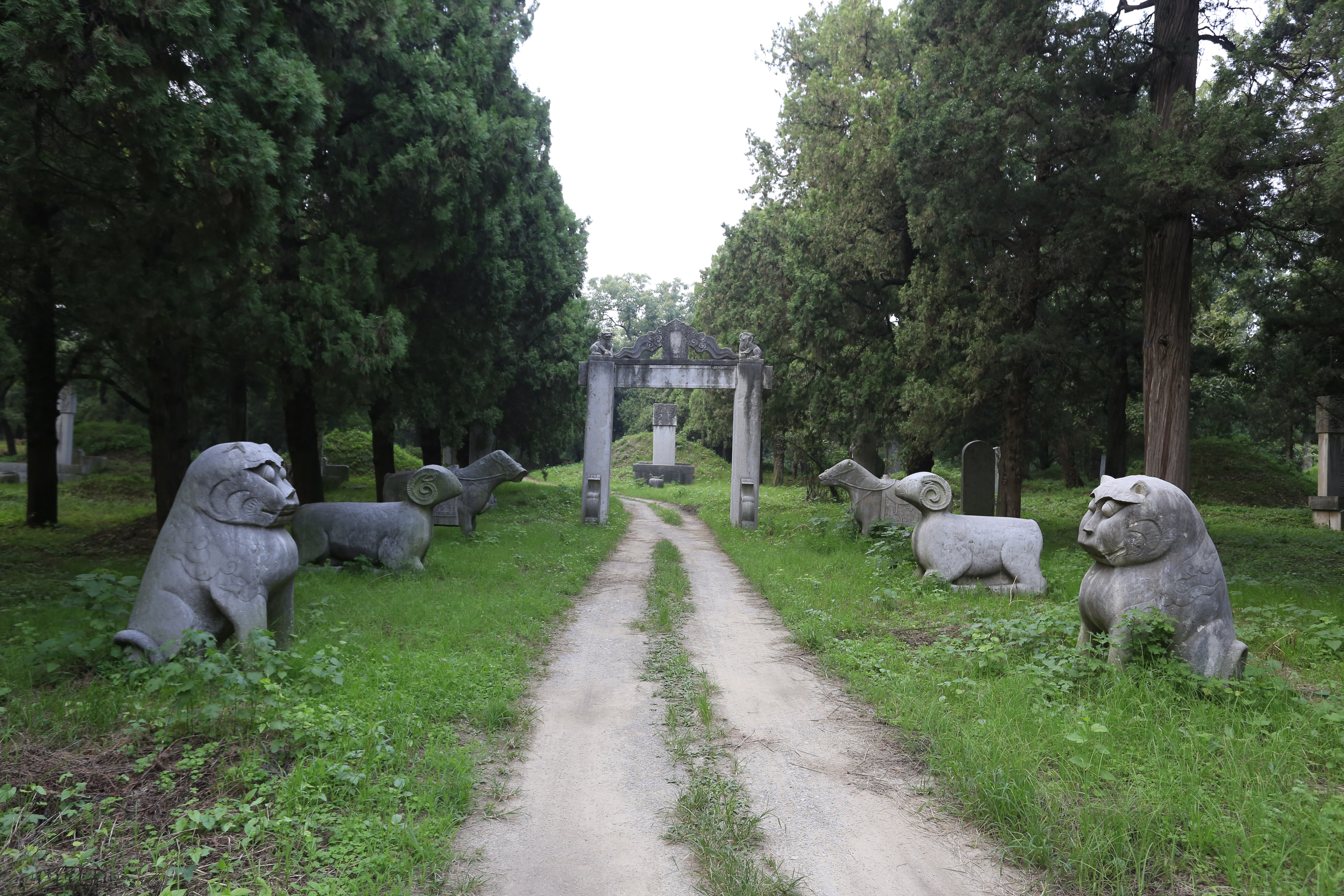
Kong Yuqi (67th generation)

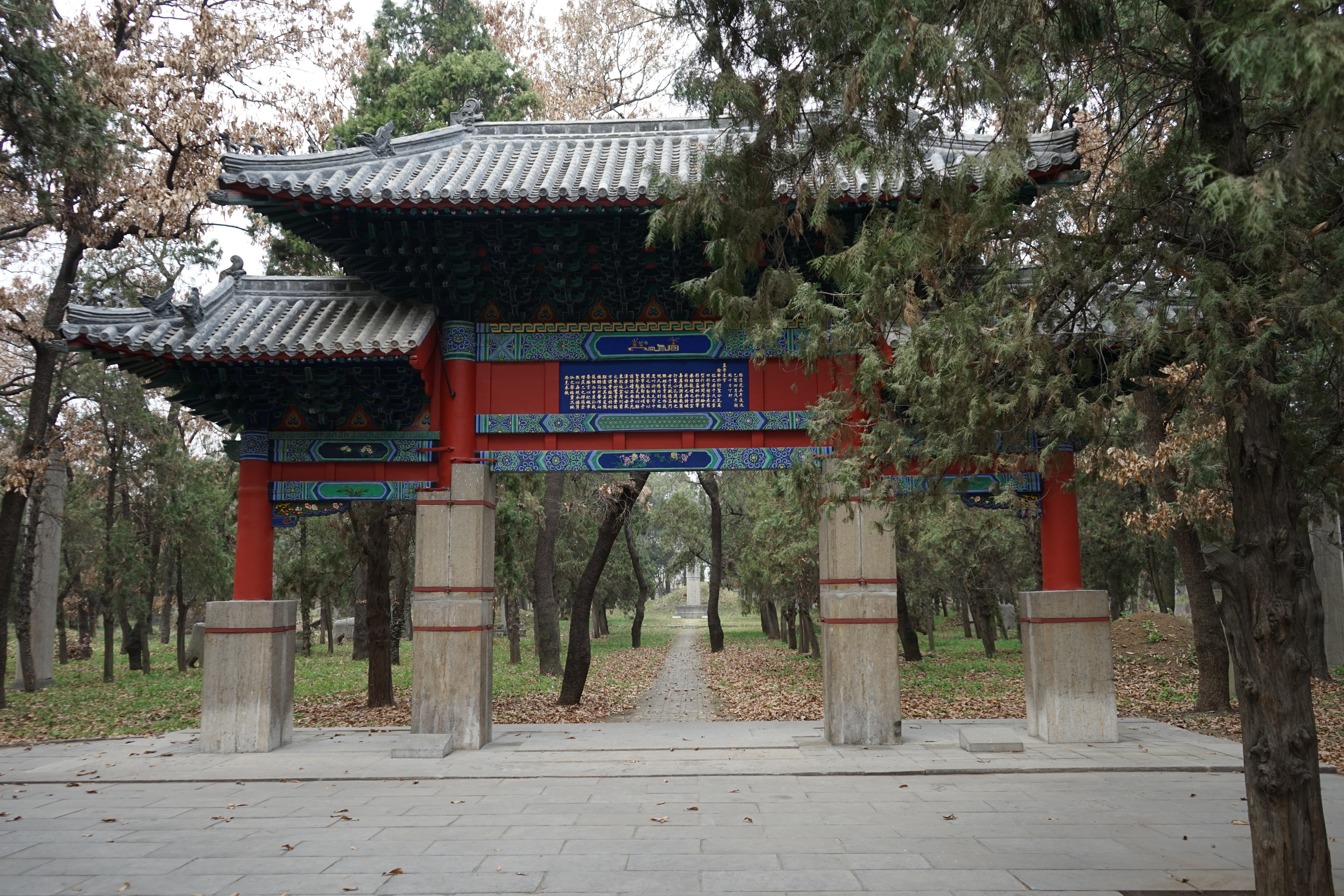
Lady Yu, wife of Kong Xianpei (72nd generation)

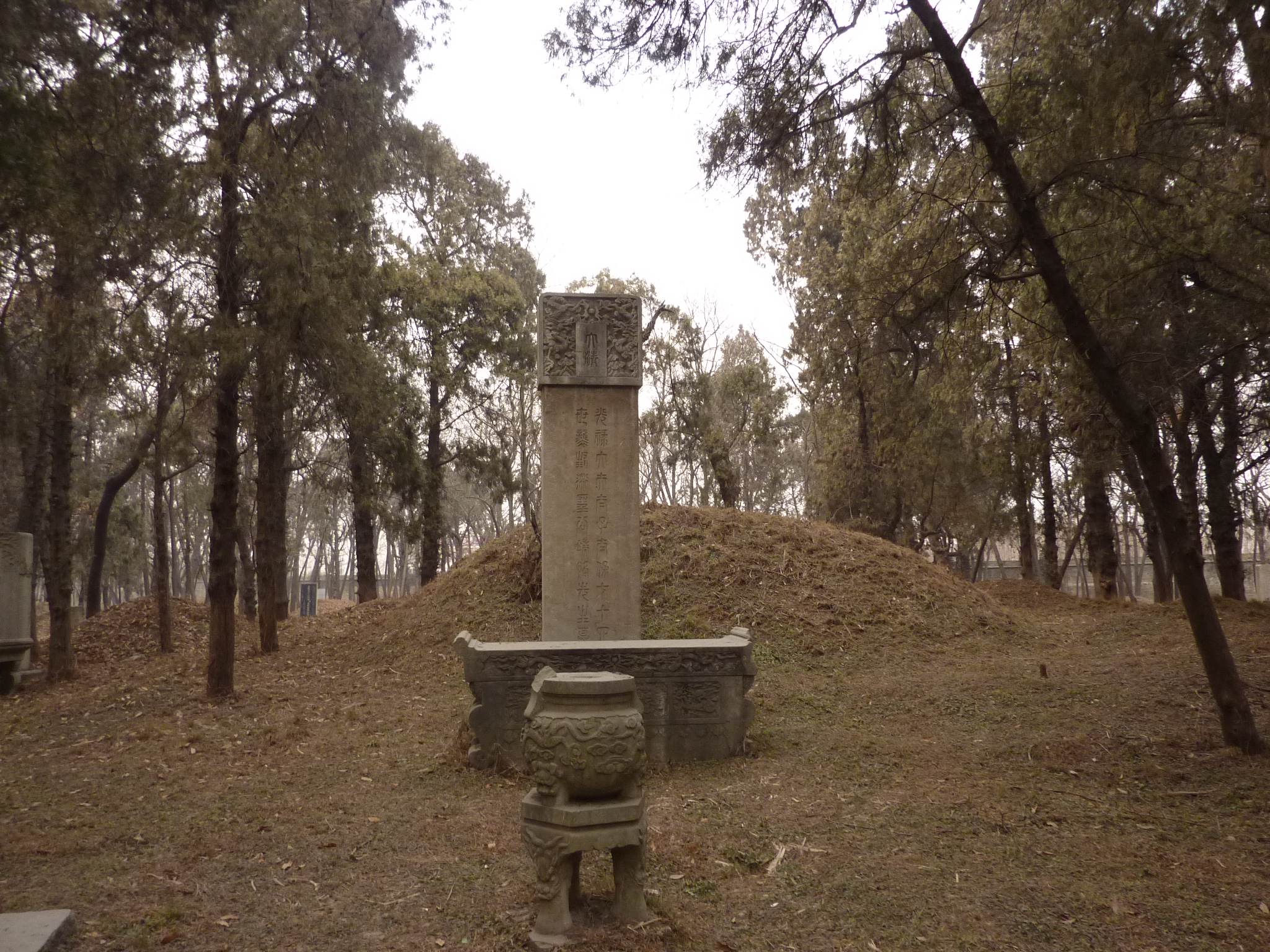
Kong Fanhao (74th generation)

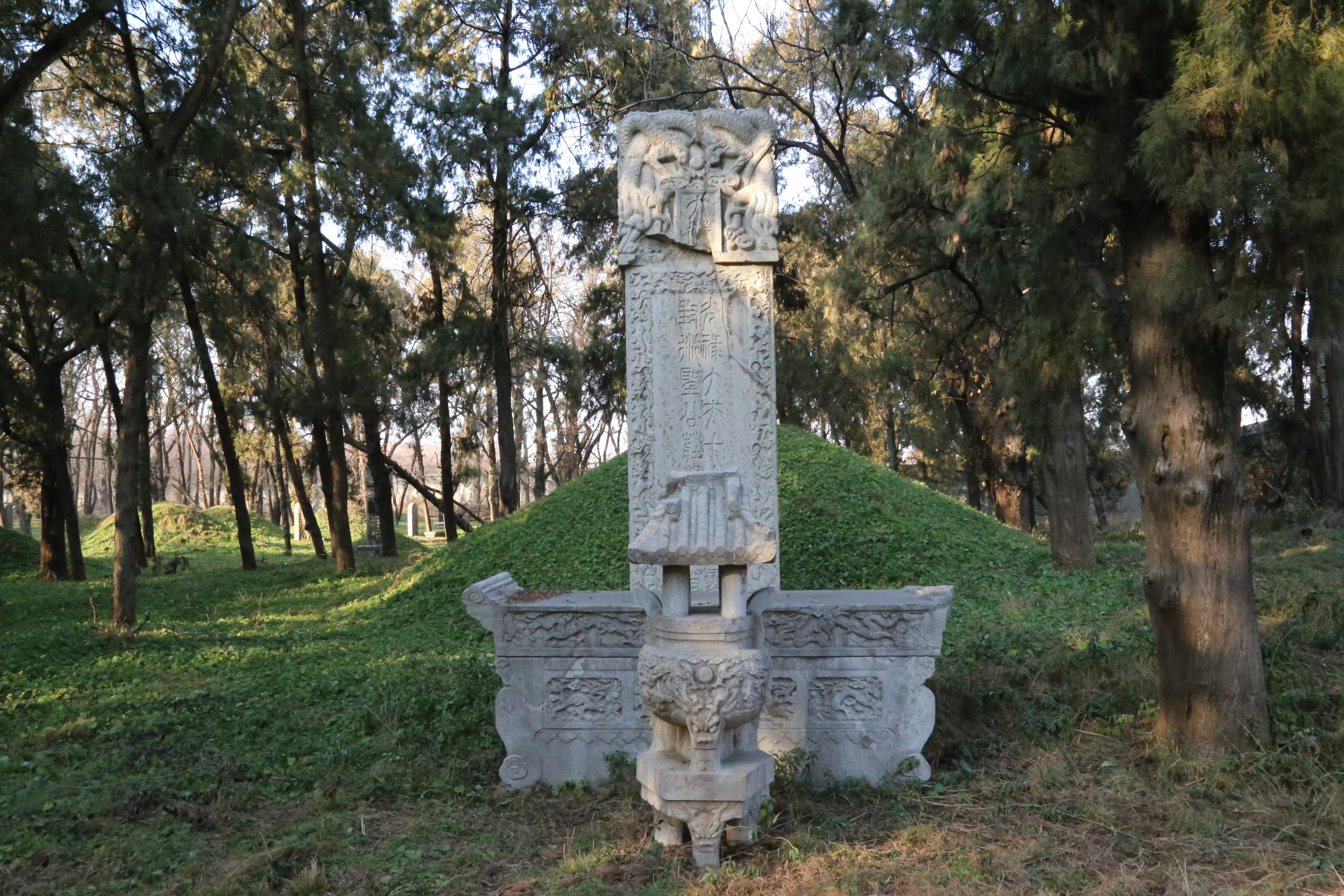
Kong Xiangke (75th generation)

== See also ==
- Temple of Zengzi 曾廟
- Mencius's sites – Meng family mansion 孟府, Temple of Mencius 孟廟, and Cemetery of Mencius 孟林
