= Kong Family Mansion =

UNESCO World Heritage Site
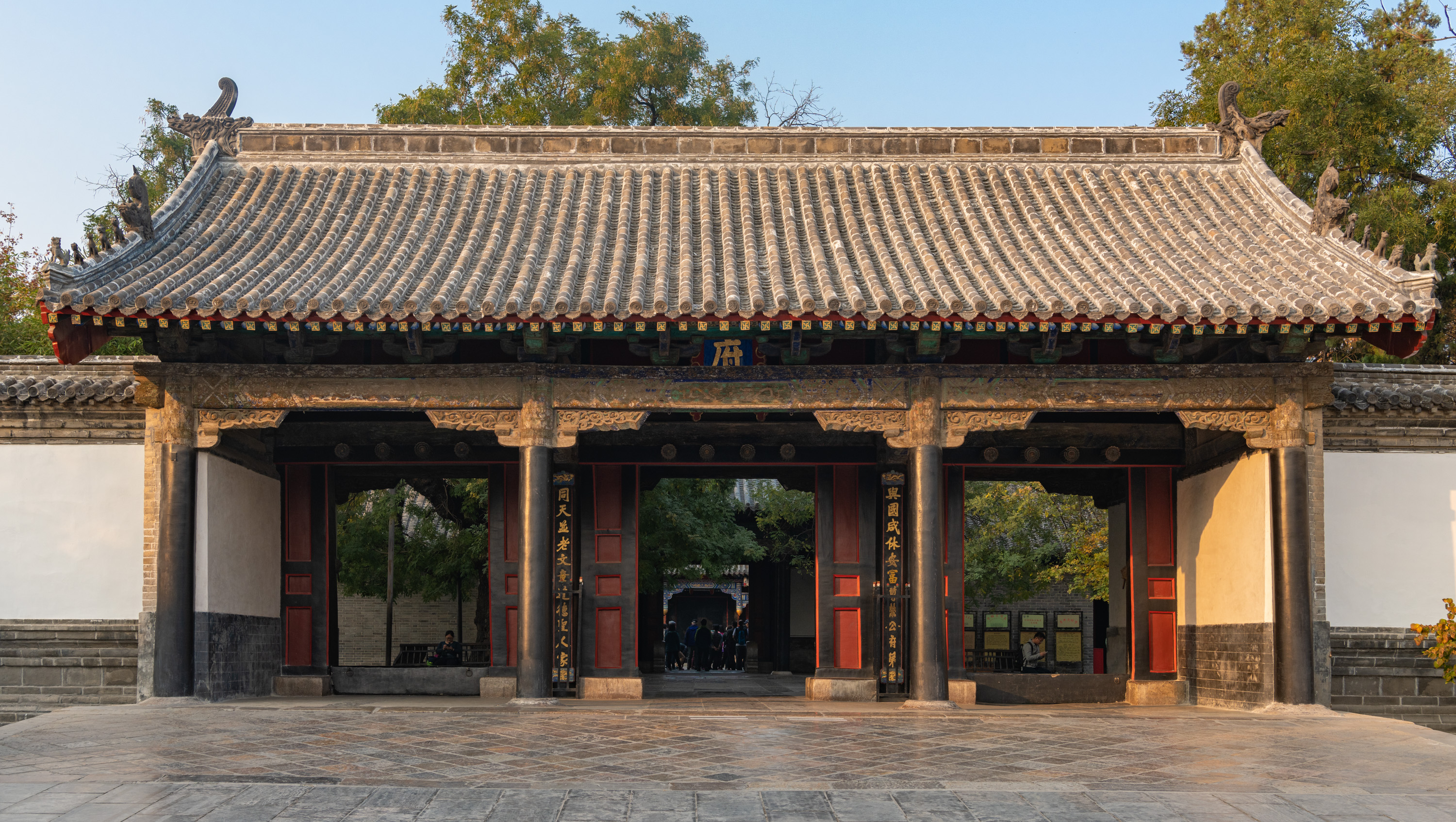
- The main gate of Kong Family Mansion

- Location within Shandong Location within China
- Location: Qufu, Shandong, China
- Part of: Temple and Cemetery of Confucius and the Kong Family Mansion in Qufu
- Criteria: Cultural: (i), (iv), (vi)
- Reference: 704
- Inscription: 1994 (18th Session)
- Coordinates: 35°35′48″N 116°59′28.8″E

Chinese name
- Chinese: 孔府
Transcriptions
Standard Mandarin
- Hanyu Pinyin: Kǒng fǔ
- IPA: [kʰʊ̀ŋ fù]
Yue: Cantonese
- Yale Romanization: Húng Fú
- Jyutping: Hung2 Fu2
- IPA: [hʊŋ˧˥ fu˧˥]
Southern Min
- Tâi-lô: Khóng Hú

The Kong Family Mansion (Chinese: 孔府; pinyin: Kǒng fǔ) was the historical residence of the direct descendants of Confucius in the City of Qufu, the hometown of Confucius in Shandong Province, China. The extant structures mainly date from the Ming and Qing dynasties. From the mansion, the family tended to the Confucian sites in Qufu and also governed the largest private rural estate in China. The Kong family was in charge of conducting elaborate religious ceremonies on occasions such as plantings, harvests, honoring the dead, and birthdays. Today, the mansion is a museum and part of the UNESCO World Heritage Site "Temple and Cemetery of Confucius and the Kong Family Mansion in Qufu".

== Layout ==
The mansion is located immediately to the east of the Temple of Confucius to which it had been formerly connected. The layout of the mansion is traditionally Chinese and separates official spaces in the style of a Yamen in the front of the complex from the residential quarters in the rear. Besides the yamen and the inner quarters, the complex also contains an eastern and a western study as well as a back garden. Within this overall arrangement, the spatial distribution of the buildings according to the seniority, gender, and status of their inhabitants reflects the Confucian principle of order and hierarchy: The most senior descendant of Confucius took up residence in the central of the three main buildings; his younger brother occupied the Yi Gun hall to the east. The eastern study was used by the Duke of Yansheng to meet official guests and worship his ancestors. The western study was used by the family for study, meals, and entertaining friends. In its present layout, the mansion comprises 152 buildings with 480 rooms, which cover an area of 12,470 square metres (134,200 sq ft). Its tallest structure is the four-story refuge tower (Chinese: 避難樓; pinyin: Bìnán Lóu) that was designed as a shelter during an attack but was never used. The mansion houses an archive with about 60,000 documents related to the life in the mansion over a period of 400 years during the Ming and Qing dynasties.

== History ==
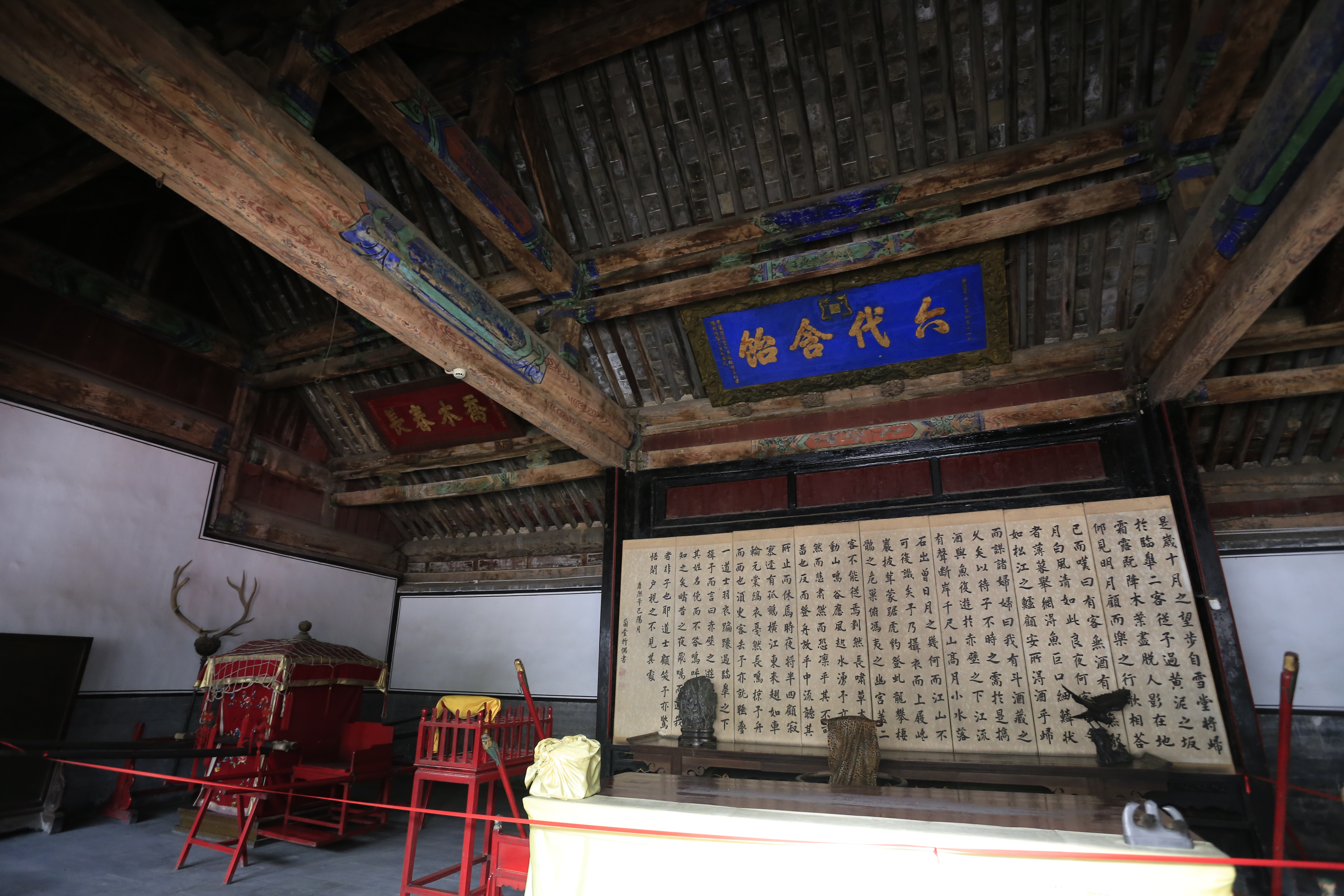
Third Hall

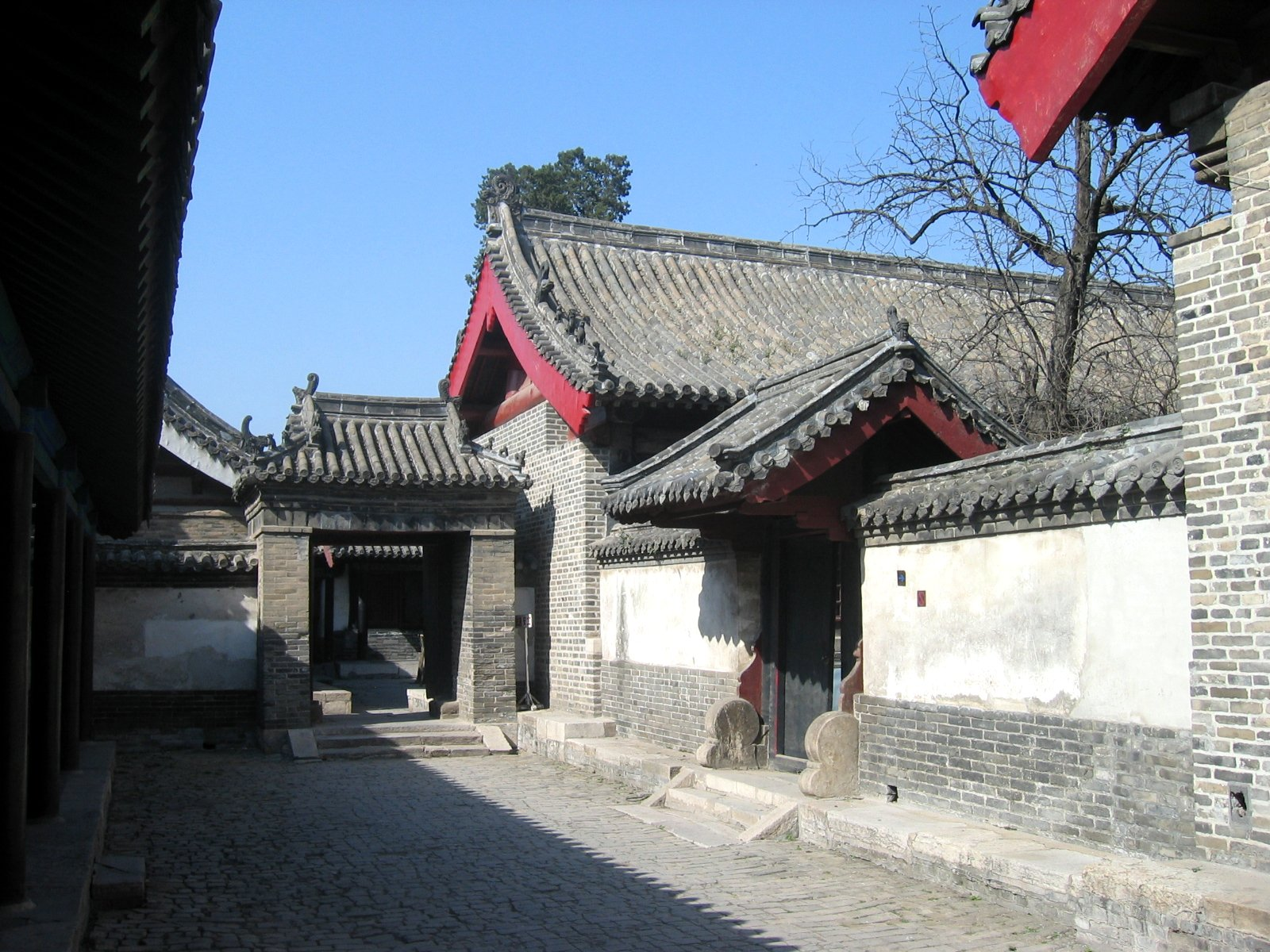
A side courtyard

The first mansion for the Kong family of the Duke Yansheng was built in 1038 during the Song dynasty. In 1377, the mansion was relocated and rebuilt under orders of the first emperor of the Ming dynasty. In 1503, during the reign of the Hongzhi Emperor, the complex was expanded into three rows of buildings with 560 rooms and – like the neighboring Confucius Temple – nine courtyards. During the Qing dynasty, the mansion underwent a complete renovation in 1838 only to be damaged in a fire 48 years later that destroyed the women's quarters in 1886. Even during the fire, men did not dare to enter the women's part of the mansion to fight the fire, leading to greater damage to this portion of the mansion complex. The damaged portions of the mansion were rebuilt two years later; the cost of both these 19th-century renovations was covered by the emperor. Despite these later renovations, the Kong Family Mansion remains the best-preserved Ming-era residential complex of its size. The last head of the Kong family to live in the mansion was Kong Decheng, the 77th generation descendant of Confucius. Kong Decheng fled to Chongqing because of the Second Sino-Japanese War in 1937. He did not return to Qufu but moved on to Taiwan during the Chinese Civil War.

There is another Kong Family Mansion in Quzhou built by the southern branch of Confucius descendants.

Traditional Ming dynasty hanfu robes given by the Ming emperors to the Chinese noble Dukes Yansheng, descended from Confucius, are still preserved in the Confucius Mansion after over five centuries. Robes from the Qing emperors are also preserved there. The Jurchens in the Jin dynasty and Mongols in the Yuan dynasty continued to patronize and support the Confucian Duke Yansheng.

General Secretary of the Chinese Communist Party Xi Jinping visited the Kong Family Mansion in 2013 to commemorate the 2,565th anniversary of Confucius' birth.

== Structures ==
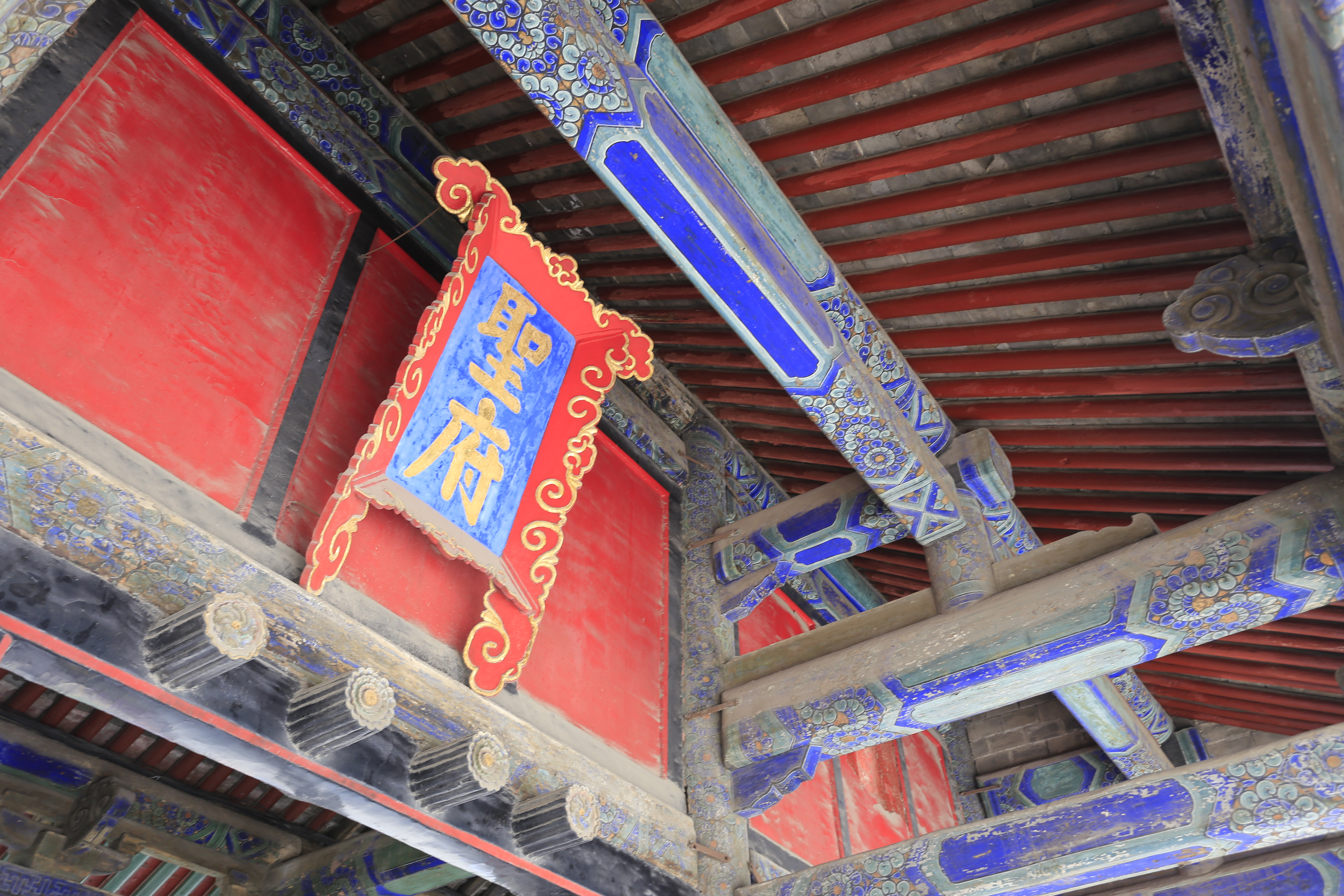
Sage Mansion

The major structures along the central axis of the mansion (from south to north) are:

=== Administrative portion ===
==== Main Gate ====
The main entrance gate to the complex (Chinese: 孔府大門; pinyin: Kǒngfǔ Dàmén) is marked by a tablet that reads "Sage Mansion" (Chinese: 聖府; pinyin: Shèngfǔ).

==== Central Courtyard ====
The central courtyard is flanked to the east and west by former administrative office buildings. The administration of the Kong family's official functions and businesses was structured into departments similar to the six ministries of the imperial government: Department of Rites (ancestor worship), Department of Seals (jurisdiction and edicts), Music, Letters, and Archives, Rent Collection and Sacrificial Fields.

==== Gate of Double Glory ====
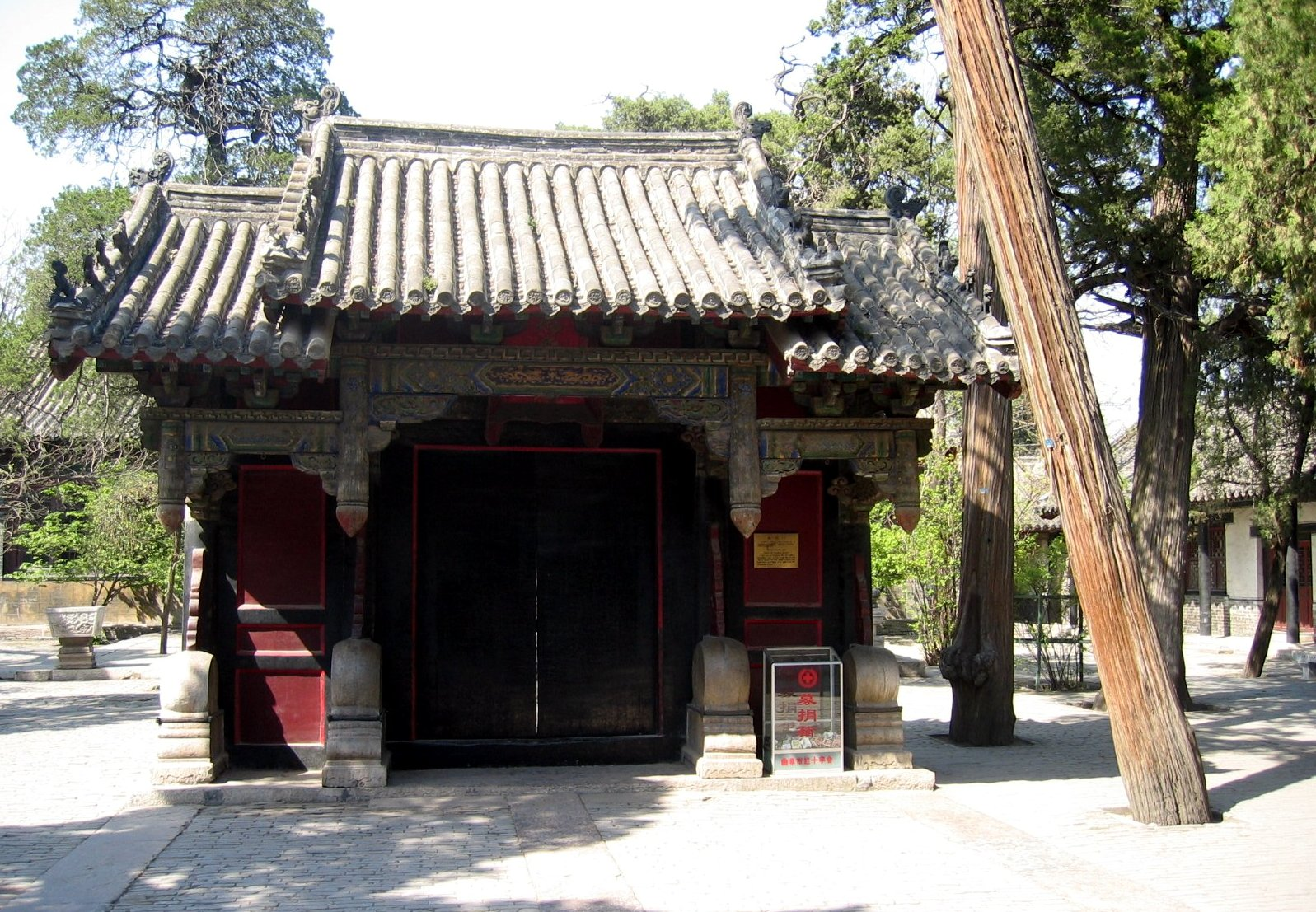
Gate of Double Glory

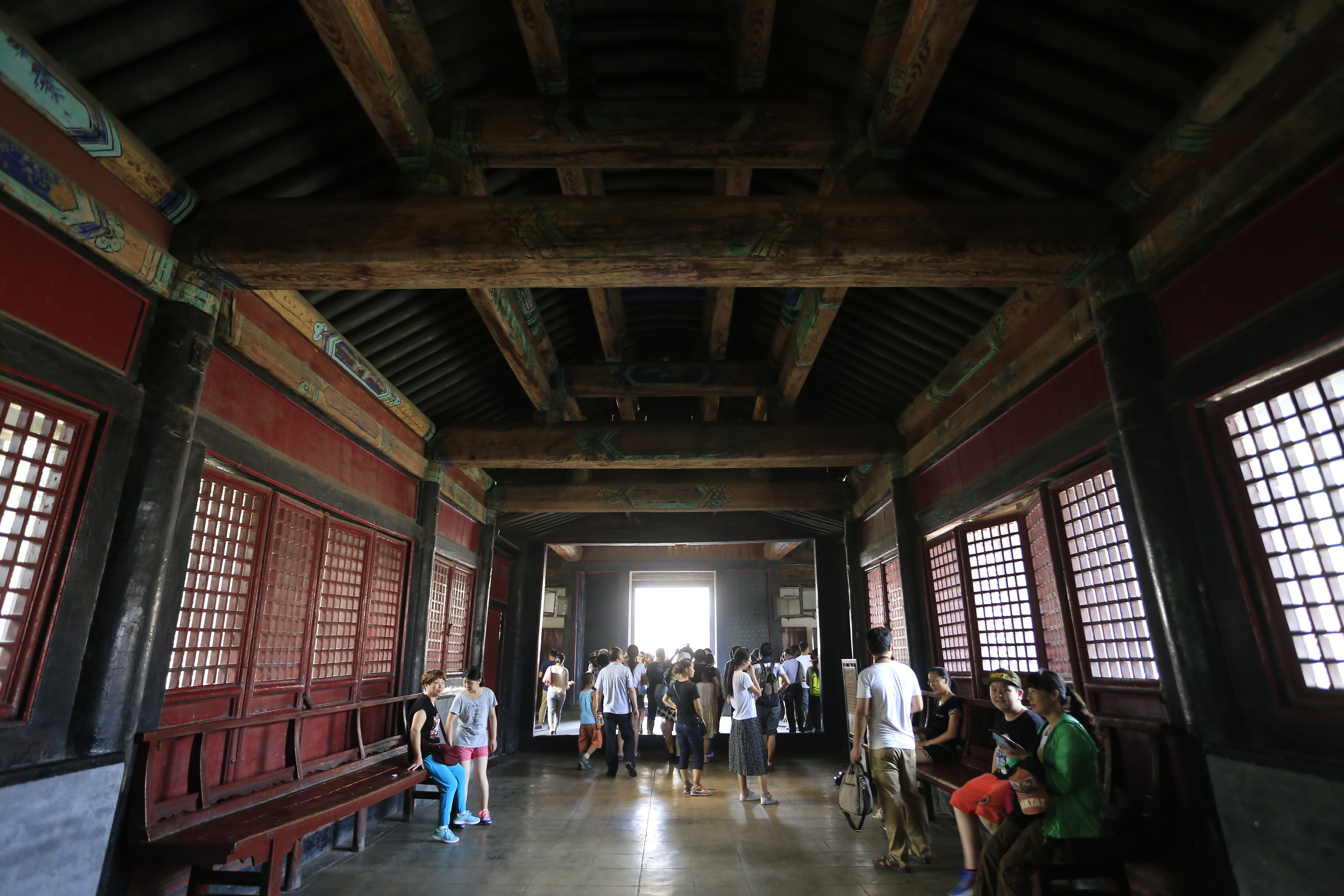
Corridor Hall

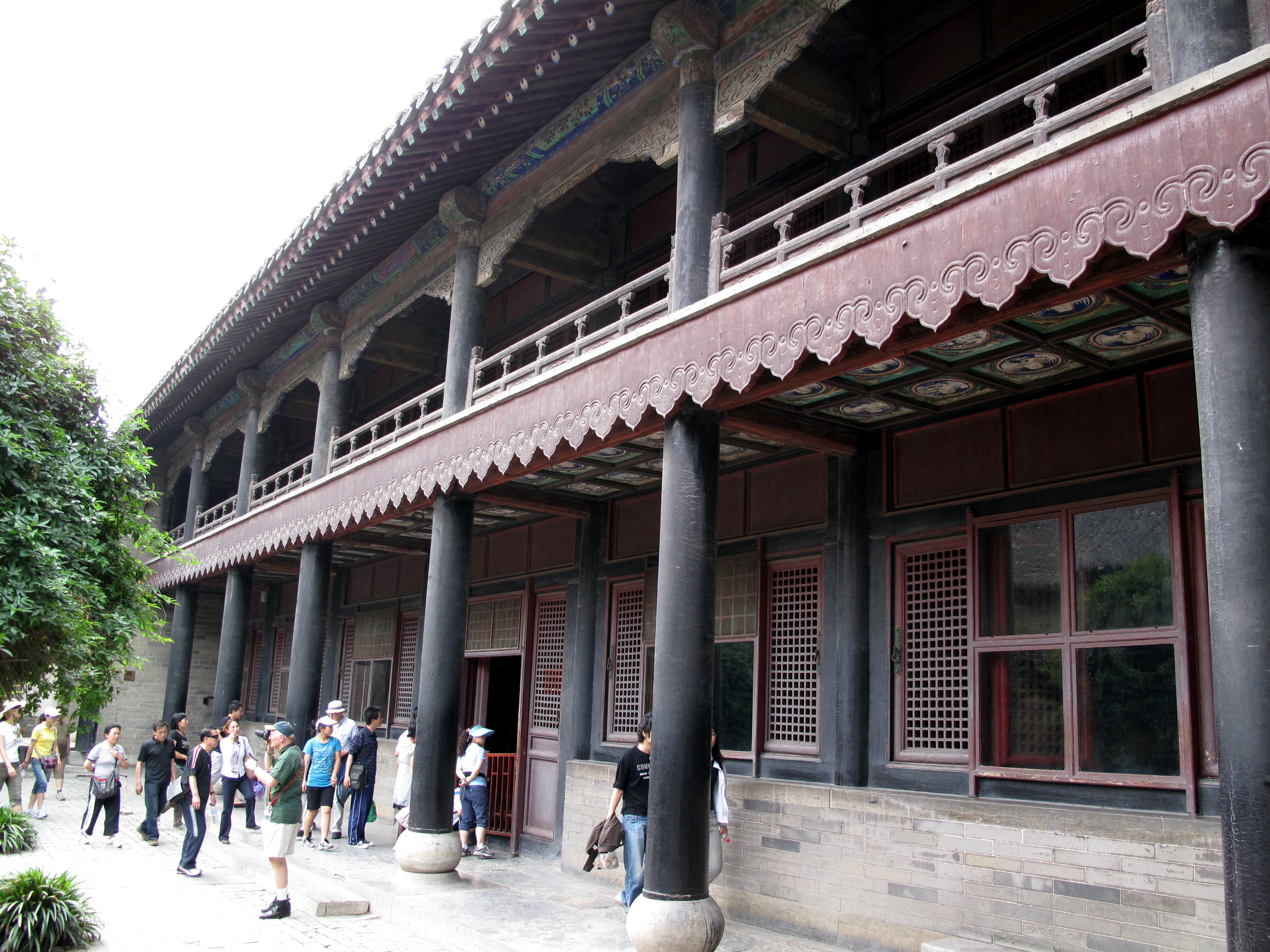
Rear Building

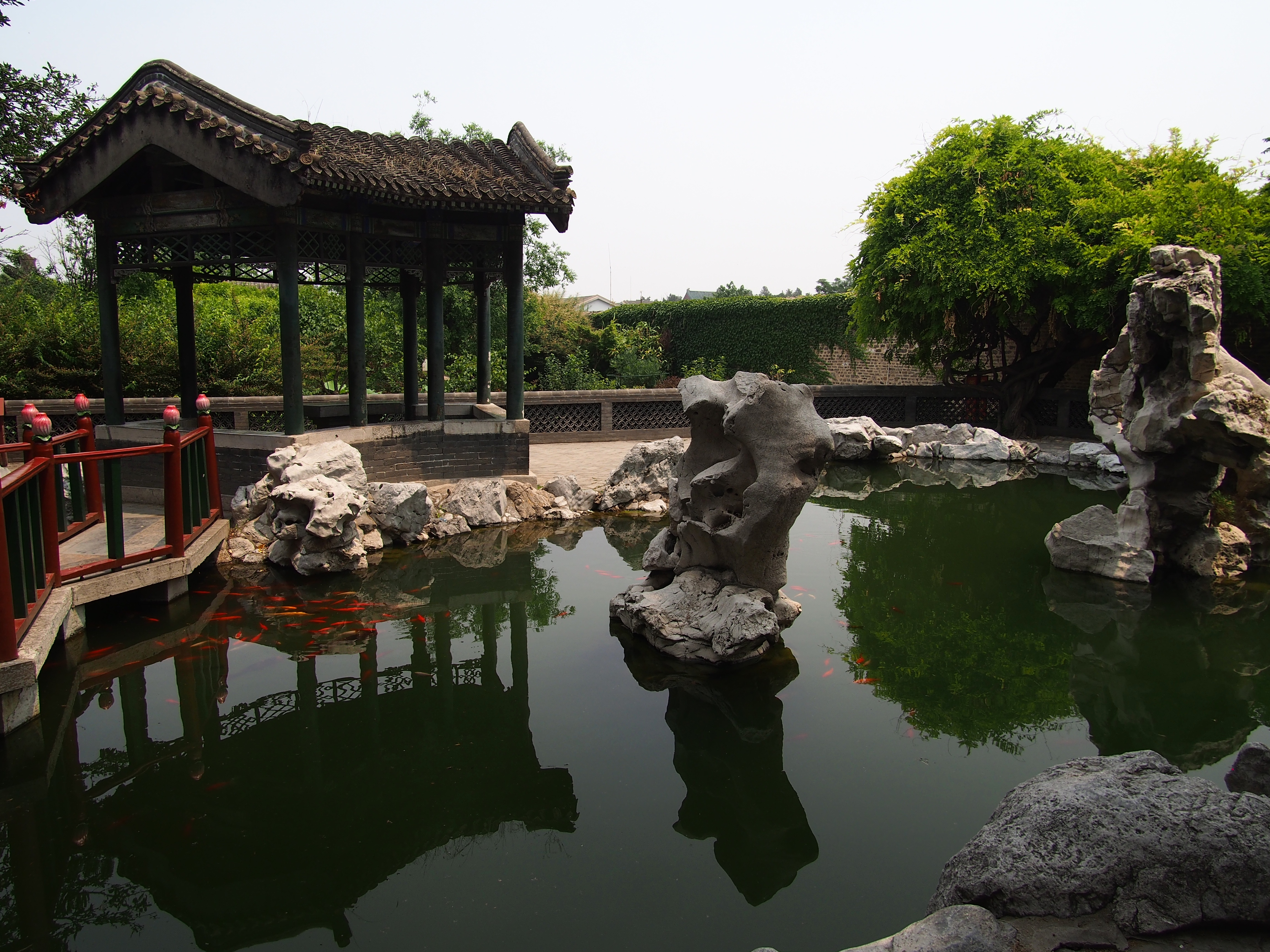
Back Garden

Located to the north of the Central Courtyard, the Gate of Double Glory (Chinese: 重光門; pinyin: Chóngguāng Mén) was erected in 1503 and opened only for ceremonial purposes, visits by the emperor, or the arrival of imperial edicts. The structure is 6.24 meters wide, 2.03 meters deep, and 5.95 meters in height. It is also known as the "Yi Gate" (Chinese: 儀門; pinyin: Yí Mén) or "Sai Gate" (Chinese: 塞門; pinyin: Sāi Mén).

==== Great Hall ====
The Great Hall (Chinese: 大堂; pinyin: Dà Táng) was the site of the duke's official business and the place for the proclamation of imperial edicts. When holding court, the duke was seated in the hall on a wooden chair that was covered by a tiger skin.

==== Second Hall ====
The Second Hall (Chinese: 二堂; pinyin: Èr Táng) was used for receiving high-ranking officials as well as for examinations in music and rites by the duke. It contains seven tablets inscribed by emperors, including one with the character "shou" (longevity) written by the Empress Dowager Cixi.

==== Third Hall ====
The Third Hall (Chinese: 三堂; pinyin: Sān Táng), also known as the "Hall of Withdrawal", was used by the duke for drinking tea.

=== Residential portion ===
==== Gate to the Inner Apartments ====
This gate (Chinese: 內宅門; pinyin: Nèizhái Mén) dates to the Ming dynasty. The gate building stands 11.8 meters wide, 6.1 meters deep, and 6.5 meters tall. During the residence of the Kong family, the gate was heavily guarded and restricted access to the residential portion of the mansion accessible only to the family and a small number of mostly female servants. Trespassing into the inner compound was punishable by death. Drinking water had to be delivered through a trough in the wall. On the internal ghost wall behind this entrance is a painting of a "tan" (tān), a mythical animal representing greed. Although the tan already has the Eight Treasures (associated with the Eight Immortals, it is still attempting to swallow the sun. The painting was placed at the exit from the inner apartments to the administrative portion to warn the members of the Kong family against greed in their business dealings outside.

==== Front Reception Hall ====
The Front Reception Hall (Chinese: 前上房; pinyin: Qiánshàng Fáng) is a structure with seven bays that was used for receiving relatives, banquets, marriage and funeral ceremonies.

==== Front Main Building ====
Built during the Qing era reconstruction after the fire of 1886, the Front Main Building (Chinese: 前堂樓; pinyin: Qiántáng Lóu) has two storeys and contained the private rooms of the wife and the concubines of the duke

==== Rear Building ====
The rear building (Chinese: 後堂樓; pinyin: Hòutáng Lóu) was erected during the reign of the Qing dynasty's Jiaqing Emperor. It has a floor space of 3900 square meters and contained the private rooms of the duke. The last duke to inhabit the Rear Building was Kong Decheng.

==== Rear Five Rooms ====
Originally a study for the duke, the rear five rooms (Chinese: 後五間; pinyin: Hòuwǔ Jiān) become a quarter for the maids of the residence during the late Qing dynasty.

==== Garden ====
The Back Garden (Chinese: 後花園; pinyin: Hòu Huāyuán) also known as the Tieshan Garden (Chinese: 鐵山園; pinyin: Tiěshān Yuán) was added during the Ming-era expansion of the mansion in 1503. The major building at the northern end of the garden is the Flower Hall (Chinese: 花廳; pinyin: Huā Tīng).

== See also ==
- Temple of Confucius, Qufu
- Cemetery of Confucius
- Mencius's sites – Meng family mansion 孟府, Temple of Mencius 孟廟, and Cemetery of Mencius 孟林.
- Temple of Yan Hui
- Temple of Zengzi 曾廟
- Former Residence of Zeng Guofan
