= Lingshan Islamic Cemetery =

Historic Muslim cemetery located in Quanzhou, China

- 灵山伊斯兰教圣墓
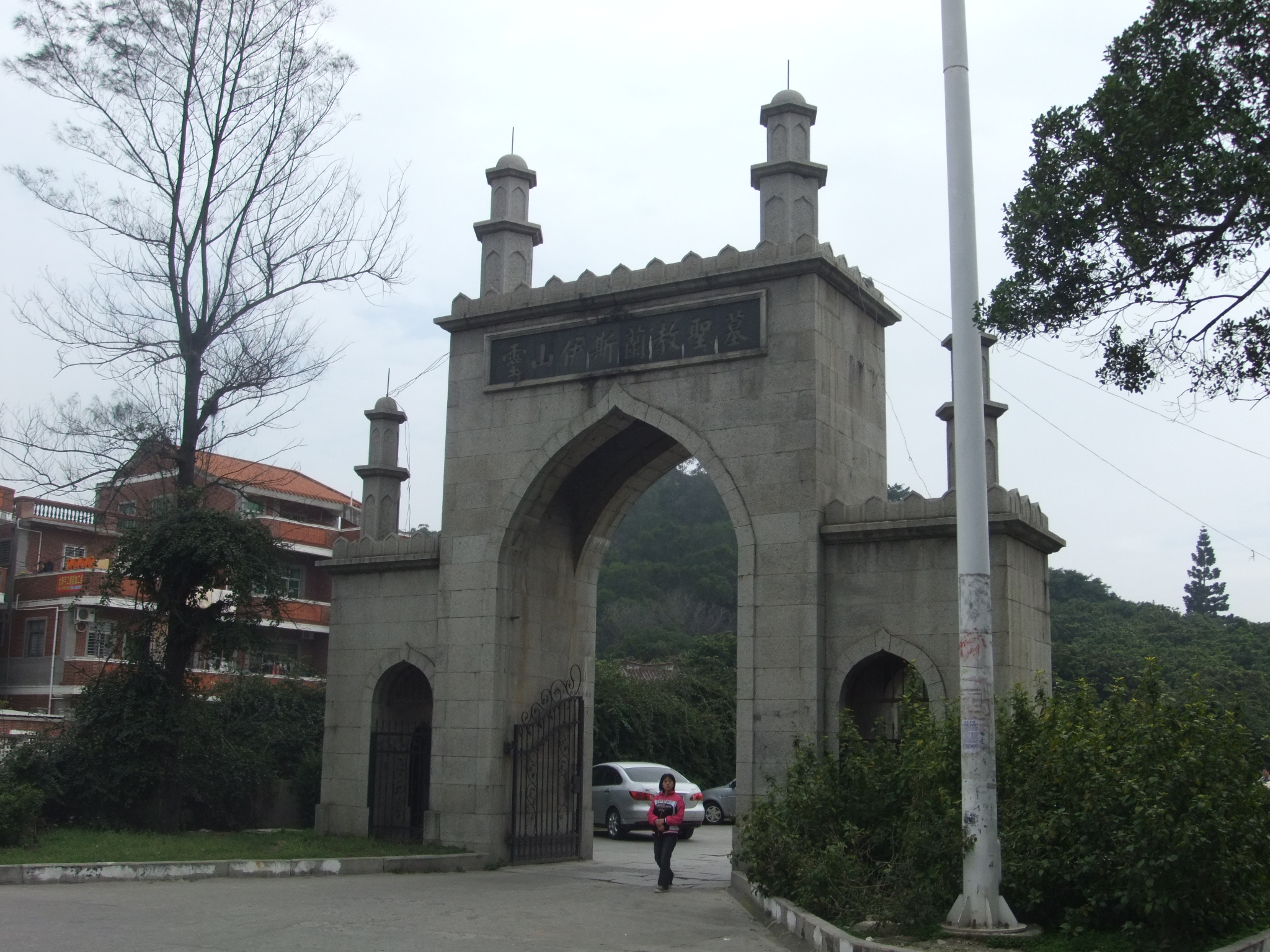
- Entrance to the cemetery

- Location within Fujian

General information
- Type: cemetery
- Location: Quanzhou, Fujian, China
- Coordinates: 24.906640°N 118.620580°E
- Renovated: 1962

The Lingshan Islamic Cemetery is located in the city of Quanzhou within the Fujian province of China. One of the oldest Islamic sites in China, the cemetery also contains a special burial ground that holds two venerated graves of two Muslim missionaries. The site was also visited by Zheng He in the 15th century.

== History ==
The cemetery had already existed in the 14th century, when a group of Arab Muslims arrived in 1323 to repair the two sacred tombs in the cemetery. In the year 1417, Chinese explorer Zheng He (who was probably a Muslim as well) visited the cemetery and left behind an altar, as well as a concrete stele detailing his visit of the site. In 1962, the cemetery received renovations including a reconstruction of the tombs of the two Arab missionaries.

== Holy Tombs ==
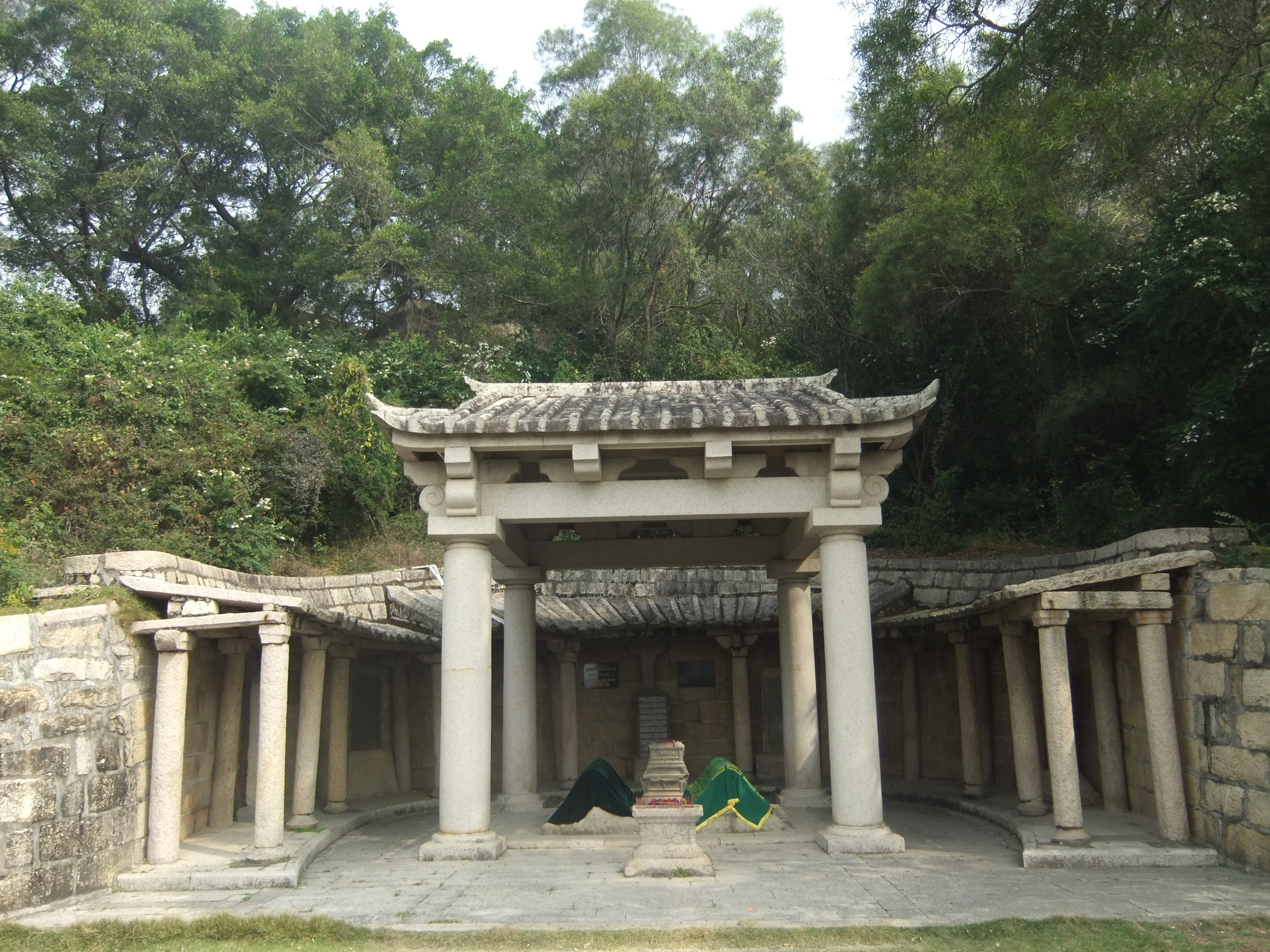
Holy Tombs burial site

A burial ground in the site known as the Holy Tombs holds the graves of two Arab missionaries, of whom their Chinese names are Sa-Ke-Zu and Wu-Ko-Shun and they were reportedly from the 7th century when Islam was in its early stages. The pagoda over their graves was reconstructed in 1962, although the tombs themselves have been repaired earlier in 1323 by Arab Muslim immigrants. The burial ground of Holy Tombs was designated as a cultural heritage monument of China in 1988.

=== Controversy ===
The authenticity of the tombs belonging to two 7th-century Arab Muslim missionaries has been contested, as the Islamic prophet Muhammad was only in his teenage years during the time the missionaries reportedly arrived in China, dated to the 610s.

=== Gallery ===
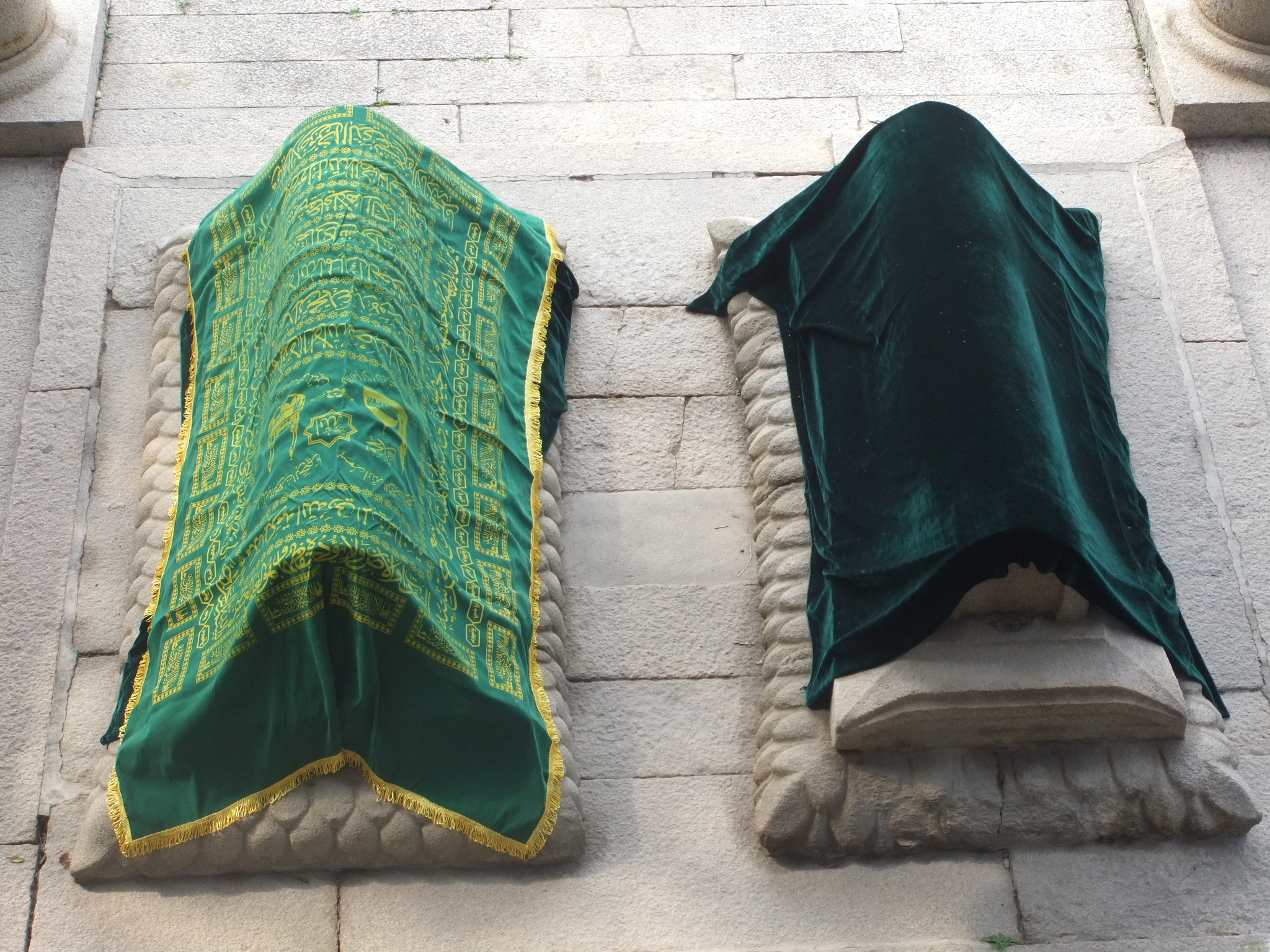
The tombs of the two missionaries, covered by silk cloth

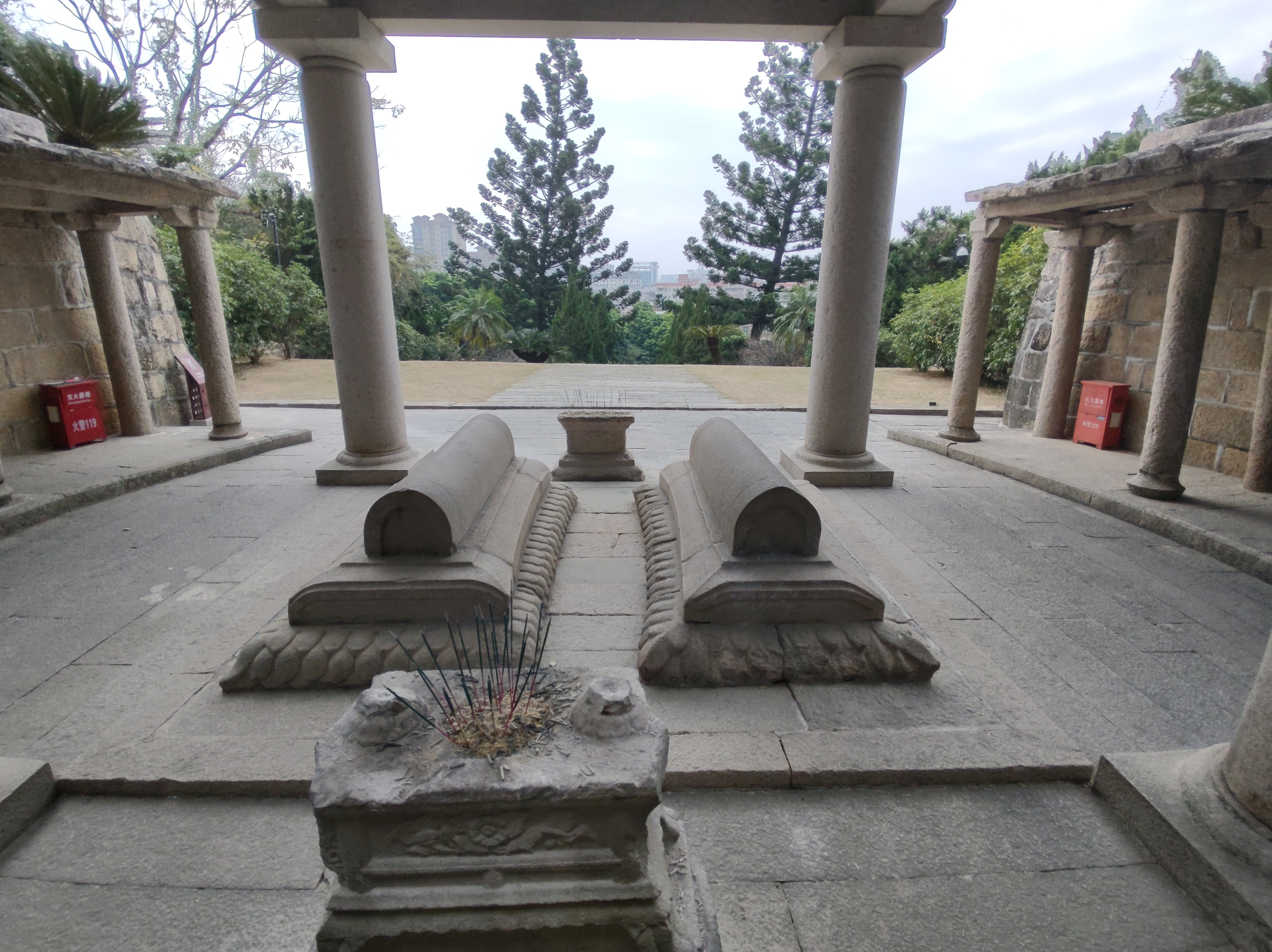
The tombs, but without the silk cloth covering them

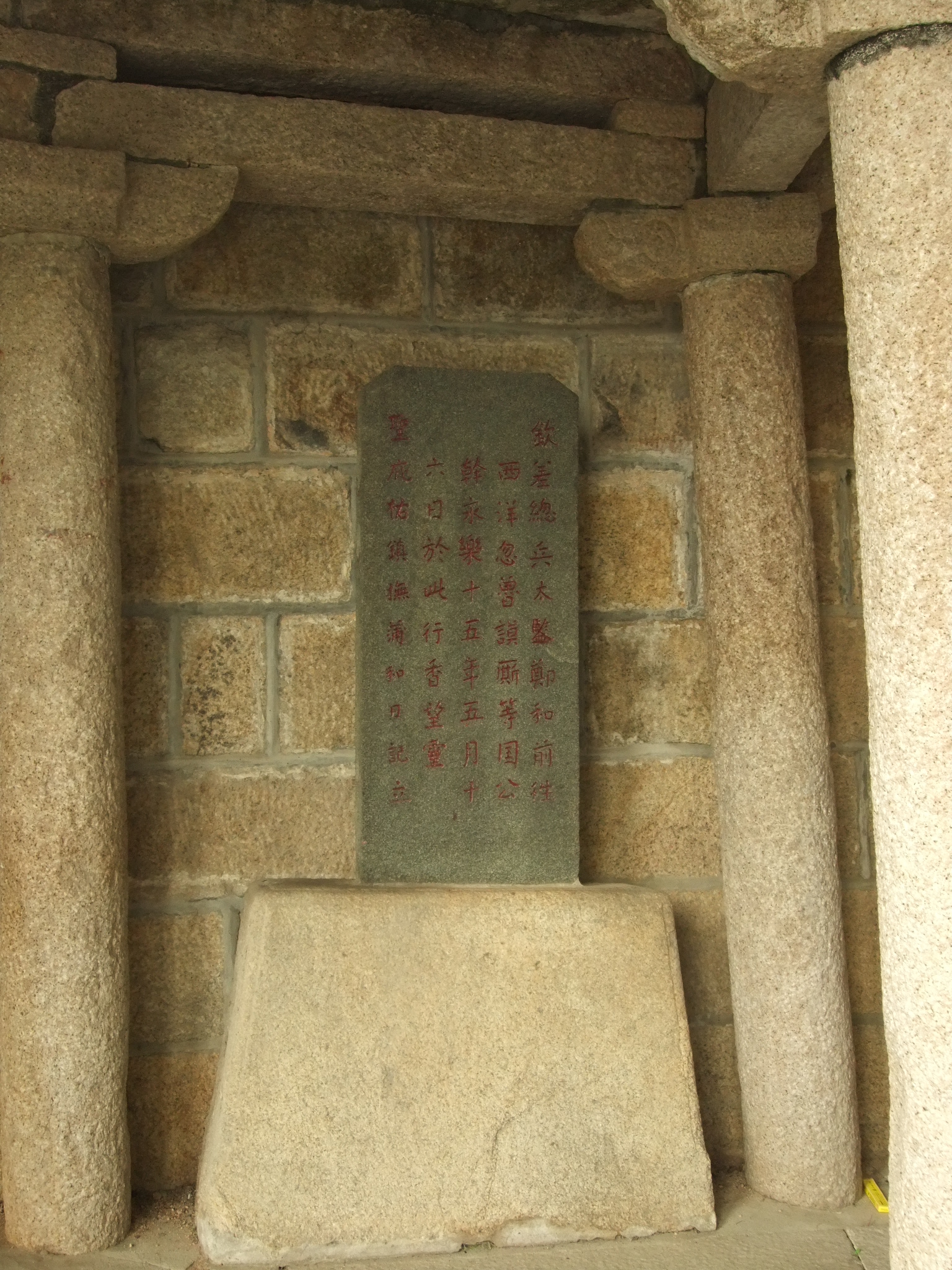
The concrete stele which was inscribed by Zheng He in 1417

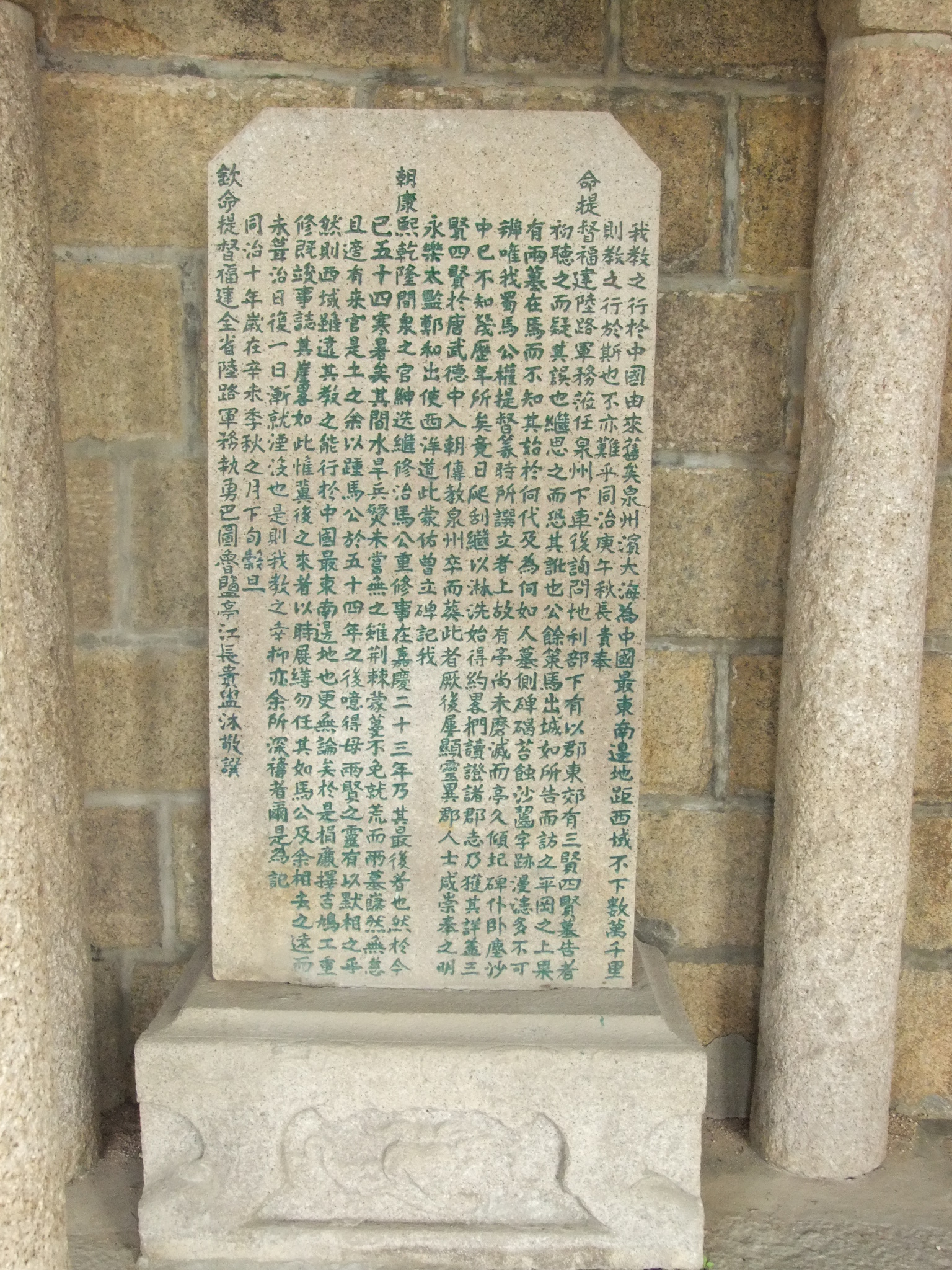
A stele which was inscribed during the Qing dynasty period, describing a renovation which happened during that time

== Other burials ==
Aside from Muslims, the Lingshan Islamic Cemetery also has burial plots for Buddhist and Christian individuals.

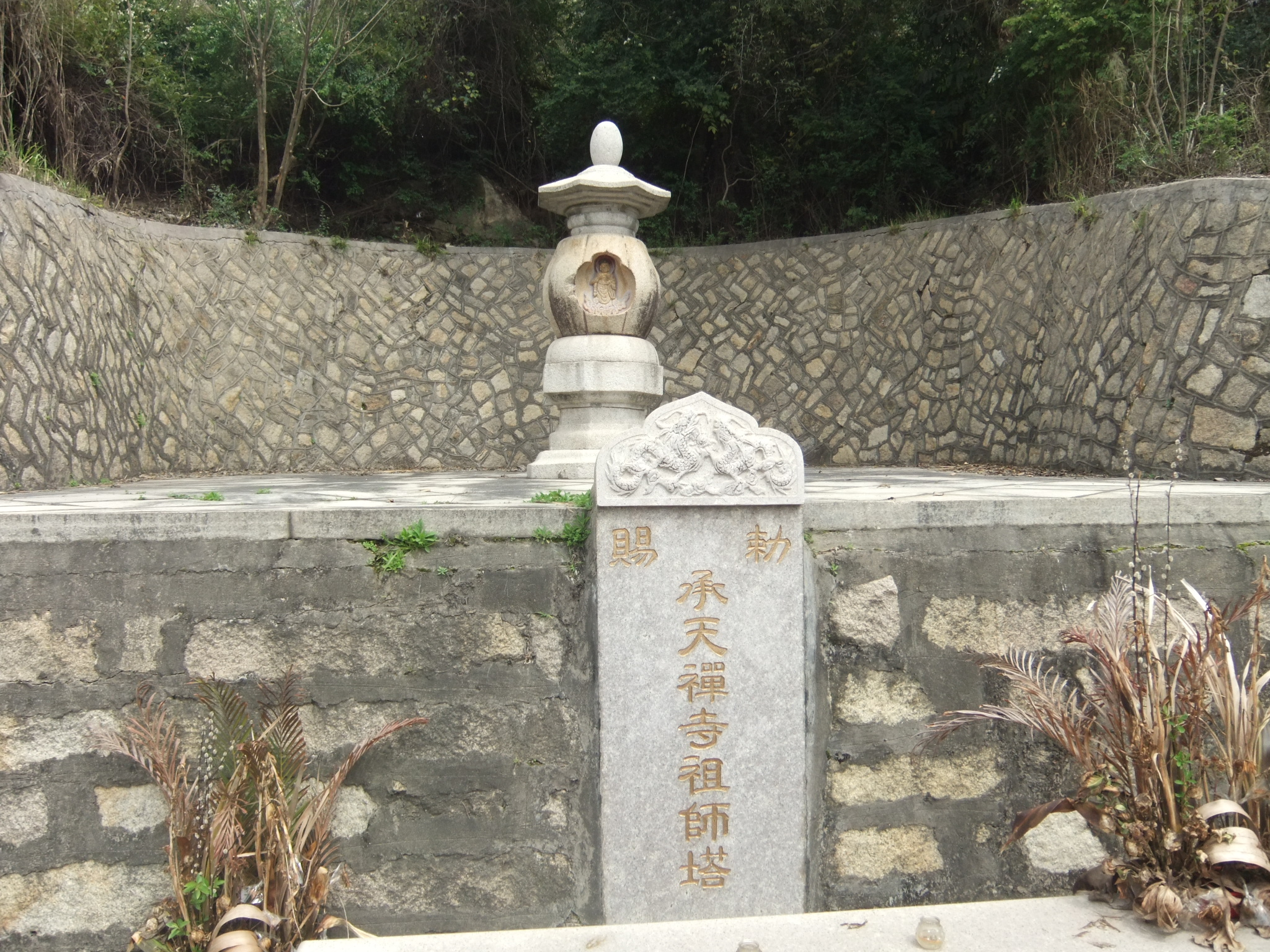
A Buddhist grave in the cemetery, containing the remains of a temple priest

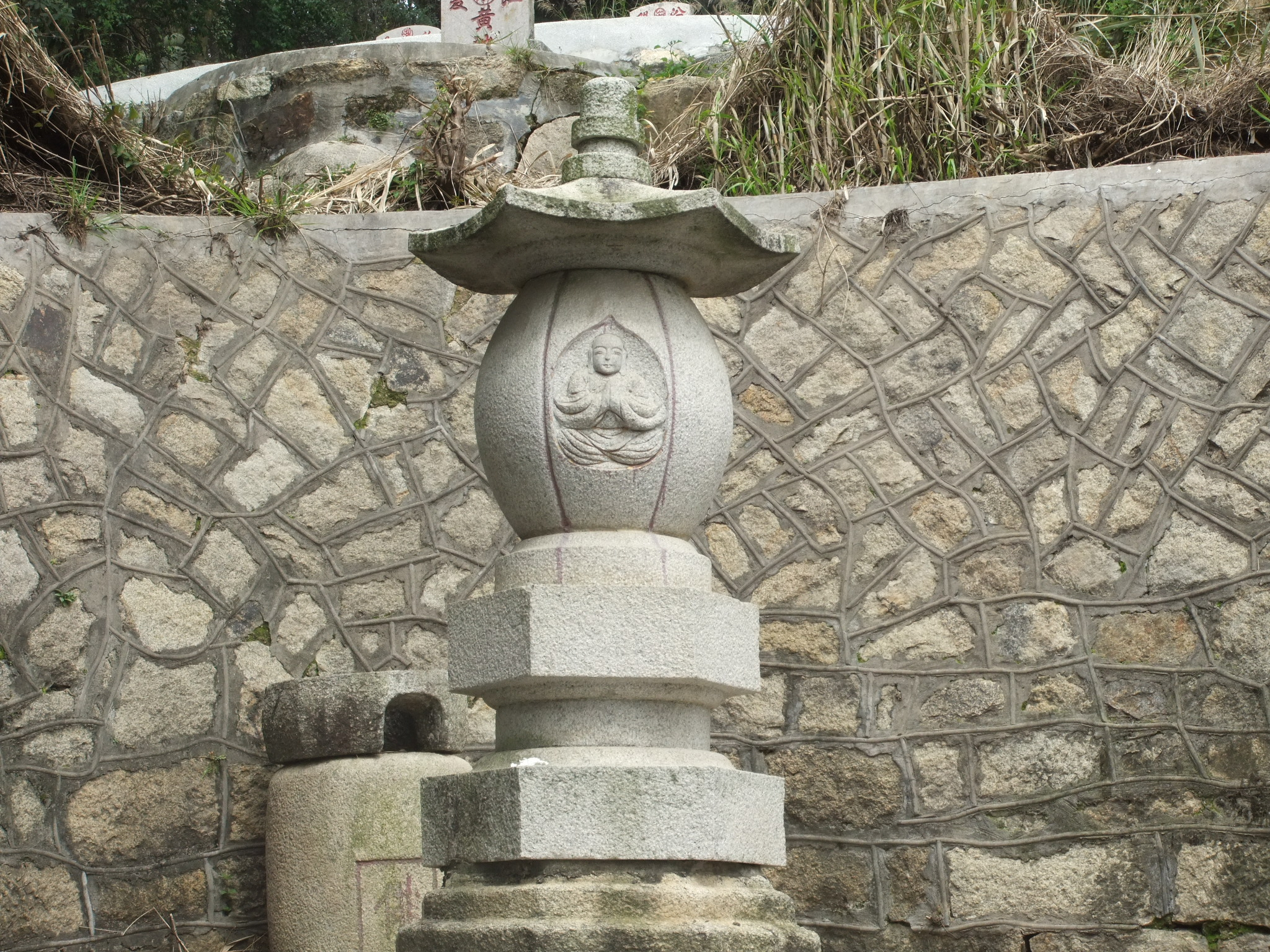
A closeup on the same Buddhist grave's tombstone, showing a sculpted image of Gautama Buddha in meditation

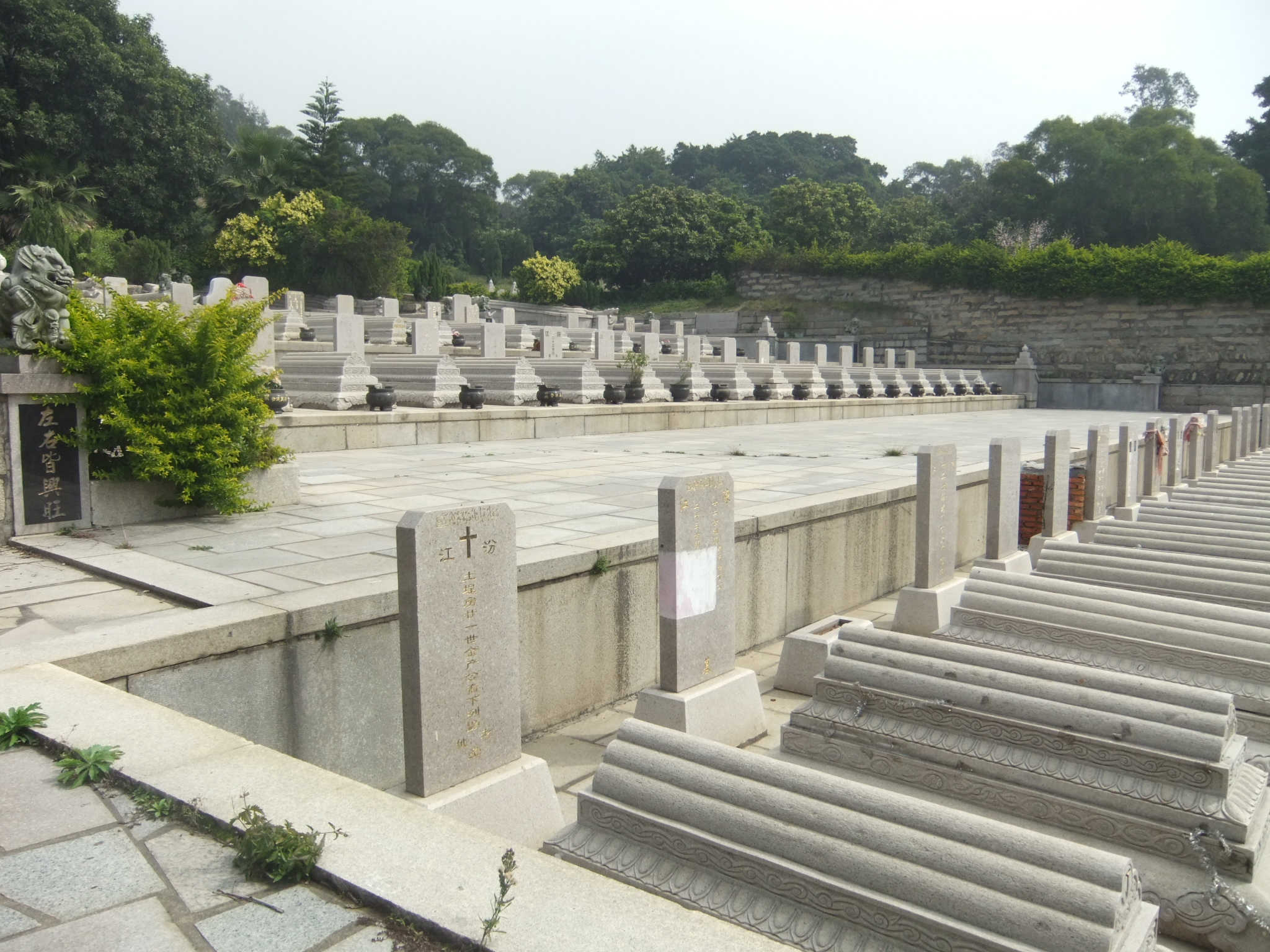
Christian graves in the cemetery

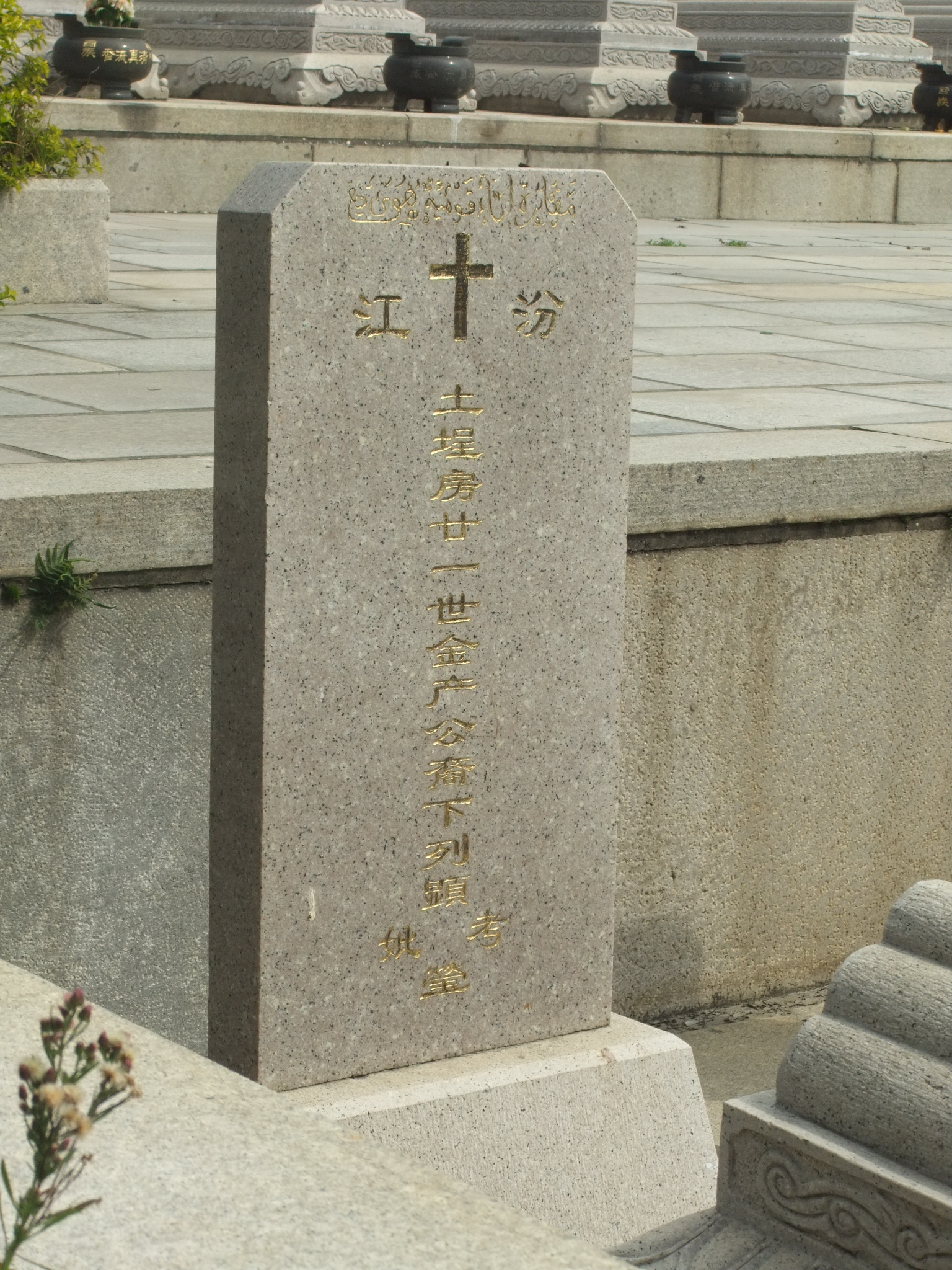
One of the Christian graves, dedicated to a certain individual named Jiang Shi Fen, who is in the 21st generation of his clan. Note the Arabic calligraphy on top of the cross inscription, both are in gold.

=== Turtle tombs ===
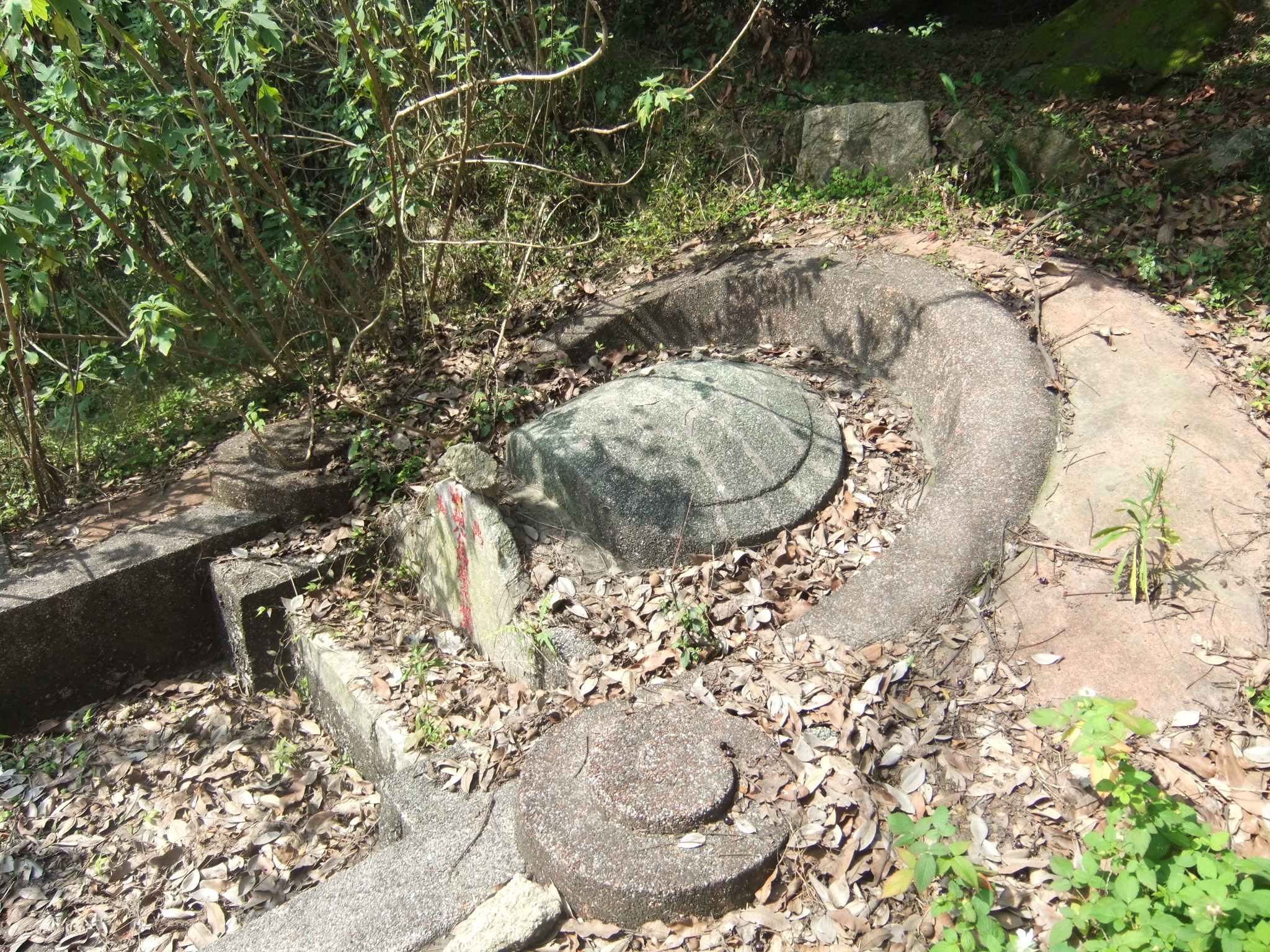
One of such graves with turtle-shell tombstones

Some of the graves in the cemetery have tombstones that are based on turtle shells.

== See also ==
- Islam in China
- List of cemeteries in China
