= Nee =

Nee or NEE may refer to:

== Names ==
- Née (lit. 'born'), a woman's family name at birth before the adoption of another surname usually after marriage
  - The male equivalent "né" is used to indicate what a man was originally known as before the adoption of a different name.
- Nee (surname)
- Ni (surname), also romanized as Nee

== Film ==
- Nee (film), a 1966 Indian Tamil film

== Music ==
- Nee (band), a Kannada band
- "Nee" (Yōko Oginome song), a 1991 song by Yōko Oginome
- "Nee" (Perfume song), a 2010 song by Perfume
- "Nee?", a 2003 song by Aya Matsuura

== Abbreviations and acronyms ==
- Net Ecosystem Exchange, a measurement of carbon uptake
- NEE, a political party in Flanders, Belgium
- Newly emerging economy, a term for the economy of a developing country
- Ethinylestradiol/norethisterone, an oral contraceptive
- NextEra Energy, a United States company having the stock symbol NEE
- Named-entity extraction in natural language processing
- North East England, region of the UK

== See also ==
- Ni (disambiguation)
- Knee (disambiguation)
