= Niy =

Niy or niy can refer to:

- Ngiti language, a language spoken in the Democratic Republic of the Congo, by ISO 639-3 code
- Niya Kingdom (also spelled "Niy"), an ancient kingdom in Syria mentioned around the 14th century BCE
- NiY, one of the nickel compounds in chemistry
- Niy, a place where ancient Egyptian pharaoh Thutmose I was said to have gone elephant hunting

== See also ==
- NI (disambiguation)
- Knee (disambiguation)
- NY (disambiguation)
