= Wounded =

Wounded may refer to:

== Film and television ==
- Wounded (1997 film), a Canadian film of 1997
- Wounded (2007 film), a Bollywood film
- Wounded (2013 film), a Spanish film
- Wounded (play), a 2005 stage play collaboratively developed by the Los Angeles Theatre Ensemble
- "The Wounded" (Star Trek: The Next Generation), a 1991 TV episode

== Music ==
- The Wounded (band), a Dutch gothic rock nand
- Wounded (Enchant album), 1996
- Wounded (Landmine Marathon album), 2006
- "Wounded", a song by Third Eye Blind from Blue, 1999
- "Wounded", a song by Nik Kershaw from To Be Frank, 2001

== See also ==
- Wound (disambiguation)
- Wounded Knee (disambiguation)
