= Wind-up =

Wind-up or windup may refer to:

- Windup, a pitching position in baseball
- "Wind Up", a 1971 song from Aqualung (Jethro Tull album)
- "Wind Up", a 1997 song by Foo Fighters from The Colour and the Shape
- "Wind Up", a 2001 song by Thursday from Full Collapse
- "Wind Up", a 2026 song by NCT JNJM from Both Sides
- Windup radio, a clockwork radio powered by human muscle action
- Wind-up Records, a New York music label
- Wind-up toy, a toy powered by a wound clockwork motor
- Winding-up, liquidation of a company
- Integral windup, an error condition in a proportional–integral–derivative controller
- Pain wind-up, an increase in pain intensity caused by repeated stimulation
- "She's a Windup", a 1977 song by Dr. Feelgood
- The Wind-Up Bird Chronicle, a 1994 Japanese novel by Haruki Murakami

== See also ==
- Wind (disambiguation)
- Wind It Up (disambiguation)
- Wound (disambiguation)
