= On My Knees =

On My Knees may refer to:

- "On My Knees" (The 411 song), 2004
- "On My Knees" (Charlie Rich song), 1978
- "On My Knees" (Jaci Velasquez song), 1997
- "On My Knees" (Rüfüs Du Sol song), 2021
- "On My Knees", a song by Middle Kids from Lost Friends, 2018
- "On My Knees", a song by Unkle featuring Michael Kiwanuka from the Roma film soundtrack, 2018

== See also ==
- Knee (disambiguation)
