= Ni =

Ni, NI or N-I may refer to:

== Arts and entertainment ==
- Ni, or Nishada, the seventh note of the Indian musical scale in raga
- New Internationalist, a magazine
- Knights Who Say "Ni!", characters from the film Monty Python and the Holy Grail

== Businesses ==
- National Instruments, a U.S. producer of automated test equipment and virtual instrumentation software
- National Insurance, a system of taxes and related social security benefits in the United Kingdom
- Native Instruments, a music software production company
- News UK, formerly News International, a British newspaper publisher
- Portugália airline (IATA code NI)

== Language ==
- Ni (letter), or Nu, a letter in the Greek alphabet: uppercase Ν, lowercase ν
- Ni (kana), romanisation of the Japanese kana に and ニ
- Ni (cuneiform), a sign in cuneiform writing

== Names ==
- Ni (surname) (倪), a Chinese surname
- Ní, a surname prefix from the shortened form of the Irish word for a daughter
- Ni, female prefix to some Balinese names

== Places ==
- Ni River (New Caledonia), a river of New Caledonia
- Ni River (Virginia), a tributary of the Mattaponi River
- Mount Ni, a hill in Shandong, China
- Nicaragua (ISO 3166 NI)
  - .ni, Nicaragua's internet domain
- Norfolk Island, an external territory of Australia
- North Island, one of the two main islands of New Zealand
- Northern Ireland, a constituent country of the United Kingdom
- Lower Saxony (German: Niedersachsen; ISO 3166 code DE-NI), a state of Germany

== Science and technology ==
- Nickel, symbol Ni, a chemical element
- Ampere-turns, sometimes abbreviated NI
- Natural insemination i.e. sexual intercourse, in contrast to artificial insemination
- Nitrogen Triiodide, a sensitive contact explosive
- Natural intelligence, a term used to contrast intelligence found in nature, particularly in man, from artificial intelligence
- Neonatal isoerythrolysis, a disease when the mother has antibodies against the blood type of the newborn

== Other uses ==
- NI tank, a Russian military vehicle
- N-I (rocket), a Japanese rocket based on the U.S. Delta/Thor family
- Nishan-e-Imtiaz, a Pakistani civilian decoration
- Nishan-e-Iqbal, a decoration awarded by the Royal House of Rampur, India
- Non-Inscrits (NI), members of the European Parliament not enrolled in any political group of the European Parliament
- Nuevas Ideas (NI), a Salvadoran political party
- Introverted intuition, one of eight cognitive functions postulated by the Myers–Briggs Type Indicator

== See also ==
- Nee (disambiguation)
- NL (disambiguation)
- N1 (disambiguation)
