= Wind (disambiguation) =

Wind is the movement of air.

Wind or Winds may also refer to:

== People with the surname ==
- Wind (surname)
- Alex Wind (born 2001), American gun control activist
- Edmund De Wind (1883–1918), Canadian/Irish war hero
- Edgar Wind (1900–1971), British historian
- Hans Wind (1919–1995), World War II flying ace

== Arts, entertainment, and media ==
=== Music ===
==== Groups ====
- Wind (band), a German musical group created in 1985
- Winds (band), a Norwegian progressive metal band formed in 1998
- w-inds., a J-Pop vocal group, formed in 2001

==== Musical instruments ====
- Wind instrument
  - Woodwind instrument

==== Songs ====
- "Wind", a song by Akeboshi
- "Wind", a 2017 song by Monni from Analog Melody
- "The Winds", a 1960 song by Maurice Williams and the Zodiacs from their album Stay with Maurice Williams & The Zodiacs

=== Other uses in arts, entertainment, and media ===
- WIND (AM), a radio station in Chicago
- Wind (1992 film), a 1992 film about the America's Cup series of yachting races
- Wind (2019 film), an American animated short film
- Wind: A Breath of Heart, a 2002 visual novel
- "Wind", a speaking track from The Wiggles' 1991 debut album
- Pokémon Winds and Waves, a pair of upcoming 2027 video games

== Brands and enterprises ==
- Wind Telecomunicazioni, a mobile telephone carrier in Italy (merged in 2016 with 3 Italy into Wind Tre)
- Wind Hellas, a mobile telephone carrier in Greece
- Wind Mobile, a mobile telephone carrier in Canada, now Freedom Mobile
- Wind Telecom, a telecommunications holding company in Italy
- Wind Telecom (Dominican Republic), a telecommunications provider in the Dominican Republic
- Wind Tre, a fixed and mobile telephone carrier in Italy
- Renault Wind, a roadster by French automobile manufacturer Renault

== Computing and technology ==
- MSI Wind Netbook
- MSI Wind PC

== Science and healthcare ==
- WIND (spacecraft), a NASA spacecraft launched in 1994 to study solar wind
- Flatulence, or passing wind, or passing gas
- Wind power, use of wind as a source of energy
- Planetary wind, the outgassing of light chemical elements from a planet's atmosphere into space
- Solar wind, a stream of charged particles ejected from the sun

== Other uses ==
- Wind River Range, or "the Winds", in Wyoming
- Wind (Miami), a skyscraper in Miami
- Wind god, or the winds, deities representing wind

== See also ==
- The Wind (disambiguation)
- Wind-up (disambiguation)
- Winded
- Winding (disambiguation)
- Wound (disambiguation)
