= Ngai (surname) =

Chinese family surname

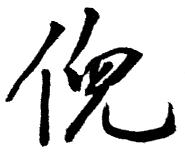
Ngai (third character), written in Chinese running-hand calligraphy

Ngai is the transliteration of three Chinese surnames in Hong Kong based on Cantonese:

- 魏, also common in northern China as Wei (pinyin: Wèi)
- 危, pinyin: Wēi
- 倪, pinyin: Ní

All three characters are written the same way in both traditional and simplified writing systems.

== See also ==
- Wei (surname)
- Ni (surname)
