= Winding (disambiguation) =

Winding is a common name for an electromagnetic coil.

Winding may also refer to:

People with the name Winding:

- Alberte Winding (born 1963), Danish singer and actress
- Andréas Winding (1928–1977), French cinematographer
- August Winding (1835–1899), Danish pianist and composer
- Johannes Winding Harbitz (1831–1917), Norwegian politician
- Kai Winding (1922–1983), Danish trombonist and jazz composer
- Nicolas Winding Refn (born 1970), Danish filmmaker
- Romain Winding (born 1951), French cinematographer
- Victor Winding (1929–2014), British actor

Other uses:

- Winding number, an integer representing the total number of times that a curve travels counterclockwise around a point
- Winding hole, a widened section of canal used for turning boats
- Winding, the lowering and raising of men and equipment in mining
- Getting the wind knocked out of you

== See also ==
- Wind (disambiguation)
- Wound (disambiguation)
- Wingdings
