= 1N =

1N or 1-N may refer to:

- 1st parallel north
- Canon EOS-1N
- Bell UH-1N Twin Huey, part of the U.S. Marine H-1 upgrade program
- Canon F-1n, a model of Canon F-1
- Olympus OM-1n, a model of Olympus OM-1
- SH 1N, the North Island section of New Zealand State Highway 1
- 1N, a model of Toyota N engine
- UH-1N Huey, see Bell UH-1 Iroquois
- Secondary State Highway 1N (Washington 1937-1943), a loop west of Centralia
- Secondary State Highway 1N (Washington 1943–1970), now Washington State Route 507 from Centralia to Tenino
- CUH-1N, Canadian version of what became the Bell 212
- Sikorsky HSS-1N Seabat, see Sikorsky H-34
- F7F-1N, see Grumman F7F Tigercat
- F8F-1N Bearcat, see Grumman F8F Bearcat
- XF8F-1N, see Grumman F8F Bearcat
- J/1N Alpha, see Auster Autocrat
- One newton, see Newton (unit)

== See also ==
- N1 (disambiguation)
