= Nee (surname) =

Nee or Née is a surname. Notable people with the surname include:

- Ashley Nee (born 1989), American slalom canoeist
- Chris Nee, creator of Doc McStuffins
- Danny Nee, basketball coach
- Frédéric Née (born 1975), French football striker
- George H. Nee, American Medal of Honor recipient
- Luis Née (fl. 1789–1794), Franco-Spanish botanist
- Watchman Nee (1903–1972), Chinese Christian leader

== See also ==
- Ni (surname) (倪), sometimes transliterated as Nee
