= The Wind =

The Wind may refer to:

== Poetry and literature ==
- "The Wind" (poem), a 14th-century poem by Dafydd ap Gwilym
- "The Wind", a 1943 short story by Ray Bradbury appearing in Dark Carnival
- The Wind (novel), a 1925 supernatural novel by Dorothy Scarborough

== Films ==
- The Wind (1928 film), starring Lillian Gish, based on the novel
- The Wind (1934 film), a Chinese silent film
- The Wind (1982 film), a Malian film
- The Wind (1986 film), an American horror film
- The Wind (2018 film), an American western horror film

== Music ==
- The Wind (South Korean band)
- Der Wind, ballet pantomime composition by Franz Schreker

=== Albums ===
- The Wind (Warren Zevon album), 2003
- The Wind (Kayhan Kalhor and Erdal Erzincan album), 2006
- The Wind, a 2021 album by Balmorhea

=== Songs ===
- "The Wind", a song by Cat Stevens on his 1971 album Teaser and the Firecat
- "The Wind", a song by PJ Harvey on her 1998 album "Is This Desire?"
- "The Wind", a song by Russ Freeman, also performed by Chet Baker, Keith Jarrett and Mariah Carey
- "The Wind" (Nolan Strong & The Diablos song)
- "The Wind" (Zac Brown Band song)
- "The Wind", a song by Kabir Suman on his 2003 album Reaching Out
- "The Wind", a song by Amos Lee on his 2006 album Supply and Demand
- "The Wind", a song by Demon Hunter on the 2010 Christmas compilation Happy Christmas Vol. 5
- "The Wind", a song by the Fray on their 2012 album Scars & Stories
- "The Wind", a song by Amorphis on their 2015 album Under the Red Cloud

== See also ==
- Wind (disambiguation)
