= N1 =

N1, N.I, N-1, N=1, or N01 may refer to:

== Information technology ==
- Nokia N1, an Android tablet
- Nexus One, an Android phone made by HTC
- Nylas N1, a desktop email client
- Oppo N1, an Android phone
- N1, a Sun Microsystems software brand now mostly integrated into Sun Ops Center
- N1 Grid Engine, older name for Sun Grid Engine
- Nvidia N1 and N1X SoCs

== Popular culture ==
- Naboo N-1 Starfighter, a spacecraft from the Star Wars fictional universe
- Internet slang for "nice one"
- Network One, a defunct American broadcast television network
- Nippon Ichi, also known as N1, a Japanese developer and publisher of game software

== Science ==
- N-of-1 trial
- N1 (also called N100), an evoked potential over the human brain
- N1 ring, a term used in mathematics
- A non-small cell lung carcinoma staging code for Metastasis to ipsilateral peribronchial or ipsilateral hilar lymph nodes
- Visual N1, a human brain evoked potential response
- N01, Nephritic syndrome ICD-10 code
- ATC code N01 Anesthetics, a subgroup of the Anatomical Therapeutic Chemical Classification System

== Technology ==
- N-1 contingency planning, a planning for a single major failure in an electrical grid

== Vehicles ==
- USS N-1 (SS-53), a 1915 coastal defense submarine of the United States Navy
- A type of light commercial vehicle
- N_{1}, gauges in that monitor the low-pressure compressor section of a jet engine
- Neta N01, a subcompact battery electric crossover SUV

=== Airplanes ===
- AEG N.I, a German World War I night bomber
- Caproni Campini N.1, a 1940 early motorjet-powered test airplane
- Naval Aircraft Factory N-1, a 1918 United States Navy maritime patrol aircraft
- Northrop N-1, proposed flying wing medium bomber
- Northrop N-1M, research aircraft built as a flying mockup of the Northrop N-1

=== Locomotives ===
- GNR Class N1, a British 0-6-2T steam locomotive class classified N1 under both GNR and LNER ownership
- PRR N1s, a type of steam locomotive
- SECR N1 class, a British 2-6-0 steam locomotive class
- VR Class Pr1 (original classification N1), a Finnish steam locomotive

=== Rockets ===
- N1 (rocket), a Soviet rocket
- N-I rocket, a Japanese rocket

== Other uses ==
- N1 (company), an Icelandic gasoline/convenience store chain
- N1 (TV channel), a cable TV news channel operating in Western Balkans
- N1 (Long Island bus)
- N1, a district in the N postcode area in North London, England
- N.1 (David Carreira album), 2011
- Nebraska Highway 1, a state highway in Nebraska, U.S.
- Carretera Central (Cuba), a state highway of Cuba, numbered N–1
- London Buses route N1

== See also ==
- List of N1 roads
- Bessel's correction, the use of n − 1 instead of n in the formula for the sample variance and sample standard deviation
- 1N (disambiguation)
- Number One (disambiguation)
- NI (disambiguation)
- NL (disambiguation)
