= NL =

NL may stand for:

== Businesses and organizations ==
- New Left (Polish: Nowa Lewica), a Polish left-wing party
- National League, one of two leagues in Major League Baseball
- Shaheen Air (IATA airline designator: NL)

== Computing ==
- Nested loop, one loop within another, for example, as needed for NL-Join
- .nl, the Internet country code top-level domain for the Netherlands
- NL (complexity), a computational complexity class
- nl (format), a file format for presenting mathematical programming problems
- nl (Unix), a Unix utility for numbering lines
- Newline, a special character in computing signifying the end of a line of text

== Places ==
- Nagaland, a state of India
- Netherlands (ISO 3166-1 alpha-2 country code: NL)
- Newfoundland and Labrador, a Canadian province (Canadian postal abbreviation: NL)
- North Lanarkshire, a council area of Scotland
- Nuevo León, a northeastern Mexican state

== Other uses ==
- Dutch language (ISO 639-2 alpha-2 language code: nl)
- National Lifeguard, a Canadian lifeguarding course and certificate
- No liability, an Australian form of limited liability company
- Northern League (New Zealand)
- Northernlion, a Canadian Twitch streamer and YouTuber

== See also ==
- nI (disambiguation)
- n1 (disambiguation)
