= Yan Zhengzai =

Confucius' mother

- 顏徵在
- Born: 568 BC
- Died: 535 BC; Queli, State of Lu
- Resting place: Cemetery of Duke Liang, State of Lu
- Spouse: Shuliang He
- Children: Confucius (son)
- Father: Yan Xiang
- Relatives: Kong Pi (stepson)

Yan Zhengzai (568 BC – 535 BC) was the third daughter of Yan Xiang and the mother of Confucius.

== Life ==
=== Kong He's family ===
Kong He, known as Shuliang He, married his first wife Lady Shi. She gave birth to nine daughters but no sons. Later, he married a concubine and gave birth to a son, called Kong Pi, courtesy name Meng Pi, who was said to have deformities in his feet and could not become his father's heir.

=== Marriage ===
Anxious for a son, the aged Shuliang He approached the father of the Yan family for a marriage to one of his daughters. Yan Xiang (顏襄) had three daughters, the youngest of whom was called Yan Zhengzai. Yan Xiang asked his three daughters, "Shuliang He was a scholar and came from a noble family. His height was ten feet and had unparalleled military strength. He was very nice, although he was old and impatient, but that is not worth the hesitation, you three who want to be his wife?" While the two daughters kept silent, the third daughter Yan Zhengzai said, "By heeding father's decision, so what should I ask?" Yan Zhengzai's father said, "So it's you may marry to him."

When Yan Zhengzai married Shuliang He, she was 18 years old while he was 72 years old. Due to her husband's old age, Yan was worried that she would not be able to conceive a son in time, so she went to Mount Ni to pray to its mountain god for a son. She eventually gave birth to a son, so they named him Kong Qiu, courtesy name Zhongni.

=== Death of Kong He ===
Kong Qiu was three years old when Shuliang He died. Yan Zhengzai later moved to Queli (闕里) with her son and stepson Kong Pi, whose mother had also died. They lived in poverty and had a very difficult life. Due to her being literate thanks to her well-educated father, Yan Zhengzai personally taught Kong Qiu, which would have influences into his adult life and raised him into a nine-foot six inches man who everyone called "long man".

== Death ==
Yan Zhengzai died in 535 BC at the age of 33 when Kong Qiu was 17 years old. Her son first stationed her coffin along the crossroad of Wufu (五父之衢) and began asking around for the location of his father's grave. He eventually got told by Zou Man Fu (郰曼父)'s mother and managed to locate his father's grave near Fangshan, and Yan Zhengzai was buried together with him.

== See also ==
- Confucianism
- Marriageable age
- Teenage marriage
