= Wounded (play) =

American play

Wounded is a stage play collaboratively developed by The Los Angeles Theatre Ensemble under the direction of the ensemble's artistic director Tom Burmester. The play was inspired by interviews with injured veterans at the Walter Reed Medical Center in Washington DC.

Wounded is the first part of The Los Angeles Theatre Ensemble's War Cycle'.

== Synopsis ==
Set in the Fisher House rehabilitation home at the Walter Reed Medical Center, the main point of re-entry for wounded soldiers, sailors and marines, Wounded follows four young veterans and their families on their quest to readjust to life at home and to get on with lives newly transformed by their injuries, both physical and psychological.
