= Shuliang He =

Father of Confucius

- 叔梁紇
- Born: 622 BC; State of Lu
- Died: 548 BC; State of Lu
- Burial place: Cemetery of Duke Liang, State of Lu
- Other name: Kong He
- Spouse(s): Lady Shi; Kong Pi Mu; Yan Zhengzai
- Children: 9 daughters Kong Pi (son); Confucius (son)
- Relatives: Bo Xia (father)
- Military career
- Allegiance: Lu state

Kong He (Chinese: 孔紇; pinyin: Kǒng Hé), (622 BC – 548 BC) also known as Shuliang He (Chinese: 叔梁紇; pinyin: Shūliáng Hé), was a scholar-official and military officer of the State of Lu. He was the son of the Lu political figure Bo Xia and the father of Kong Pi and Confucius.

== History ==
On the 69th day of the fourth lunar month of the year 563 BCE, Shuliang He was supposedly responsible for holding open the gates of Bi Yang (偪阳), so that soldiers from his side who had already entered Bi Yang could escape. Meng Xianzi, then leader of the Mengsun clan of Lu (one of the Three Huan), praised him by saying, "This is what the Classic of Poetry meant by 'having the strength of a tiger'."

In the autumn of 556 BC, Duke Ling of Qi's army attacked the border of Lu State, with Gao Hou besieged Zang Wuzhong's defense line and captured him. Shuliang He, Zang Chou, and Zang Jia led 300 soldiers to attack the Qi army at night and helped escort Zang Wuzhong back to safety. They then return to battle the Qi army. Qi retreated soon after.

Shuliang He's first wife Lady Shi had given birth to nine children, all daughters. Kong also had a son, named Kong Pi (孔皮). However, as Kong Pi's mother was a concubine and Pi himself was said to have deformities in his feet, he could not become his father's successor. Thus, the aged He was heirless until he approached and managed to persuade Yan Xiang (顏襄), the father of Yan family for a marriage to one of his daughters; he married Yan Zhengzai (顏徵在), the third and youngest daughter. When Shuliang He married Yan Zhengzai, he was 72 years old while Yan was 18 years old.

It is generally thought that Kong Qiu (Confucius) was born on September 28, 551 BC. His birthplace was in Zou, Lu state (near present-day Qufu, Shandong Province).

== Death ==
Shuliang He died when Kong Qiu was three years old, his sons Kong Pi and Kong Qiu were raised by his widow in poverty. After his widow's death, his son Kong Qiu managed to locate his grave near Fangshan and buried her with him.
