= Mount Ni =

Mountain in Shandong, China

- Chinese: 尼山; pinyin: Ní Shān
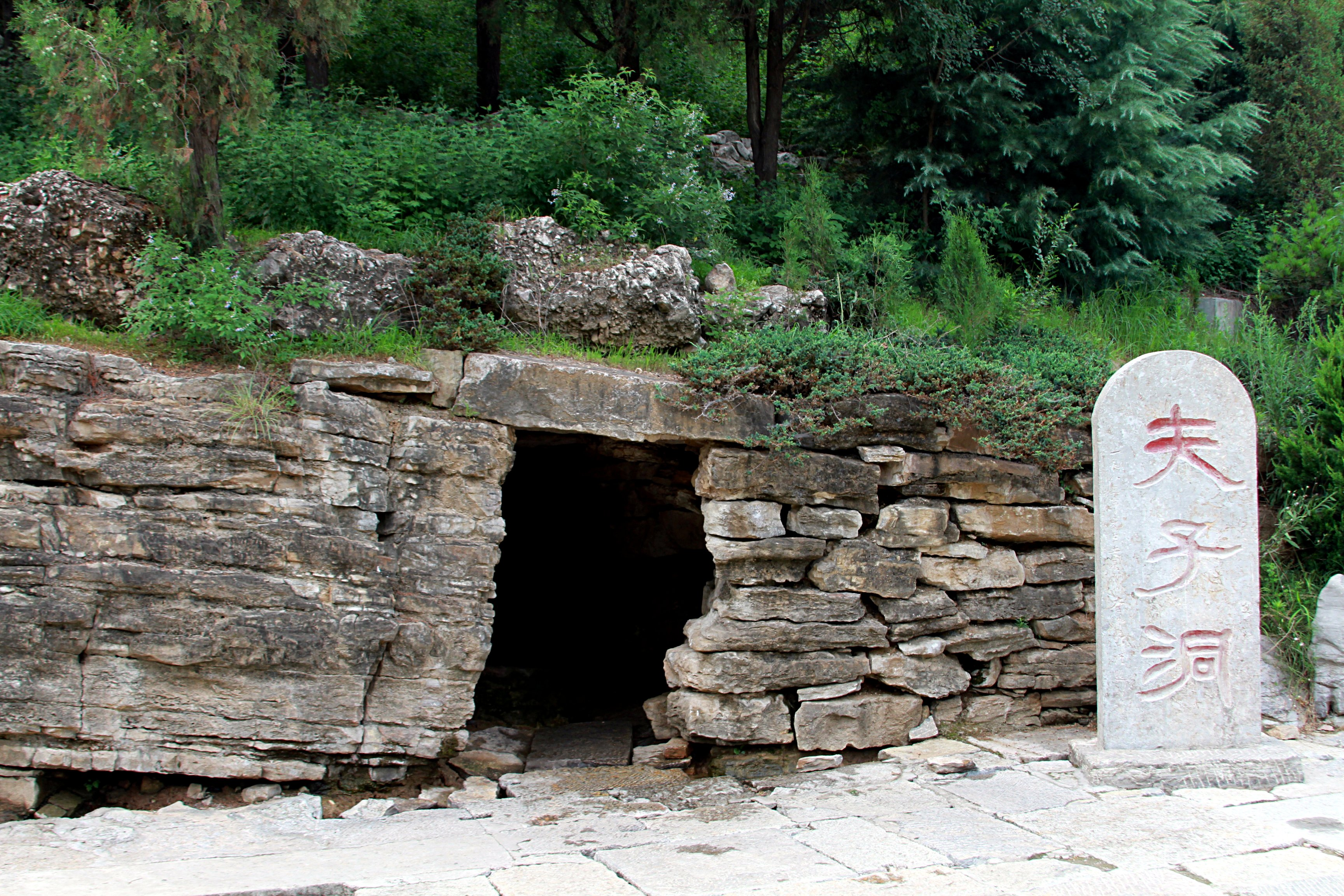
- Confucius cave on Mount Ni.

Highest point
- Elevation: 340 m (1,120 ft)
- Coordinates: 35°30′10.89″N 117°13′2.50″E

Geography
- Location within China
- Location: Shandong, China

Mount Ni (Chinese: 尼山; pinyin: Ní Shān) is a hill about 30 km (19 mi) to the southeast of the city of Qufu in Shandong Province, China. The hill is culturally significant because it is traditionally regarded as the birthplace of Confucius. It is also the site of a historical temple dedicated to Shuliang He, the father of Confucius, a Confucian academy (Chinese: 尼山書院; pinyin: Níshān Shūyuàn), and the Yusheng Memorial Temple (Chinese: 毓聖侯祠; pinyin: Yùshèng Hóucí). In 2016, a statue of Confucius was completed on the Mount. Standing at 72 meters, it is the tallest statue of Confucius in the world.

== Background ==
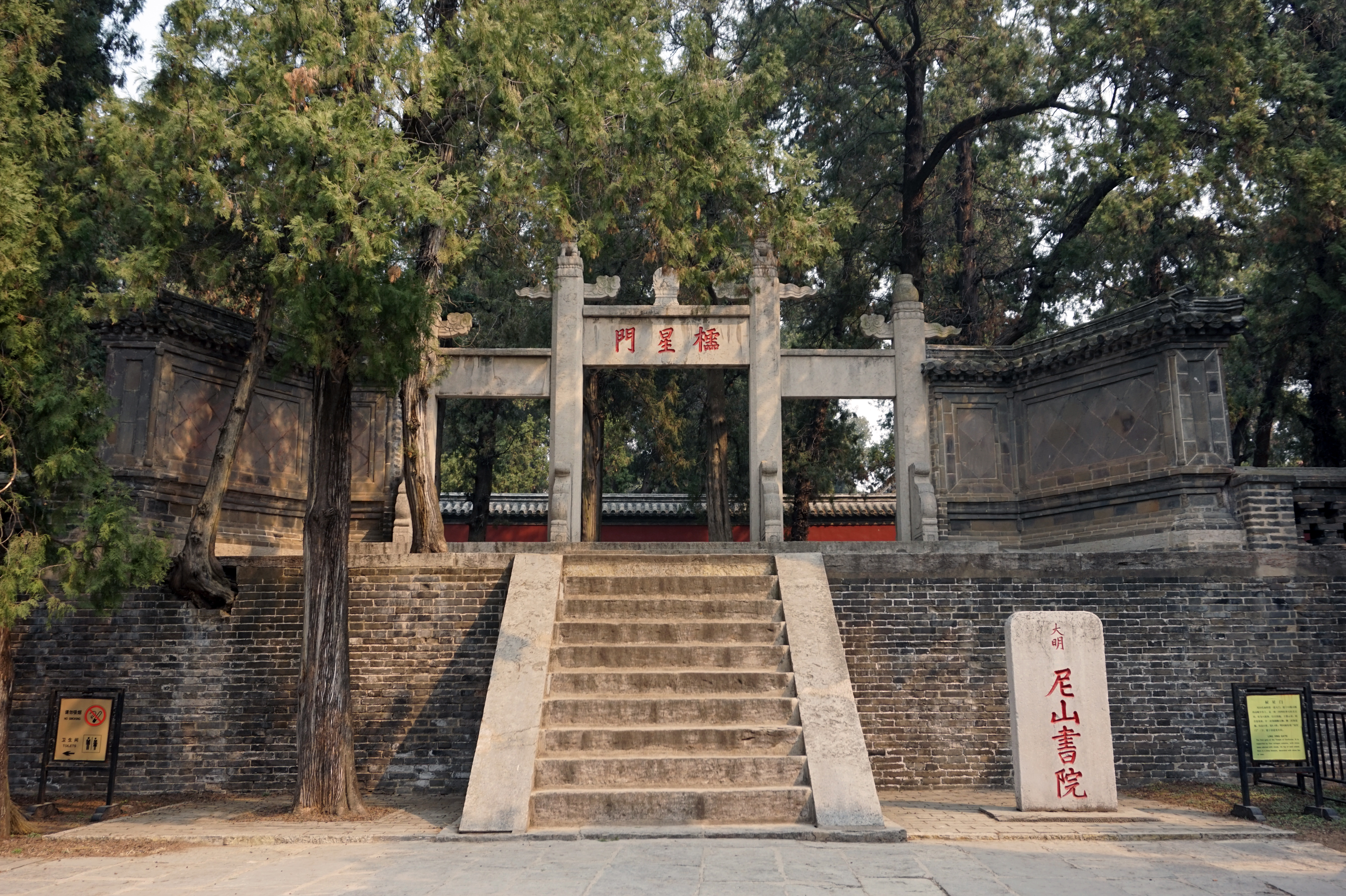
Mount Ni Academy

According to the Han dynasty historian Sima Qian, Confucius's parents-to-be, Shuliang He and Yan Zhengzai, went to pray at Mount Ni and Yan Zhengzai gave birth to Confucius afterwards.

The existence of the Temple of Kong He can be traced back to the times of the Northern Wei dynasty (386–535 CE). However, the temple was abandoned and restored repeatedly during the Later Tang, Later Zhou, Song, Jin, and Yuan dynasties. A major reconstruction was undertaken during the Ming dynasty (in 1417 during the reign of the Yongle Emperor). Further expansion of the temple followed during the Qing dynasty. As a result, most of the extant structures of the temple date from either the Ming or the Qing era. The current architectural complex contains three sets of buildings, the Kong He Temple, the Confucian Academy, and the Yusheng Memorial Temple.

The Kong He Temple consists of the following halls: the Dacheng Hall (literally "Hall of Great Achievement") dedicated to Confucius, a "Sleeping Palace" dedicated to his wife Qiguan, the Hall of Qi Shengwang and the Sleeping Palace of Qi Shengwang. The Yusheng Memorial Temple is dedicated to mountain spirit of Mount Ni. The Confucian academy contains a lecture hall as well as rooms that were used by the temple management staff. Other structures in the academy include the Erdai and Sandai Halls, the Liang Wu, the Lingxing Gate (靈星門), the Shen Bao, the Tudi Temple (dedicated to the local Earth Deity), and the Guan Chuan Pavilion. The entire complex on Mount Ni is walled in.

Outside the eastern enclosure wall lies the Confucius Cave (Chinese: 夫子洞; pinyin: Fūzǐ Dòng). According to the legend, Confucius was abandoned by his mother in this cave after his birth because of his ugliness. The baby was then taken care of by a tiger and an eagle, which convinced his mother to take him back.
