= Wind It Up =

Wind It Up may refer to:

- "Wind It Up (Rewound)", a 1993 single by The Prodigy
- "Wind It Up" (Barenaked Ladies song), 2006
- "Wind It Up" (Gwen Stefani song), 2006
- "Wind It Up", Todrick Hall featuring Vonzell Solomon song from the soundtrack of MTV's Todrick, 2015
