= Wound (disambiguation) =

A wound is a type of injury.

Wound may also refer to:

== Arts, entertainment, and media ==
- Wound, a 1991 album by Autopsia
- Wounds (album), a 2008 album by The Funeral Pyre
- Wound, a 1992 extended play by Buzzov•en
- "Wound", a song by the Smashing Pumpkins from Machina/The Machines of God (2000)
- The Wound (1998 film), a Turkish film
- Ghaav: The Wound, a 2002 Indian film
- The Wound (2017 film), a South African film
- The Wounds, a 1998 Serbian drama film
- Wounds (film), a 2019 American psychological horror film
- Wounds, English name for Heridas, a 2022 Spanish drama TV series

== Other uses ==
- Wound (law), a legal term
- Narcissistic wound, a repeated or recurrent threat that is either identical or similar to a narcissist's grandiose self-perception
- Winding (disambiguation)

== See also ==
- Wounded (disambiguation)
