= Knee (disambiguation) =

A knee is a joint typical of humans, mammals, birds and arthropods.

Knee may also refer to:

== Shapes ==
Structures with relatively sharp bends, such as:

- Cypress knee, structure on cypress-tree root
- Knee (construction), a bent piece of wood that takes stress, as commonly used in construction of wooden boats (boat knee)
- Knee rafter, a bent rafter used to gain head room in an attic
- Knee wall, a short wall typically under one meter used to support the rafters in timber roof construction
- Knee (geography), a distinctive riverbend

== People ==
- Knee (gamer), champion Tekken player and influencer
- Allan Knee, American film and television writer and playwright
- Bernie Knee (1924–1994), American singer/musician
- Christian Knees (born 1981), German racing cyclist
- Derek Knee (1922–2014), British Army officer, interpreter for Field Marshal Bernard Montgomery
- Fred Knee (1868–1914), British trade unionist and socialist politician
- Gina Knee (1898–1982), American painter
- Miriam Knee (born 1938), Australian cricketer

== Science and technology ==
- Hard knee or soft knee, a setting in an electronic audio compressor device
- Knee of a curve, a point where the curve visibly bends

== Other uses ==
- Knee (strike), a strike with the kneecap or the surrounding area in combat sports
- KNEE (FM), a radio station (95.1 FM) licensed to serve Nenana, Alaska, United States
- "Knees", a song by Bebe Rexha from the album Expectations
- "Knees", a 2018 single by Ocean Alley, from the album Chiaroscuro
- "Knees", a song and lead single by Injury Reserve from their 2021 album By the Time I Get to Phoenix

== See also ==
- Kneecap
- Wounded Knee (disambiguation)
