= Wounded Knee =

Wounded Knee may refer to

== Historical events ==
- Wounded Knee Massacre of 1890, a mass shooting of Lakota people by U.S. government soldiers; often labeled the deadliest mass shooting in American history
- Wounded Knee Occupation of 1973

== Places ==
- Wounded Knee Creek
- Wounded Knee, South Dakota
- Wounded Knee Battlefield, a U.S. National Historic Landmark site of the 1890 massacre

== Arts, entertainment, and media ==
=== Music ===
- "Wounded Knee", a 1989 song on Nik Kershaw's The Works
- "Wounded Knee", a 1993 instrumental piece by Primus from the album Pork Soda
- "Wounded Knee", a 1997 song by Walela
- "Bury my Heart at Wounded Knee", a 1992 song by Buffy Sainte-Marie
- "We Were All Wounded at Wounded Knee", a 1973 song by the Native American rock band Redbone

=== Other arts, entertainment, and media ===
- Bury My Heart at Wounded Knee, a 1970 book by Dee Brown, which chronicles events leading up to the Wounded Knee Massacre
  - Bury My Heart at Wounded Knee (film), a 2007 film adaptation of the Dee Brown book

== See also ==
- Wounded Knees, an American band
