= Ni (surname) =

Ni (倪)
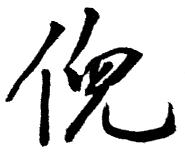
- The Chinese surname Ni/Ngai in the running hand style.
- Pronunciation: Ni (Mandarin); Ngai (Cantonese); Nga, Ngeh (Eastern Min)
- Language: Chinese

Origin
- Language: Old Chinese

Other names
- Variant forms: Ngai, Nee

Ni is the Mandarin pinyin and Wade–Giles romanization of the Chinese surname written 倪 in Chinese character. It is romanized Ngai in Cantonese. It is romanized as "Geh" in Malaysia and Singapore, and "Ge" in Indonesia, from its Minnan / Hokkian pronunciation. Ni is listed 71st in the Song dynasty classic text Hundred Family Surnames. As of 2008, it is the 116th most common surname in China, shared by 1.4 million people.

== Notable people ==
- Ni Bian or Ni Shui (倪说, 3rd century BC), Warring States period diplomat from the state of Song
- Ni Kuan (倪寬; died 103 BC), Western Han dynasty minister
- Ni Shu (9th – 10th century), Southern Han chancellor
- Ni Wenjun (died 1357), general of the Red Turban Rebellion
- Ni Zan (1301–1374), painter, one of the Four Masters of the Yuan dynasty
- Ni Yuanlu (1593–1644), Ming dynasty official and painter
- Ni Xiangkai (倪象愷; fl. 1720s–30s), Qing dynasty Governor of Taiwan prefecture
- Ni Wenwei (倪文蔚; 1823–1890), Qing dynasty Governor of Guangxi and Henan provinces
- Ni Sichong (1868–1924), warlord of the Anhui clique
- Ni Guizhen (倪桂珍; 1869–1931), matriarch of the Soong family, mother of Soong Ching-ling, Soong Mei-ling, and T. V. Soong
- Ni Daolang (1879–1952), Governor of Anhui of the Wang Jingwei regime, executed for treason
- Ni Yingdian (倪映典; 1885–1910), anti-Qing revolutionary leader, posthumously awarded rank of General
- Ni Chiang-huai (倪蔣懷; 1894–1943), Taiwanese artist
- Ni Baochun (倪葆春; 1899–1997), physician, President of St. John's University, Shanghai
- Ni Zhiliang (1900–1965), PLA lieutenant general, first Chinese ambassador to North Korea
- Watchman Nee or Ni Tuosheng (1903–1972), Christian leader
- Ni Wen-ya (1903–2006), President of the Legislative Yuan of the Republic of China
- Ni Chao (倪超; 1907–1996), civil engineer, President of National Cheng Kung University
- Ngai Shiu-kit (1924–2015), Hong Kong legislator
- Ni Weidou (born 1932), scientist, former vice-president of Tsinghua University
- Ni Zhifu (1933–2013), politician, Politburo member
- Ni Xiance (born 1935), former Governor of Jiangxi province, convicted of corruption
- Ni Kuang (1935–2022), Hong Kong novelist
- Ni Tianzeng (倪天增; 1937–1992), Vice Mayor of Shanghai
- Ngoy Bun-Tek (倪文德; born 1941),the Donut King of Southern California
- Ni Zhiqin (born 1942), Chinese high jumper who broke the world record
- Ni Wei-Tou (born 1944), Taiwanese physicist
- Siu Yam-yam or Ni Xiaoyan (born 1945), Hong Kong actress
- Yi Shu or Ni Yishu (born 1946), Hong Kong novelist, sister of Ni Kuang
- Ni Min-jan (1946–2005), Taiwanese actor
- Fang Ying or Ni Fangning (方盈; 1948–2010), Hong Kong actress
- Geh Min (倪敏; born 1950), former President of Nature Society in Singapore
- Ni Fake (born 1954), former Vice Governor of Anhui province
- Ni Ping (born 1959), actress and television presenter
- Ni Yulan (born 1960), civil rights lawyer
- Ngeh Koo Ham or Ni Kehan (倪可汉; born 1961), Malaysian politician, member of the Malaysian Parliament
- Ni Xialian (born 1963), female table tennis player, world champion
- Nga Kor Ming or Ni Kemin (倪可敏; born 1972), Malaysian politician, Perak State Legislative Assembly
- Shunza or Ni Shunzi (born 1973), singer-songwriter
- Fu-Te Ni or Ni Fude (born 1982), Taiwanese baseball player
- Ni Hua (born 1983), chess grandmaster
- Ni Hong (born 1986), female fencer, Olympic medalist
- Ni Ni (born 1988), actress
- Victo Ngai (倪傳婧; born 1988), American illustrator raised in Hong Kong
- Ni Yusong (born 1991), football player

== See also ==
- Ngai (surname)
