= Qufu Mosque =

Mosque in Qufu, Shandong, China

- 曲阜市清真寺
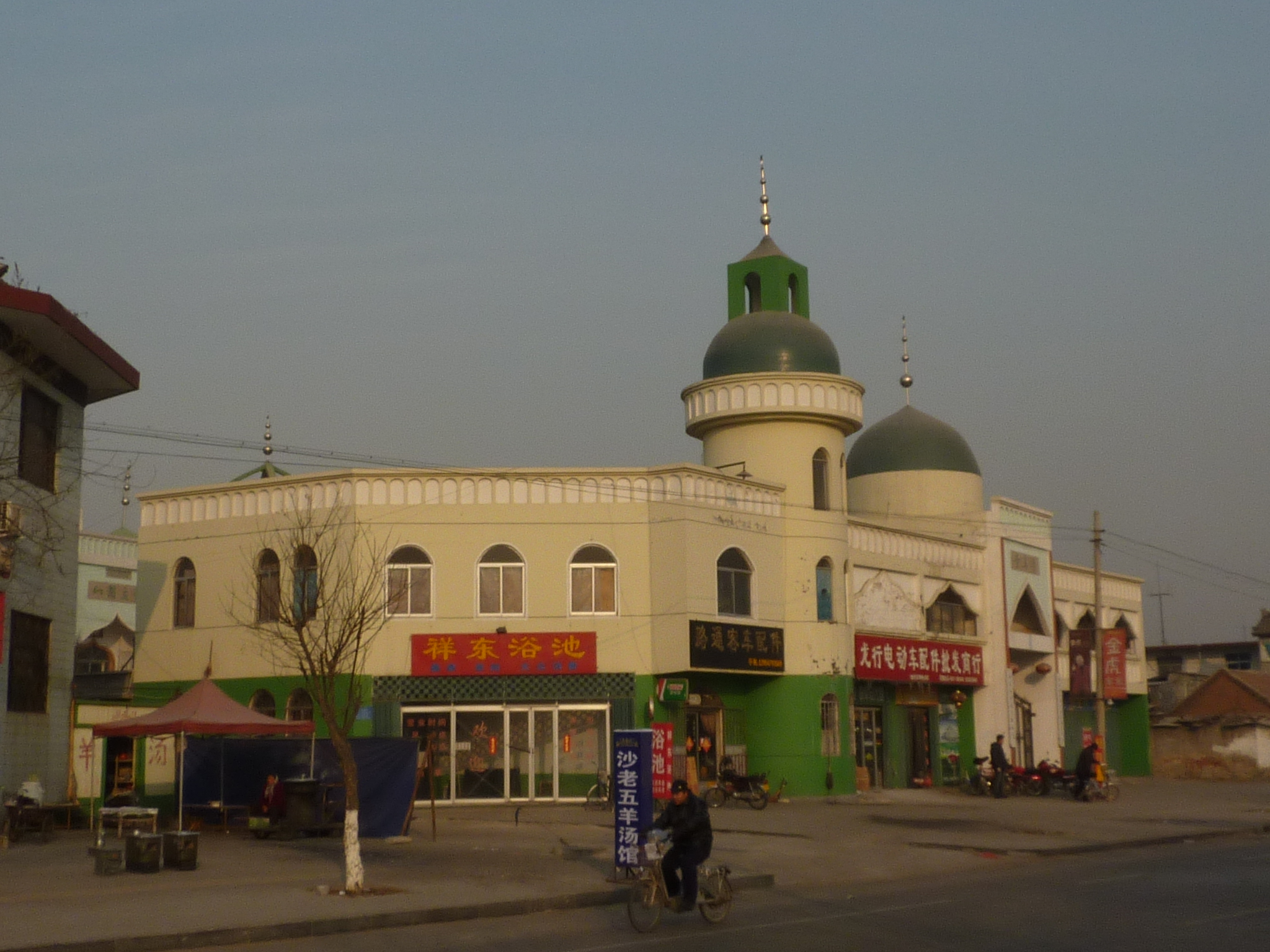

- Location of the mosque in Shandong

Religion
- Affiliation: Sunni Islam
- Ecclesiastical or organizational status: Mosque
- Status: Active

Location
- Location: Qufu, Shandong
- Country: China
- Interactive map of Qufu Mosque
- Coordinates: 35°35′46″N 116°58′58″E

Architecture
- Type: Mosque
- Dome: 2 (maybe more)

Chinese name
- Chinese: 曲阜市清真寺
- Traditional Chinese: 阿爾丁清真寺
Transcriptions
Standard Mandarin
- Hanyu Pinyin: Qūfù Shì Qīngzhēnsì

The Qufu Mosque (Chinese: 曲阜市清真寺; pinyin: Qūfù Shì Qīngzhēnsì) is a mosque in Qufu City, in the Shandong province of China.

== See also ==
- Islam in China
- List of mosques in China
