= Nishan Reservoir =

- Location: Nishan Town, Qufu City, Shandong Province
- Purpose: flood control, irrigation

Nishan Reservoir (simplified Chinese: 尼山水库; traditional Chinese: 尼山水庫; pinyin: Níshān shuǐkù), also known as Confucius Lake, is a large-sized reservoir located in Nishan Town, southeast of Qufu City, Shandong Province, China, on the upstream channel of the Xiaoyi River. It is mainly used for flood control combined with irrigation, power generation, farming and other comprehensive use. The lake formed by the reservoir is called "Sacred Water Lake".

The construction of Nishan Reservoir started on November 28, 1958, and was completed on September 5, 1960. It is the largest reservoir in Jining. The Reservoir controls a watershed area of 264.1 square kilometers, with a total storage capacity of 118 million cubic meters.
