= Lu Commandery =

Ancient Chinese political subdivision

Lu Commandery (Chinese: 魯郡) was a Chinese commandery that existed from Han dynasty to Tang dynasty. It was located in present-day southern Shandong province.

The commandery's predecessor was the Xue Commandery (薛郡), an administrative division established during Qin Shi Huang's reign on the former territories of Lu state. In early Western Han, it was part of the Kingdom of Chu, a vassal kingdom/principality of the Han dynasty. In 155 BC, Emperor Jing created a separate Principality of Lu, and granted it to his son Liu Yu. Yu's descendants held Lu until the Xin dynasty, when the prince was deposed and Lu became a commandery. In 2 AD, the principality consisted of 6 counties: Lu (魯), Bian (卞), Wenyang (汶陽), Fan (蕃), Zou (騶) and Xue (薛).

In Eastern Han, Lu Commandery was initially granted to Liu Xing (劉興). However, Lu was later merged to the Principality of Donghai (東海) while Xing was relocated to Beihai. After the death of Liu Qiang (彊), Prince Gong (恭) of Donghai, the central government took over Donghai Commandery, and the principality's territory became equivalent to Lu Commandery.

The commandery once again became the Principality of Lu in 232, when the Cao Wei dynasty granted it to Cao Wen (曹溫). The commandery was restored with the establishment of Jin dynasty. In Song dynasty, the commandery administered 6 counties, including Zou, Wenyang, Lu, Yangping (陽平), Xinyang (新陽), and Bian. It was eventually abolished during Northern Qi.

In Sui and Tang dynasties, Lu Commandery became the alternative name for Yan Prefecture. It included 10 counties: Xiaqiu (瑕丘), Qufu (曲阜), Qianfeng (乾封), Sishui (泗水), Zou (鄒), Rencheng (任城), Gongqiu (龔丘), Jinxiang (金鄉), Yutai (魚台) and Laiwu (萊蕪).

== Population ==
Dynasty	Western Han	Eastern Han	Western Jin	Liu Song	Northern Wei	Sui dynasty	Tang dynasty
Year	2	140	280	464	534	609	742
Households	118,045	78,447	3,500	4,604	15,160	124,019	88,987
Population	607,381	411,590		28,307	47,329		580,608

== Princes of Lu and Donghai ==
- Liu Yu (餘), Prince Gong (共) of Lu, 155–128 BC;
- Liu Guang (光), Prince An (安) of Lu, 128–88 BC;
- Liu Qingji (慶忌), Prince Xiao (孝) of Lu, 88–51 BC;
- Liu Feng (封), Prince Qing (頃) of Lu, 51–23 BC;
- Liu Suo (睃), Prince Wen (文) of Lu, 23 BC – 4 AD;
- Liu Min (閔), 4–9;
- Liu Xing (興), Prince Jing (靖) of Beihai, 26–42;
- Liu Qiang (彊), Prince Gong (恭) of Donghai, 42–58;
- Liu Zheng (政), Prince Jing (靖) of Donghai, 58–102;
- Liu Su (肅), Prince Qing (頃) of Donghai, 102–125;
- Liu Zhen (臻), Prince Xiao (孝) of Donghai, 125–156;
- Liu Zhi (祗), Prince Yi (懿) of Donghai, 156–200;
- Liu Xian (羨), 200–220;
- Cao Wen (溫), 232–265.
