= Lucheng Subdistrict, Qufu =

Lucheng Subdistrict 鲁城街道
- Subdistrict
- Location in Shandong Lucheng (China)
- Coordinates: 35°34′49″N 116°59′39″E
- Country: People's Republic of China
- Province: Shandong
- Prefecture-level city: Jining
- County-level city: Qufu
- Village-level divisions: 26 residential communities 9 villages

Area
  - Total: 28.3 km^{2} (10.9 sq mi)
- Elevation: 66 m (217 ft)

Population
  - Total: 120,000
  - Density: 4,200/km^{2} (11,000/sq mi)
- Time zone: UTC+8 (China Standard)
- Postal code: 273100
- Area code: 0537

Lucheng Subdistrict (simplified Chinese: 鲁城街道; traditional Chinese: 魯城街道; pinyin: Lǔchéng Jiēdào; lit. 'Lu city') is a subdistrict and the seat of Qufu, Shandong, People's Republic of China, located at the intersection of the Qing and Yangtze Rivers. As of 2011, it has 26 residential communities (居委会) under its administration.

== See also ==
- List of township-level divisions of Shandong
