= Yan Prefecture (Shandong) =

Historical administrative division in Shandong, China

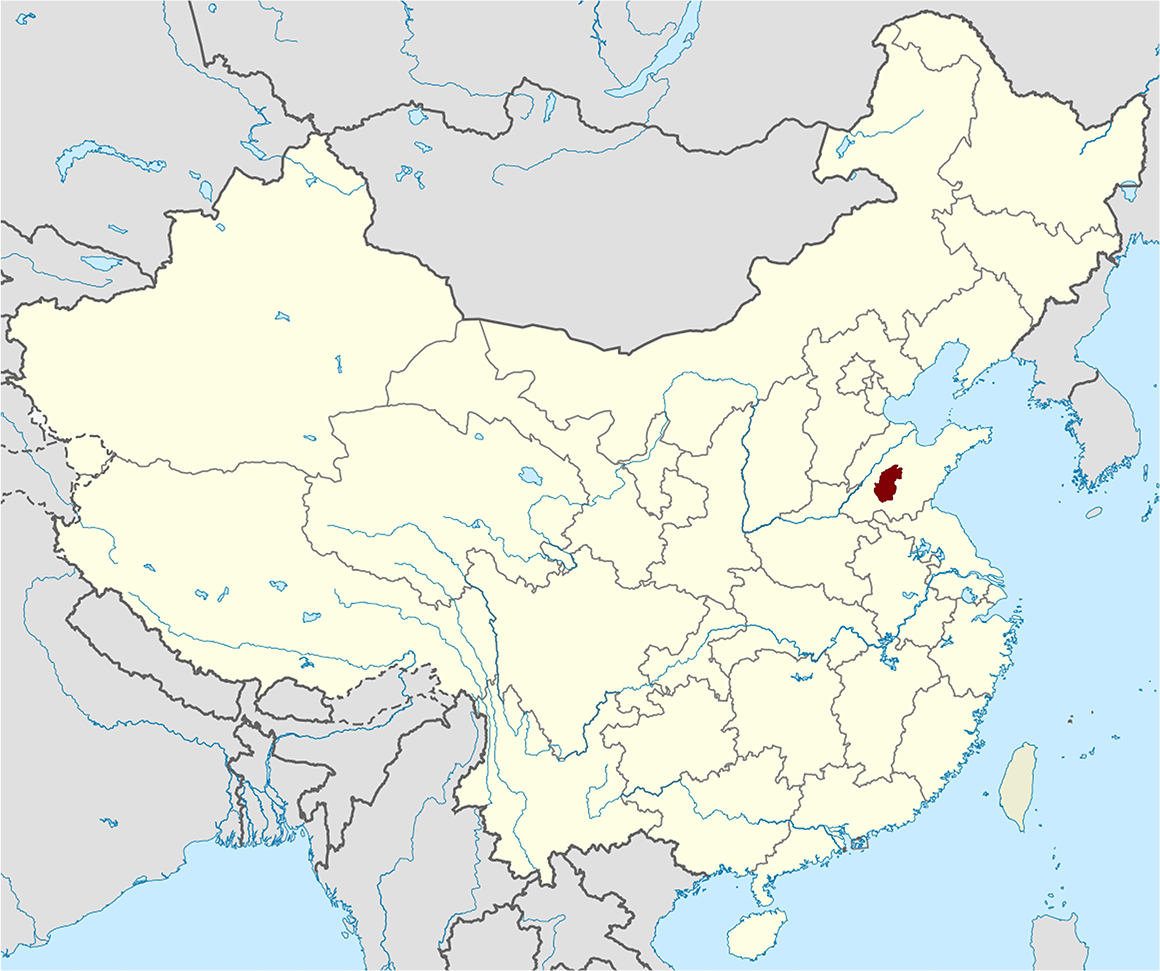
- Traditional Chinese: 兗州
- Simplified Chinese: 兖州
Transcriptions
Standard Mandarin
- Hanyu Pinyin: Yǎn Zhōu
- Wade–Giles: Yen^{3} Chou^{1}

Yanzhou or Yan Prefecture was a zhou (prefecture) in imperial China centering on modern Yanzhou District, Jining, Shandong, China. It existed (intermittently) until 1385, when the Ming dynasty created Yanzhou Prefecture.

Yan Prefecture was named after Yan Province, one of the Nine Provinces of ancient China. The modern district of Yanzhou District retains its name.

== Geography ==
The administrative region of Yan Prefecture in the Tang dynasty is in modern central Shandong. It probably includes parts of modern:

- Under the administration of Jining:
  - Jining
  - Qufu
  - Zoucheng
  - Wenshang County
  - Sishui County
- Under the administration of Tai'an:
  - Tai'an
  - Ningyang County
- Under the administration of Laiwu:
  - Laiwu
