= Qufu =

Qufu 曲阜市 Kufow
- County-level city
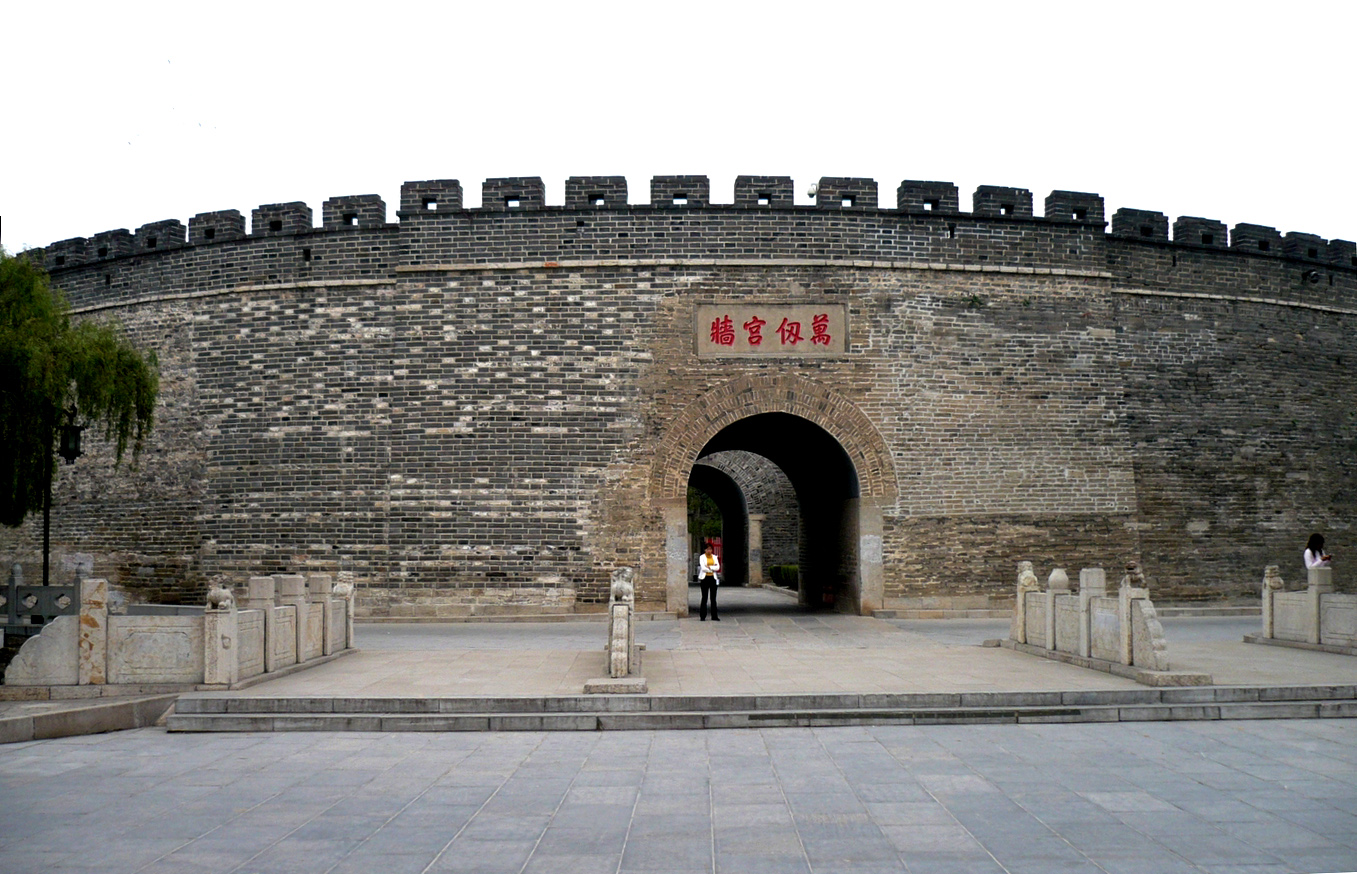
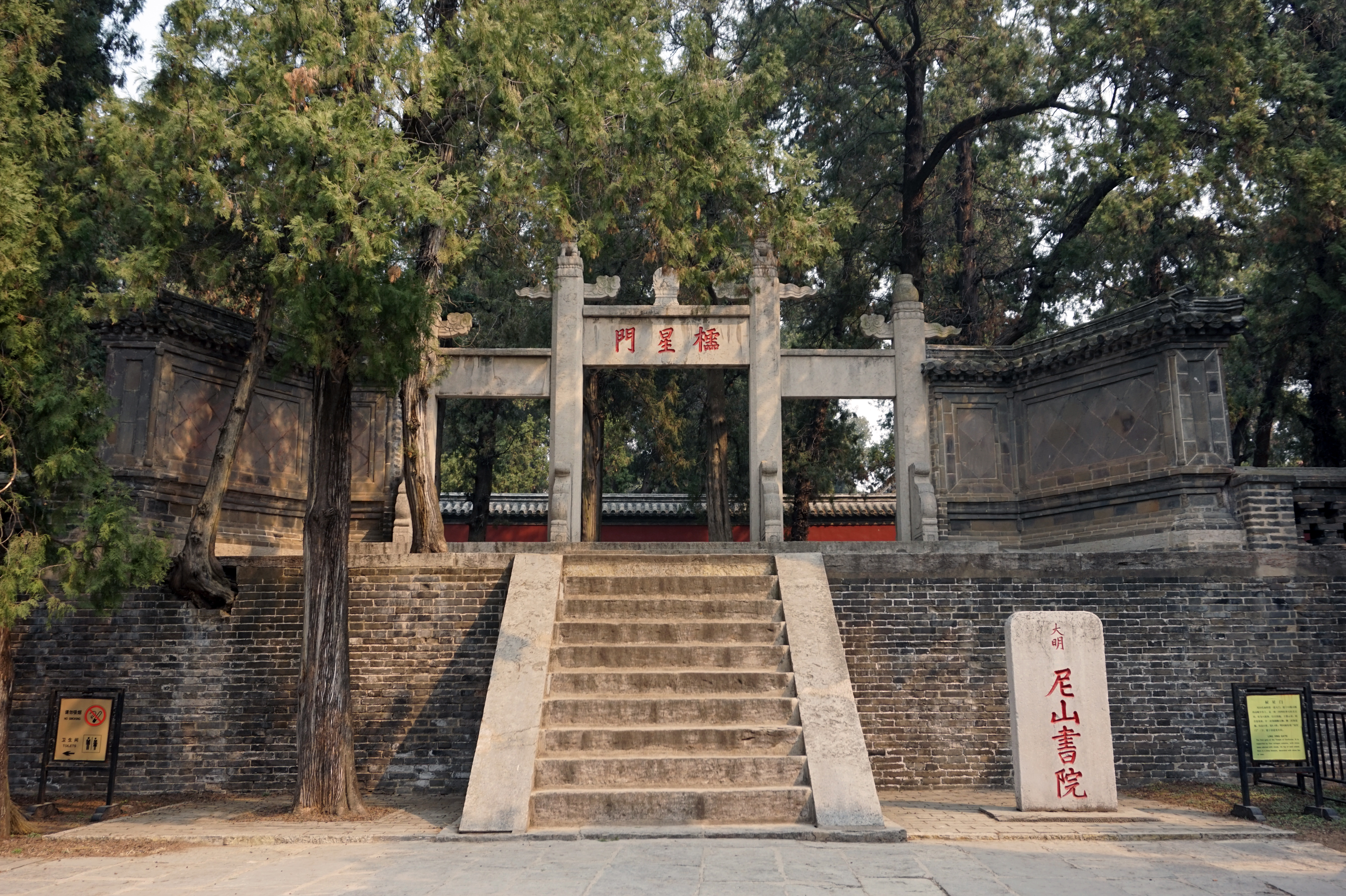
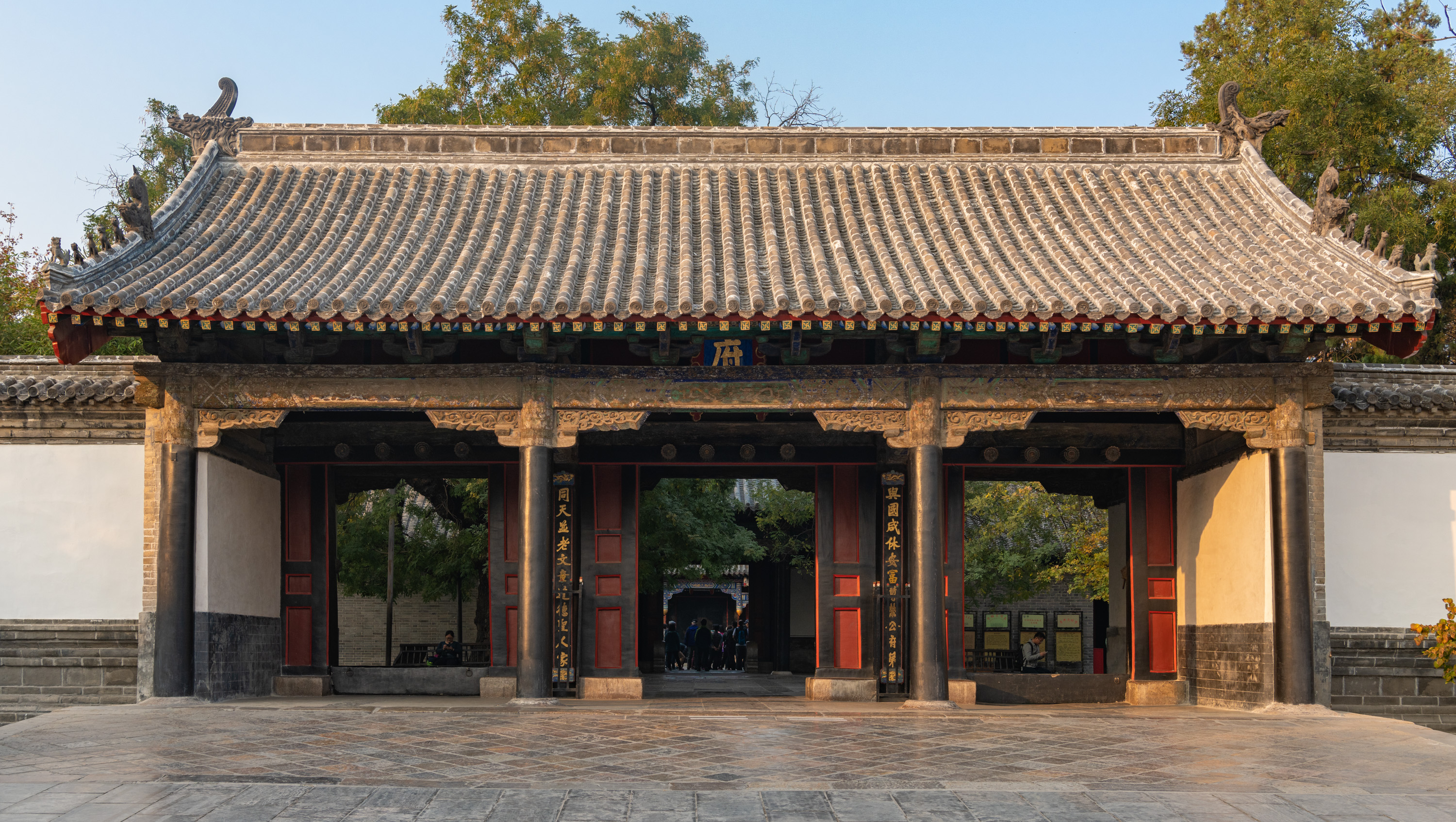
- Temple of Duke of Zhou Qufu's south gate Mount Ni Academy Kong Family Mansion

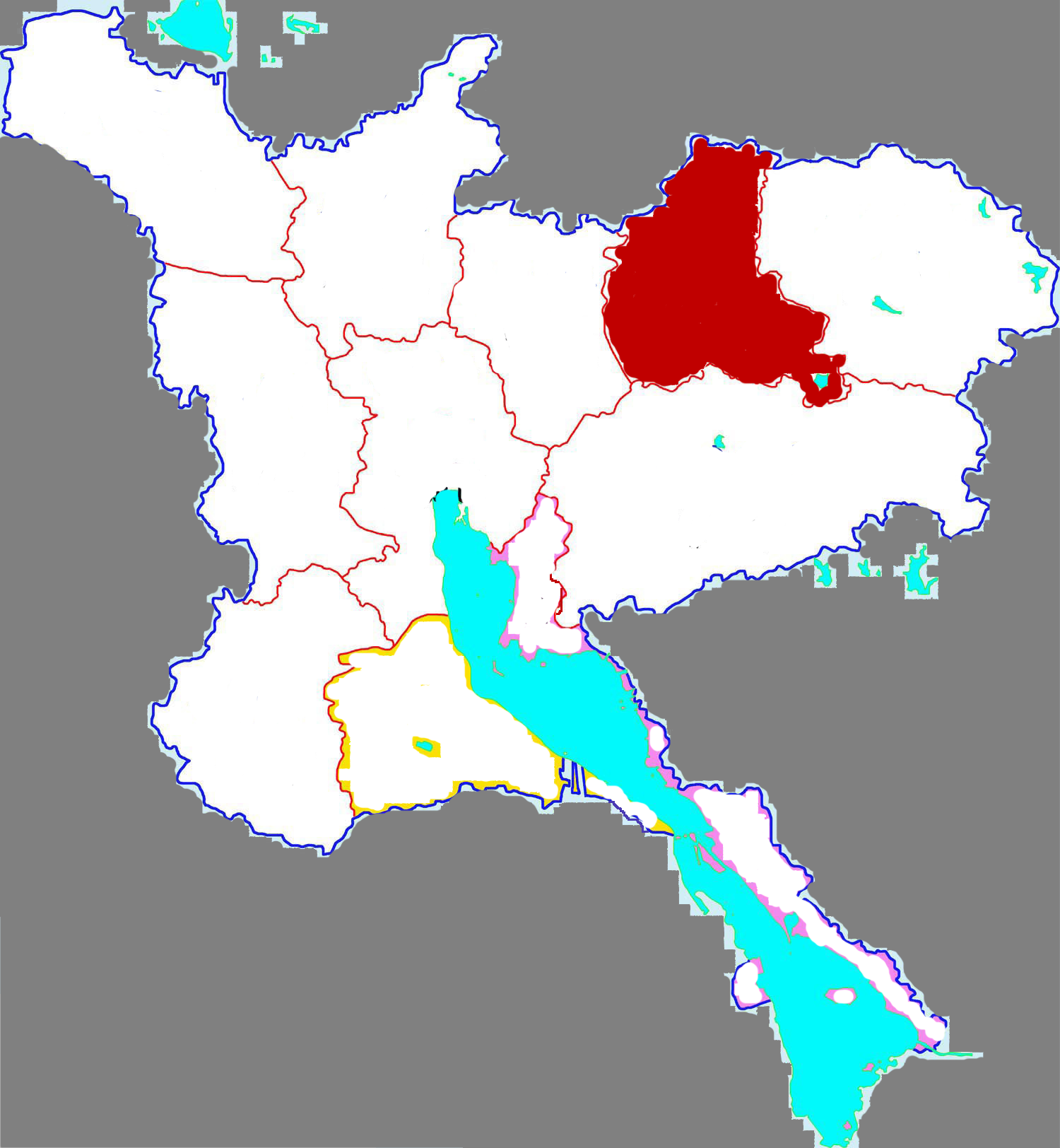
- Location in Jining

- Location in Shandong Qufu (China)
- Coordinates (Qufu municipal government): 35°34′55″N 116°59′10″E
- Country: People's Republic of China
- Province: Shandong
- Prefecture-level city: Jining

Area
  - County-level city: 815 km^{2} (315 sq mi)
- Elevation: 65 m (213 ft)

Population (2017)
  - County-level city: 653,000
  - Density: 801/km^{2} (2,080/sq mi)
  - Urban: 188,000
- Time zone: UTC+8 (China Standard)
- Postal code: 273100
- Website: http://www.qufu.gov.cn/

Qufu
- "Qufu" in Chinese characters
- Chinese: 曲阜
- Postal: Kufow
- Literal meaning: "Crooked Hill"
Transcriptions
Standard Mandarin
- Hanyu Pinyin: Qūfù
- Bopomofo: ㄑㄩ ㄈㄨˋ
- Gwoyeu Romatzyh: Chiufuh
- Wade–Giles: Chʻü^{1}-fu^{4}
- Tongyong Pinyin: Cyu-fù
- IPA: [tɕʰý.fû]
Yue: Cantonese
- Yale Romanization: Kūk-fauh
- Jyutping: kuk1 fau6
- IPA: [kʰʊk̚˥ fɐw˨]
Southern Min
- Hokkien POJ: Khek-pu
- Tâi-lô: Khik-pū
Middle Chinese
- Middle Chinese: kʰjowk bjúw
Old Chinese
- Baxter–Sagart (2014): *kʰ(r)ok [b](r)uʔ

Qufu (pronounced [tɕʰý.fû]; Chinese: 曲阜) is a county-level city in southwestern Shandong province, East China. It is located about 130 kilometres (81 mi) south of the provincial capital Jinan and 45 km (28 mi) northeast of the prefectural seat of Jining. Qufu has an area of 815 square kilometers, and a total population of 653,000 inhabitants, of which, 188,000 live in urban areas.

Qufu is best known as the hometown of Confucius, who is traditionally believed to have been born at nearby Mount Ni. Qufu, being the capital of Lu and birthplace of Confucius, is known collectively with Zoucheng, the birthplace of Mencius, as "Zoulu". The city contains numerous historic palaces, temples and cemeteries. The three most famous cultural sites of the city, collectively known as San Kong (三孔; 'the Three Confucian [sites]', are the Temple of Confucius (Chinese: 孔庙; pinyin: Kǒngmiào), the Cemetery of Confucius (孔林; Kǒnglín), and the Kong Family Mansion (孔府; Kǒngfǔ). Together, these three sites have been listed as a UNESCO World Heritage Site since 1994.

== Etymology ==
The name Qufu literally means "crooked hill", and refers to a mile-long hill that was part of the city during its time as capital of the state of Lu.

Before the wide adoption of Pinyin, the name of the city (often viewed as a county seat, i.e. Qufu xian) was transcribed in English in a variety of ways, such as Ch'ü-fou-hien, Kio-feu-hien, Kio-fou-hien, Kiu-fu, Kiuh Fow, Keuhfow, Kufow, and Chufou.

Japanese city Gi-Fu (岐阜) was partially named after Qufu. After Oda Nobunaga conquered Inabayama Castle in 1567, he renamed it as Gifu. Gi came from Qishan (岐山), a legendary mountain from which the King Wu of Zhou proclaimed the war against Shang and unified China, whereas fu came from Qufu (曲阜). Nobunaga chose those characters because he hoped to unify all of Japan and wanted to be viewed as a great mind.

== History ==
=== Pre Qin era ===
China in the 5th BC

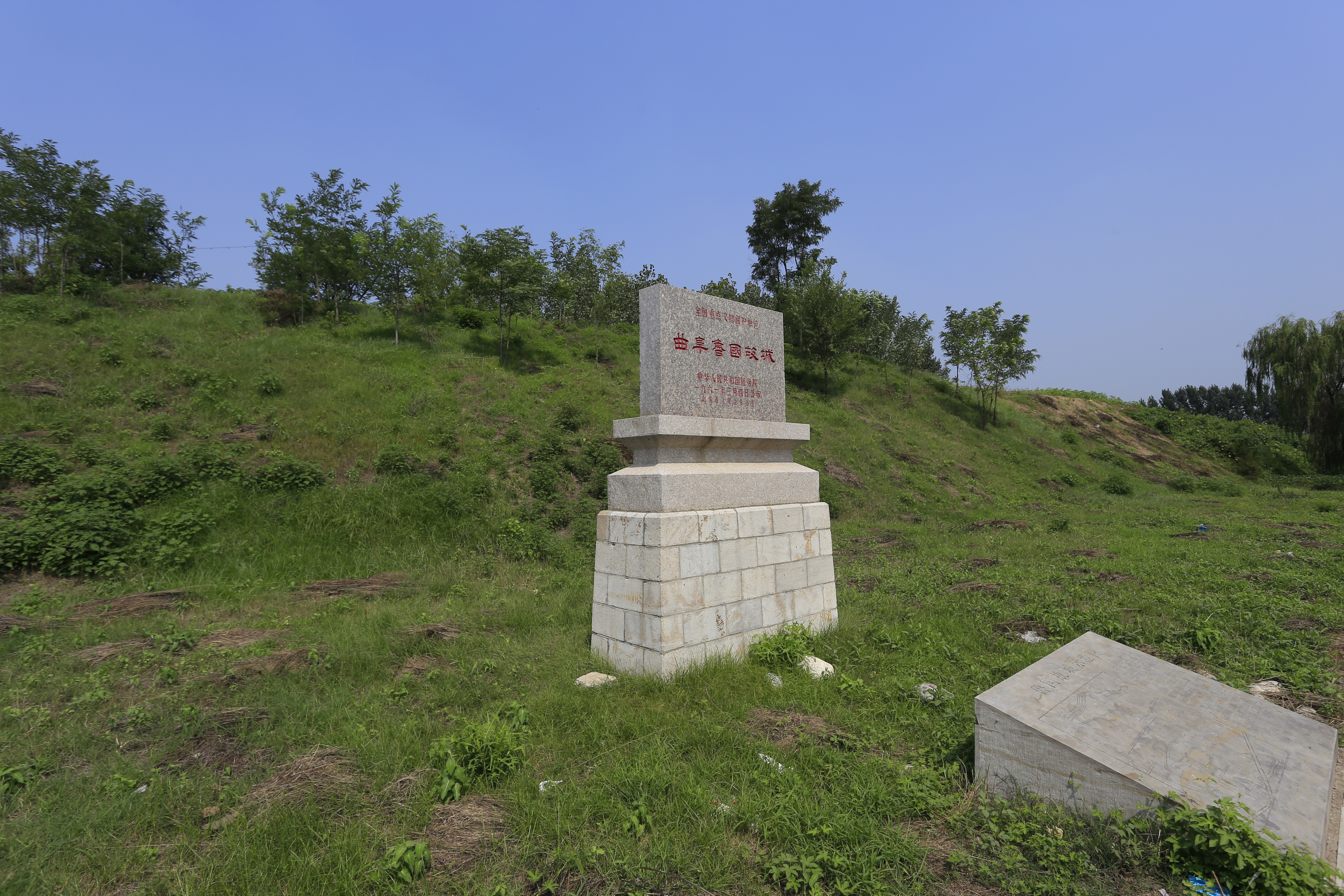
Ruins of capital of Lu in Qufu

According to legend, Shennong, one of the Three Sovereigns and Five Emperors, together with his son Shaohao made Qufu their capital.

During the Shang dynasty, the area around Qufu was home to the people of Yan (奄), who were counted by the Chinese among the "Eastern Barbarians" or Dongyi. After King Wu of Zhou founded the Zhou dynasty, his younger brother Duke of Zhou, Dan, an official of outstanding merit in the founding of the dynasty, was granted this land and took the title Duke of Lu. He did not, however, remain in Lu himself; he entrusted the rulership of Lu to his son Bo Qin and stayed on at the royal court to help manage the turbulent political situation following King Wu's death.

Along with Pugu (around Binzhou) and Xu (along the Huai River), Yan joined the Shang prince Wu Geng and the Three Guards in their failed rebellion against the Duke of Zhou c. 1042 BC. After the rebels' defeat, the Duke launched punitive campaigns against the Dongyi, forcing their submission and placing their territory under loyal nobles.

The territory of the Yan became part of the state of Lu, who made Qufu their capital throughout the Spring and Autumn period. This city had walls considerably larger than the present Ming-era fortifications, including more land to the east and north. In 249 BC, the state of Lu was conquered by Chu, and County of Lu was established in this region with administrative center in Qufu.

=== Imperial era ===
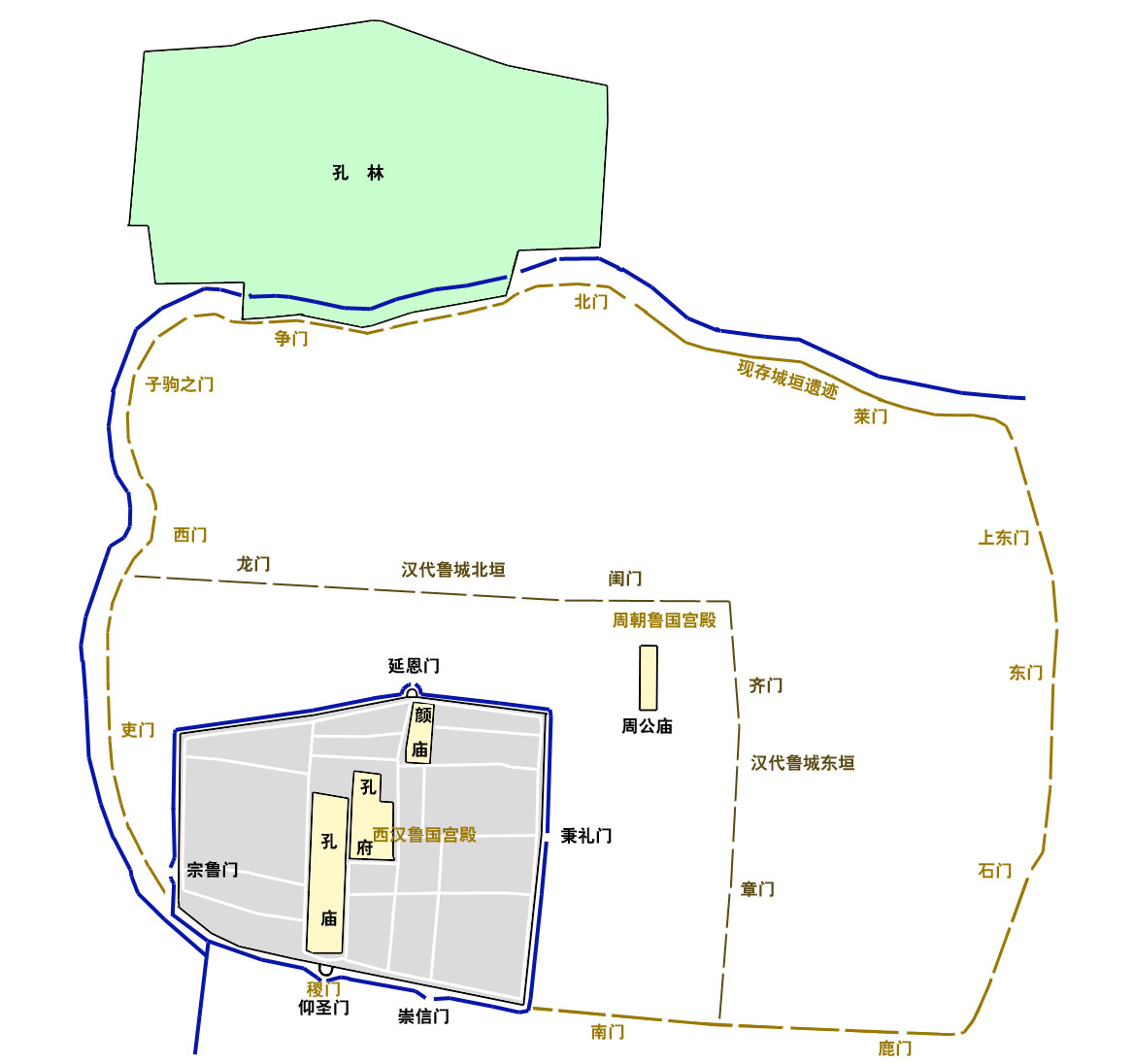
Map of Qufu's evolution: outer brown dash line: Qufu during Zhou dynasty, inner brown dash line: Qufu during Han dynasty, grey area: city of Qufu County in Zhengde era during Ming dynasty, green: Kong Lin

After Qin Shi Huang unified China, Qufu was put under the Xue Commandery (whose name was kept today as Xuecheng District, Zaozhuang). In 155 BC, Emperor Jing of Han dynasty created a separate Principality of Lu (魯國), and granted it to his son Liu Yu. Yu's descendants held Lu until the Xin dynasty, when the prince was deposed and Lu became a commandery (Lu Commandery, 魯郡). In 2 AD, the principality consisted of 6 counties: Lu (魯, which is Qufu), Bian (卞), Wenyang (汶陽), Fan (蕃), Zou (騶) and Xue (薛). The Lu Commandery existed until 758, when it was transformed into Yan Prefecture.

Passing Through Zou and Lu to Offer Sacrifice to Confucius, with a Sigh

Master, what was it you toiled for,
restless and unsettled all your days?
This land is still the old town of Zou,
your house now the palace of the Prince of Lu.
You sighed that the phoenix never came, grieving your own fate;
you mourned the captured unicorn, lamenting your Way was spent.
Now, beholding the offerings set between the two pillars—
it must be just as it was in your dream.

— Emperor Xuanzong of Tang (725)

During the Tang dynasty and the early days of the Song dynasty, the city was centered around the present-day Temple of Duke Zhou, at the northeastern corner of today's walled city. At 1012, Qufu was renamed to Xianyuan County (仙源縣), and relocated to the new site, some 4 km (2.5 mi) east of today's walled city, next to the supposed birthplace of the legendary Yellow Emperor and the tomb of his son Shaohao. A temple in honor of the Yellow Emperor was built there; all that remains today are two giant stelae (the Shou Qiu site).

After the conquest of the northern China by the Jurchens, the new Jin dynasty renamed Xianyuan back to Qufu (in 1142), but the city stayed at its Song location. It was not until the reign of the Jiajing Emperor of the Ming dynasty (1522) that the present-day city wall was built. The site of the city in 1012–1522 is now Jiuxian Village (舊縣村).

During the Southern Song dynasty the descendant of Confucius at Qufu, the Duke Yansheng Kong Duanyou fled south with the future Song Emperor Gaozong to Quzhou in Zhejiang, while the newly established Jin dynasty in the north appointed Kong Duanyou's brother Kong Duancao who remained in Qufu as Duke Yansheng. From that time up until the Yuan dynasty, there were two Duke Yanshengs, one in the north in Qufu and the other in the south at Quzhou. An invitation to come back to Qufu was extended to the southern Duke Yansheng Kong Zhu by the Yuan dynasty emperor Kublai Khan. The title was taken away from the southern branch after Kong Zhu rejected the invitation, so the northern branch of the family kept the title of Duke Yansheng. The southern branch still remained in Quzhou where they lived to this day. Confucius's descendants in Quzhou alone number 30,000. The Hanlin Academy rank of Wujing Boshi (五經博士) was awarded to the southern branch at Quzhou by a Ming emperor while the northern branch at Qufu held the title Duke Yansheng. Kong Ruogu (孔若古), also known as Kong Chuan (孔傳) 47th generation was claimed to be the ancestor of the Southern branch after Kong Zhu died by Northern branch member Kong Guanghuang.

=== Modern era ===
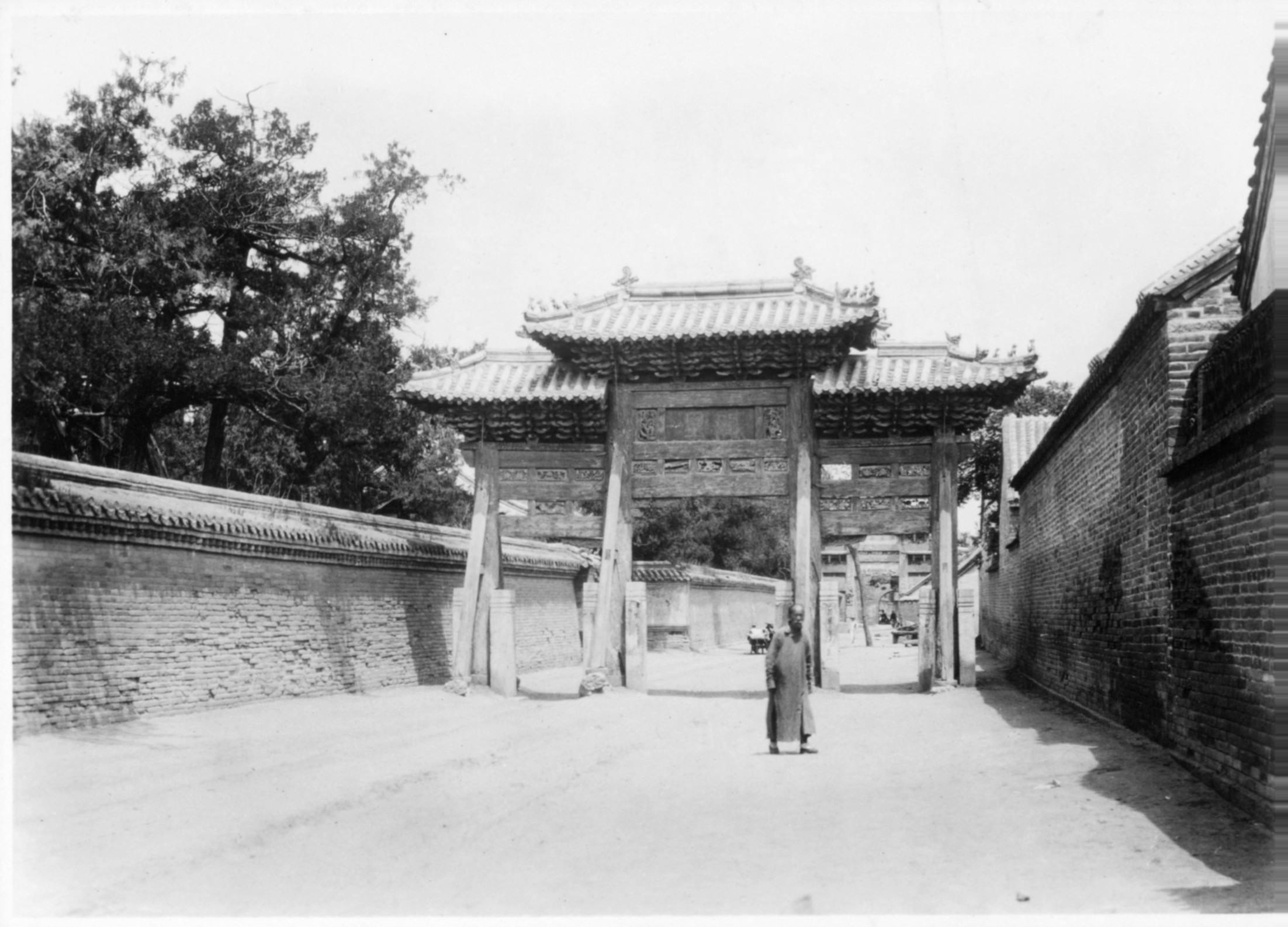
Queli Lane (闕里坊) of Qufu in 1929. Queli Lane was traditionally believed to be the birth place of Confucius

During the Late Qing reforms, the Qing government planned to construct a major railroad connecting the North and South, which was known as Tianjin–Pukou Railway (Jinpu Railway), and later merged into Beijing-Shanghai Railway. The originally planned route of the Tianjin–Pukou Railway did not pass through Yanzhou. Instead, it was designed to run from Nanyi, pass through Qufu, cross the Si River, and then proceed directly south to Zouxian and Tengxian. During actual construction, however, the route was altered on the grounds of protecting the Confucian Temple in Qufu: south of Xiemating in Qufu, the railway was diverted southwestward toward Yanzhou, and then turned southeast again south of Yanzhou, forming a large curve in the line.

The German-proposed plan that would have passed through Qufu would have placed the railway only 50 zhang (less than 200 meters) from the Confucius Cemetery (Konglin), which aroused dissatisfaction among some conservative figures, who believed it would damage the site’s feng shui. Moreover, since Qufu was rich in mineral resources, some suspected that Britain and Germany intended to exploit and transport local minerals by rail after the line’s completion. Subsequently, Kong Lingyi, the Duke Yansheng, encouraged by opponents of the proposal, submitted a formal petition citing the need to protect the "sacred veins of the Kong Forest". Following his intervention, the Governor of Shandong memorialized the superintendent of the Jin–Pu Railway, requesting that the original plan be altered to avoid the sacred forest. Local gentry also submitted a joint petition demanding a rerouting in order to protect local railway and mining rights. They argued that “Qufu is surrounded by mountains rich in minerals and has long attracted German attention. From Jining to Zou, however, the land becomes flat plains with no nearby minerals", and therefore insisted that the railway must be diverted westward.

Under mounting pressure, several officials responsible for the northern section of the Jinpu Railway personally traveled to Qufu to survey the route and agreed with Kong Lingyi to shift the line five li westward. Just as construction was about to begin, the magistrate of Ziyang County submitted another petition requesting that the line be routed around eastern Yanzhou to promote local ritual activities. Consequently, the railway authorities moved the line further west to its present alignment, surveyed and designated the site of Yanzhou Prefectural Station, acquired land for station construction, and agreed to build a branch line from Yanzhou to Jining. With this, the controversy over the railway’s rerouting was brought to an end. In 1910, Kong Lingyi was summoned to Beijing to express gratitude to the new emperor Puyi for his handling of the affair and was rewarded with permission to wear a sable-trimmed court robe (帶嗉貂褂).

Although the successful diversion of the railway away from Qufu County was celebrated by conservatives and by Kong Lingyi himself, their actions also drew criticism. Song Huanwu, principal of the Second Shandong Provincial Normal School, once remarked: "When construction of the Jinpu Railway was first proposed, it was originally planned to establish a station in Qufu city. The Duke Yansheng’s household, clinging to superstitious notions of feng shui, strongly opposed this, and the route was therefore changed to Yaocun, eighteen li away from the city. As a result, merchants and travelers were greatly inconvenienced. Consequently, social life within Qufu County remained in a medieval state and failed to undergo modernization."

In 1948, Qufu played a minor role in the Yanzhou Campaign of the Chinese Civil War.

=== In PRC ===
Current day's Qufu residential area

The artifacts of the historical sites at Qufu suffered extensive damage during the Cultural Revolution when about 200 staff members and students of Beijing Normal University led by Tan Houlan (谭厚兰, 1937–1982), one of the five most powerful student leaders of the Cultural Revolution, came to Qufu and destroyed more than 6,000 artifacts as part of the campaign to destroy the "Four Olds" in November 1966.

The city wall of Qufu was kept until being demolished in 1977; today only the due-south gate, the north gate, and portions of the wall remain. Restoration of the wall began in 2002 and was completed in September 2004.

Besides the renowned "Three Confucian Sites" (San Kong), Qufu is dotted, both within and beyond the city, with countless cultural relics and historic sites: the Temple of Yan Hui, Xixiahou Site, the Temple of the Duke of Zhou, the Chunqiu Academy, the Tombs of the Han Princes of Lu, the Mausoleum of Shaohao, Shimen Temple, and the former site of the Song-dynasty Jingling Palace, among others. In 1982 it was designated a National Famous Historical and Cultural City by the State Council of China.

In 1986 the county was abolished and reconstituted as a city, administered on behalf of the prefecture-level city of Jining.

== Administrative divisions ==
The city of Qufu is divided into 4 subdistricts, and 8 towns. The city government is located within Lucheng Subdistrict.

Township-Level Divisions of Qufu City
| English name | Pinyin | Hanzi | Subdivision Type |
|---|---|---|---|
| Lucheng Subdistrict | Lǔchéng Jiēdào | 鲁城街道 | Subdistrict |
| Shuyuan Subdistrict | Shūyuàn Jiēdào | 书院街道 | Subdistrict |
| Shizhuang Subdistrict | Shízhuāng Jiēdào | 时庄街道 | Subdistrict |
| Xiaoxue Subdistrict | Xiǎoxuě Jiēdào | 小雪街道 | Subdistrict |
| Wucun | Wúcūn Zhèn | 吴村镇 | Town |
| Yaocun, Qufu | Yáocūn Zhèn | 姚村镇 | Town |
| Lingcheng | Língchéng Zhèn | 陵城镇 | Town |
| Nishan | Níshān Zhèn | 尼山镇 | Town |
| Wangzhuang | Wángzhuāng Zhèn | 王庄镇 | Town |
| Xizou | Xīzōu Zhèn | 息陬镇 | Town |
| Shimenshan | Shíménshān Zhèn | 石门山镇 | Town |
| Fangshan | Fángshān Zhèn | 防山镇 | Town |

== Geography ==
The small historical center of Qufu is surrounded by the restored Ming-era city wall and rivers/moats. The Drum Tower (Gulou) is in the center of the walled city; the Temple of Confucius (Kong Miao), Confucius Mansion (Kong Fu) and the Temple of Yan Hui (Yan Miao) occupy large sections of the land within the wall.

The Confucius Cemetery (Kong Lin) is located 1.3 km (0.81 mi) to the north of the walled city. The modern downtown is located south of the walled city. There is also a mosque and a thriving Muslim neighborhood and market that is located just outside the west gate of the walled city.

The Qufu train station and major industrial areas are on the east side, a few kilometers east of the historical city. The Shaohao Tomb (少昊陵; Shǎohào Líng) and Shou Qiu historical site (寿丘; Shòu Qiū, the purported birthplace of the legendary Yellow Emperor), are on the eastern outskirts of the modern Qufu as well, near Jiuxian village.

The town of Shimenshan in Qufu is part of the international Cittaslow movement in China.

The Si River and the Yi River both pass through the city.

=== Climate ===
Qufu has a humid continental climate, bordering on a humid subtropical climate. Qufu experiences an average annual precipitation of 666.3 mm (26.23 in), and an average annual temperature of 13.6 °C (56.5 °F).

Climate data for Qufu, elevation 62 m (203 ft), (1991–2020 normals, extremes 1981–present)
| Month | Jan | Feb | Mar | Apr | May | Jun | Jul | Aug | Sep | Oct | Nov | Dec | Year |
|---|---|---|---|---|---|---|---|---|---|---|---|---|---|
| Record high °C (°F) | 16.1 (61.0) | 23.1 (73.6) | 27.5 (81.5) | 32.7 (90.9) | 36.7 (98.1) | 39.4 (102.9) | 41.0 (105.8) | 38.8 (101.8) | 36.2 (97.2) | 35.6 (96.1) | 26.0 (78.8) | 18.8 (65.8) | 41.0 (105.8) |
| Mean daily maximum °C (°F) | 5.1 (41.2) | 8.9 (48.0) | 14.9 (58.8) | 21.6 (70.9) | 27.1 (80.8) | 31.6 (88.9) | 32.2 (90.0) | 31.1 (88.0) | 27.5 (81.5) | 21.7 (71.1) | 13.6 (56.5) | 6.8 (44.2) | 20.2 (68.3) |
| Daily mean °C (°F) | 0.0 (32.0) | 3.4 (38.1) | 9.3 (48.7) | 15.9 (60.6) | 21.6 (70.9) | 26.2 (79.2) | 27.7 (81.9) | 26.6 (79.9) | 22.2 (72.0) | 15.8 (60.4) | 8.1 (46.6) | 1.8 (35.2) | 14.9 (58.8) |
| Mean daily minimum °C (°F) | −3.8 (25.2) | −1.0 (30.2) | 4.3 (39.7) | 10.5 (50.9) | 16.2 (61.2) | 21.0 (69.8) | 23.8 (74.8) | 22.8 (73.0) | 17.8 (64.0) | 11.2 (52.2) | 4.0 (39.2) | −1.9 (28.6) | 10.4 (50.7) |
| Record low °C (°F) | −17.8 (0.0) | −13.7 (7.3) | −9.8 (14.4) | −1.7 (28.9) | 4.0 (39.2) | 11.5 (52.7) | 16.6 (61.9) | 12.7 (54.9) | 7.0 (44.6) | −2.0 (28.4) | −11.9 (10.6) | −14.8 (5.4) | −17.8 (0.0) |
| Average precipitation mm (inches) | 7.6 (0.30) | 11.8 (0.46) | 16.6 (0.65) | 35.9 (1.41) | 55.9 (2.20) | 87.8 (3.46) | 196.3 (7.73) | 172.3 (6.78) | 65.7 (2.59) | 31.0 (1.22) | 28.4 (1.12) | 9.9 (0.39) | 719.2 (28.31) |
| Average precipitation days (≥ 0.1 mm) | 2.8 | 3.7 | 3.5 | 5.4 | 6.2 | 7.6 | 11.6 | 10.5 | 6.9 | 5.2 | 4.9 | 3.3 | 71.6 |
| Average snowy days | 2.4 | 2.6 | 0.7 | 0.1 | 0 | 0 | 0 | 0 | 0 | 0 | 0.8 | 1.6 | 8.2 |
| Average relative humidity (%) | 61 | 57 | 53 | 56 | 59 | 60 | 75 | 77 | 71 | 67 | 68 | 65 | 64 |
| Mean monthly sunshine hours | 156.5 | 158.3 | 205.1 | 230.6 | 251.0 | 227.6 | 202.5 | 201.8 | 188.3 | 185.0 | 160.7 | 154.8 | 2,322.2 |
| Percentage possible sunshine | 50 | 51 | 55 | 59 | 58 | 52 | 46 | 49 | 51 | 54 | 53 | 51 | 52 |
Source: China Meteorological Administration all-time August record high

== Transportation ==
=== Rail transport ===
The original Beijing–Shanghai railway, constructed in the early 20th century, passes through Qufu. For a century, most passengers traveling to or from Qufu, would use the train station at Yanzhou, some 15 km (9.3 mi) to the west.

The Yanshi Railway, which connects Yanzhou and Rizhao as part of the broader Xinshi Railway (新石铁路), passes through the city. A small passenger station operating on the southeast side of the city (35.582860°N 117.025091°E) serves this line.

The north–south Beijing–Shanghai high-speed railway, which opened in 2011, runs through Qufu. This line's Qufu East railway station is located a few kilometers south-east of the city (35.556390°N 117.063656°E). Qufu South railway station, on the east–west Rizhao–Lankao high-speed railway, opened in 2021.

=== Road transport ===
China National Highway 104 and China National Highway 327 both pass through Qufu.

=== Monorail ===
A 12 km (7.5 mi), 12 station monorail to connect Qufu and Zoucheng began construction in the first half of 2017, however construction was halted. A 6.3 km (3.9 mi) section was due to be completed in January 2018 to allow for testing to commence. The complete line was originally due to open in 2018. As of July 2021 the local government hopes to complete the line.

== Sites related with Confucius ==
Temple and Cemetery of Confucius and the Kong Family Mansion in Qufu
UNESCO World Heritage Site
- Plaque at the entrance of the site
- Interactive map of Temple and Cemetery of Confucius and the Kong Family Mansion in Qufu
- Criteria: Cultural: i, iv, vi
- Reference: 704
- Inscription: 1994 (18th Session)

Since 1994, the Temple of Confucius (Chinese: 孔庙; pinyin: Kǒng Miào) has been part of the UNESCO World Heritage Site "Temple and Cemetery of Confucius and the Kong Family Mansion in Qufu". The two other parts of the site are the nearby Kong Family Mansion (Chinese: 孔府; pinyin: Kǒng Fǔ), where the main-line descendants of Confucius lived, and the Cemetery of Confucius (Chinese: 孔林; pinyin: Kǒng Lín) a couple kilometers to the north, where Confucius and many of his descendants have been buried. Those three sites are collectively known in Qufu as San Kong (三孔), i.e. "The Three Confucian [sites]".

=== Temple of Confucius (Kong Miao) ===
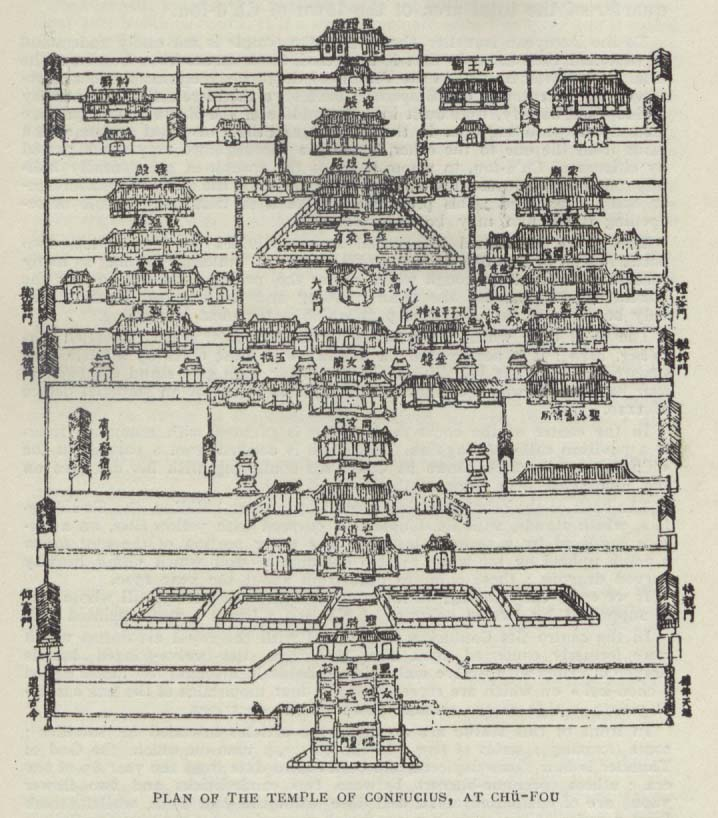
Historical plan of the Temple of Confucius (1912).

Within two years after the death of Confucius, his former house in Qufu was already consecrated as a temple by the Duke of Lu. In 205 BC, Emperor Liu Bang of the Han dynasty was the first emperor to offer sacrifices to the memory of Confucius in Qufu. He set an example for many emperors and high officials to follow. Later, emperors would visit Qufu after their enthronement or on important occasions such as a successful war. In total, 12 different emperors paid 20 personal visits to Qufu to worship Confucius. About 100 others sent their deputies for 196 official visits. The original three-room house of Confucius was removed from the temple complex during a rebuilding undertaken in 611 AD. In 1012 and in 1094, during the Song dynasty, the temple was extended into a design with three sections and four courtyards, around which eventually more than 400 rooms were arranged. Fire and vandalism destroyed the temple in 1214, during the Jin dynasty. It was restored to its former extent by the year 1302 during the Yuan dynasty. Shortly thereafter, in 1331, the temple was framed in an enclosure wall modelled on the Imperial palace. After another devastation by fire in 1499, the temple was finally restored to its present scale. In 1724, yet another fire destroyed the main hall and the sculptures it contained. The subsequent restoration was completed in 1730. Many of the replacement sculptures were again destroyed during the Cultural Revolution in 1966. In total, the Temple of Confucius has undergone 15 major renovations, 31 large repairs, and numerous small building measures.

The temple complex is the second largest historical building complex in China (after the Forbidden City)—it covers an area of 16,000 square metres (170,000 sq ft) and has a total of 460 rooms. Because the last major redesign following the fire in 1499 took place shortly after the building of the Forbidden City in the Ming dynasty, the architecture of the Temple of Confucius resembles that of the Forbidden City in many ways. The main part of the temple consists of 9 courtyards arranged on a central axis, which is oriented in the north–south direction and is 1.3 kilometres (0.81 mi) in length. The first three courtyards have small gates and are planted with tall pine trees, they serve an introductory function. The first (southernmost) gate is named "Lingxing Gate" after a star in the Great Bear constellation, the name suggests that Confucius is a star from heaven. The buildings in the remaining courtyards form the heart of the complex. They are impressive structures with yellow roof-tiles (otherwise reserved for the emperor) and red-painted walls, they are surrounded by dark-green pine trees to create a color contrast with complementary colors. The main buildings are the Stele Pavilions (e.g., Jin and Yuan dynasties, 1115–1368), the Kuiwen Hall (built in 1018, restored in 1504 during the Ming dynasty and in 1985), the Xing Tan Pavilion (simplified Chinese: 杏坛; traditional Chinese: 杏壇; pinyin: Xìng Tán, Apricot Platform), the De Mu Tian Di Arch, the Dacheng Hall (built in the Qing dynasty), and the Hall of Confucius' Wife. The Dacheng Hall (Chinese: 大成殿; pinyin: Dàchéng diàn, Great Perfection Hall) is the architectural center of the present day complex. The hall covers an area of 54 by 34 metres (177 by 112 ft) and stands slightly less than 32 m (105 ft) tall.

It is supported by 28 richly decorated pillars, each 6 m (20 ft) high and 0.8 m (2 ft 7 in) in diameter and carved in one piece out of local rock. The ten columns on the front side of the hall are decorated with coiled dragons. It is said that these columns were covered during visits by the emperor in order not to arouse his envy. Dacheng Hall served as the principal place for offering sacrifices to the memory of Confucius. In the center of the courtyard in front of Dacheng Hall stands the "Apricot Platform", which commemorates Confucius teaching his students under an apricot tree. Each year at Qufu and at many other Confucian temples a ceremony is held on September 28 to commemorate Confucius' birthday.

=== Cemetery of Confucius (Kong Lin) ===
Tomb of Confucius in 1929

Tomb of Confucius, where cracks made by Red Guards can be seen

The Cemetery of Confucius (孔林; Kǒng Lín) lies to the north of the town of Qufu. The oldest graves found in this location date back to the Zhou dynasty. The original tomb erected here in memory of Confucius on the bank of the Sishui River had the shape of an axe. In addition, it had a brick platform for sacrifices. The present-day tomb is a cone-shaped hill. Tombs for the descendants of Confucius and additional stela to commemorate him were soon added around Confucius' tomb.

Since Confucius' descendants were conferred noble titles and were given imperial princesses as wives, many of the tombs in the cemetery show the status symbols of noblemen. Tombstones came in use during the Han dynasty, today, there are about 3,600 tombstones dating from the Song, Yuan, Ming and Qing dynasties still standing in the cemetery.

In 1331 construction work began on the wall and gate of the cemetery. In total, the cemetery has undergone 13 renovations and extensions. Eventually, by the late 18th century, the perimeter wall reached a length of 7.5 km (4.7 mi), enclosing an area of 3.6 square kilometres (1.4 sq mi). In this space, the tombs of more than 100,000 descendants of Confucius, who have been buried there over a period of about 2000 years, can be found. The oldest graves date back to the Zhou dynasty, the most recent of which belong to descendants in the 76th and 78th generation.

During the Cultural Revolution, the Kong family cemetery was branded a "reactionary" site and was subject to vandalism and desecration. The tombs of Confucius and his descendants were dug up, looted and flattened. Confucius statue was pulled down and paraded through the streets. According to statistics published after the Cultural Revolution, 100,000 volumes of classical texts were burned, 6,618 cultural artefacts were destroyed or damaged, one thousand stelae were smashed, 5,000 ancient pines were felled and over 2,000 graves were dug up during the period. The corpse of the 76th Duke of Qufu was removed from its grave, hung naked from a tree in front of the palace and later incinerated.

More than 10,000 mature trees give the cemetery a forest-like appearance. A road runs from the north gate of Qufu to the exterior gate of the cemetery in a straight line. It is 1,266 m (4,154 ft) in length and lined by cypresses and pine trees. Along this road lies the Yan Temple, dedicated to Confucius' favorite student.

=== Kong Family Mansion (Kong Fu) ===
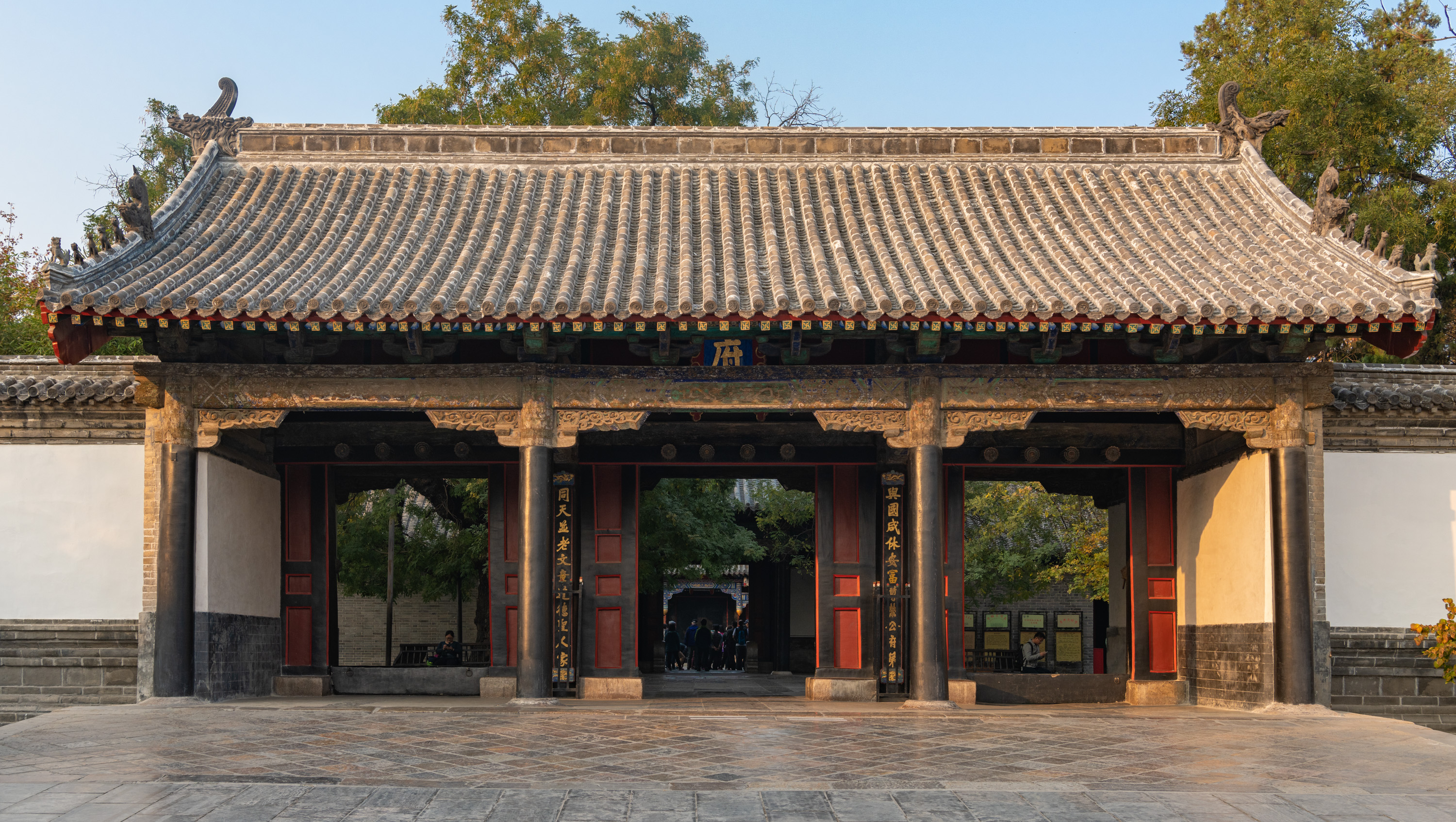
Main gate of Kong Family Mansion.

The direct descendants of Confucius lived in the Kong family Mansion (孔府; Kǒng Fǔ) located to the east of the temple. They were in charge of tending to the temple and cemetery. In particular, they were in charge of conducting elaborate religious ceremonies on occasions such as plantings, harvests, honoring the dead, and birthdays. The Kong family was in control of the largest private rural estate in China. The first mansion was built in 1038 during the Song dynasty and was originally connected directly to the temple. During a rebuilding in 1377 directed by the first Ming dynasty emperor, it was moved a short distance away from the temple. In 1503, it was expanded into three rows of buildings with 560 rooms and—like the Confucius Temple—9 courtyards. The mansion underwent a complete renovation in 1838 only to perish in a fire 47 years later in 1887. It was rebuilt two years later; the cost of both 19th-century renovations was covered by the Emperor. Today, the mansion comprises 152 buildings with 480 rooms, which cover an area of 12,470 square metres (134,200 sq ft). Its tallest structure is the four-story refuge tower (避难楼; Bìnán Lóu) that was designed as a shelter during an attack but was never used. The family mansion was inhabited by descendants of Confucius until 1937, when Confucius' descendant in the 76th and 77th generations fled to Chongqing during the Second Sino-Japanese War and later during the Chinese Civil War to Taiwan, where the head of the family still resides.

The layout of the mansion is traditionally Chinese, it separates official rooms in the front from the residential quarters in the rear. Furthermore, the spatial distribution of the buildings according to the seniority, gender, and status of their inhabitants reflects the Confucian principle of order and hierarchy: The most senior descendant of Confucius took up residence in the central of the three main buildings; his younger brother occupied the Yi Gun hall to the east.

=== Digital Confucian Culture Project ===
In Qufu, the birthplace of Confucius, a "Digital Confucian Culture Protection Project" is underway. This initiative involves the high-resolution 3D scanning of ancient temples, cemeteries, and archival documents to create a comprehensive digital archive for preservation, research, and virtual access.

== Economy ==
Qufu's economy consists of a number different industries. Agriculture, specifically grain production, is a major industry for the city. The other main industries are food processing, textile, construction materials, chemical, coal mining, pharmacy, paper making and industrial machinery. Qufu has also benefited greatly from tourism, holding a number of cultural festivals and exhibitions, largely centered around Confucius.

=== Natural resources ===
The city's main mineral deposits include coal, phosphorus, and limestone.

== Education ==
Qufu Normal University is located in Qufu city, and has an additional campus in Rizhao. The university, founded in 1955, offers 87 undergraduate majors, 25 master's degrees, and 11 doctoral degrees.

== Religion ==
Qufu is a traditional centre of Confucianism, being the area where Confucius was born. The city is home to the holiest Temple of Confucius, to the Mausoleum of Confucius and to the Mansion of the Kong Family. The city also has a branch of the Holy Church of Confucius (孔圣堂; Kǒngshèngtáng) and hosts the headquarters of the Federation of Confucian Culture.

== Gallery ==
The Temple of Confucius

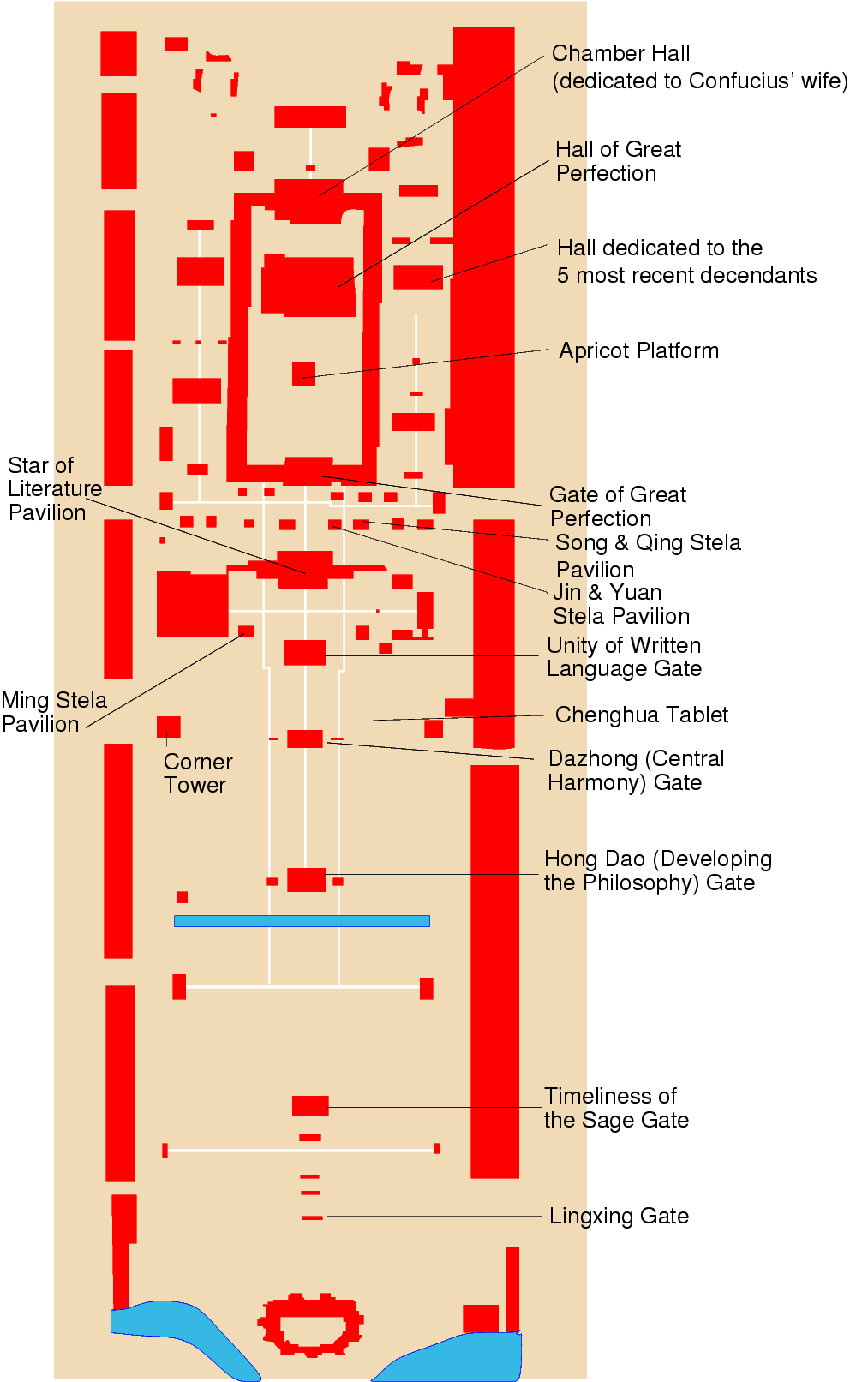
Plan of the Temple of Confucius

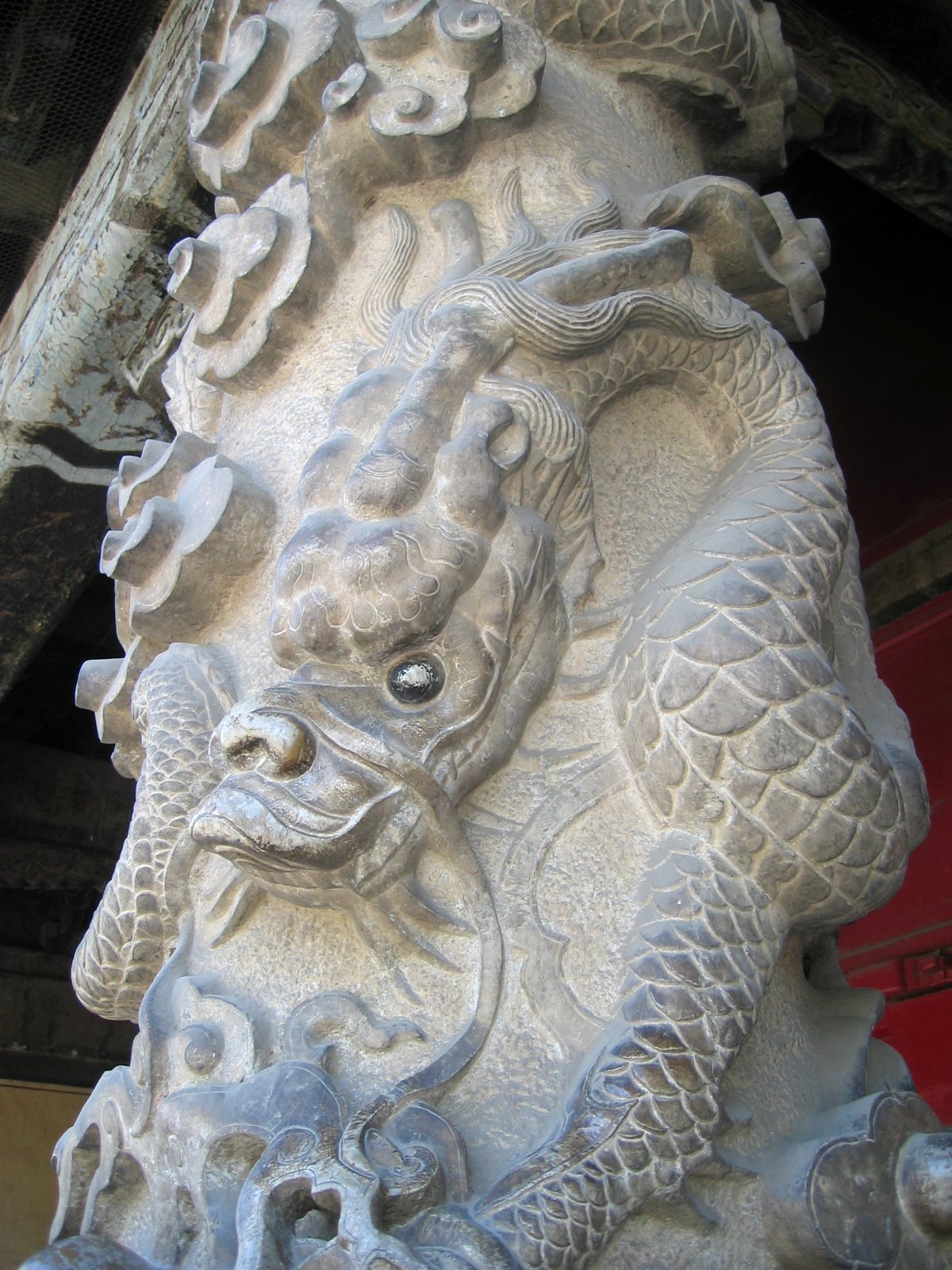
Dragon pillar in front of Dacheng Hall (Temple of Confucius)

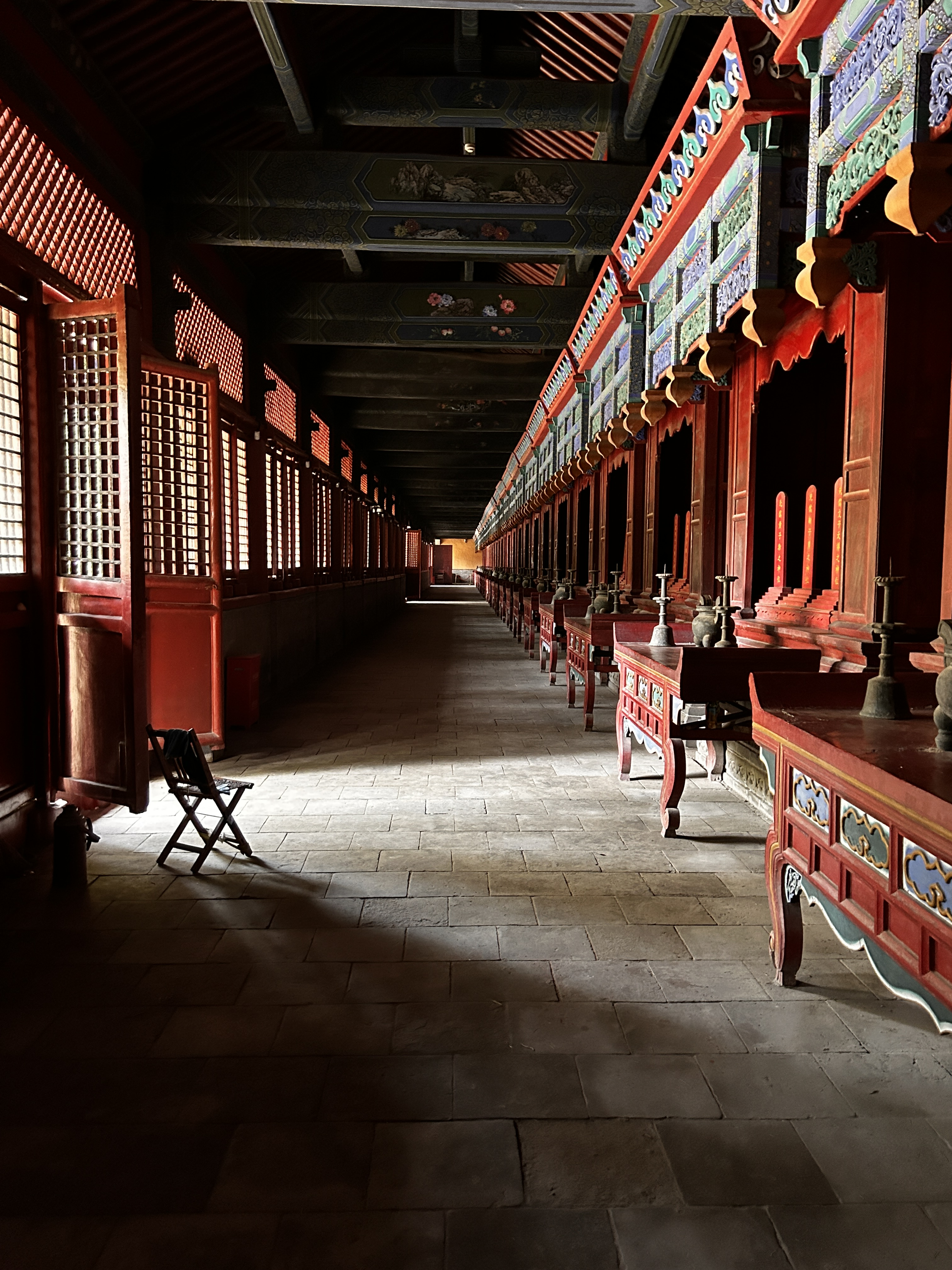
Sacrifice hall

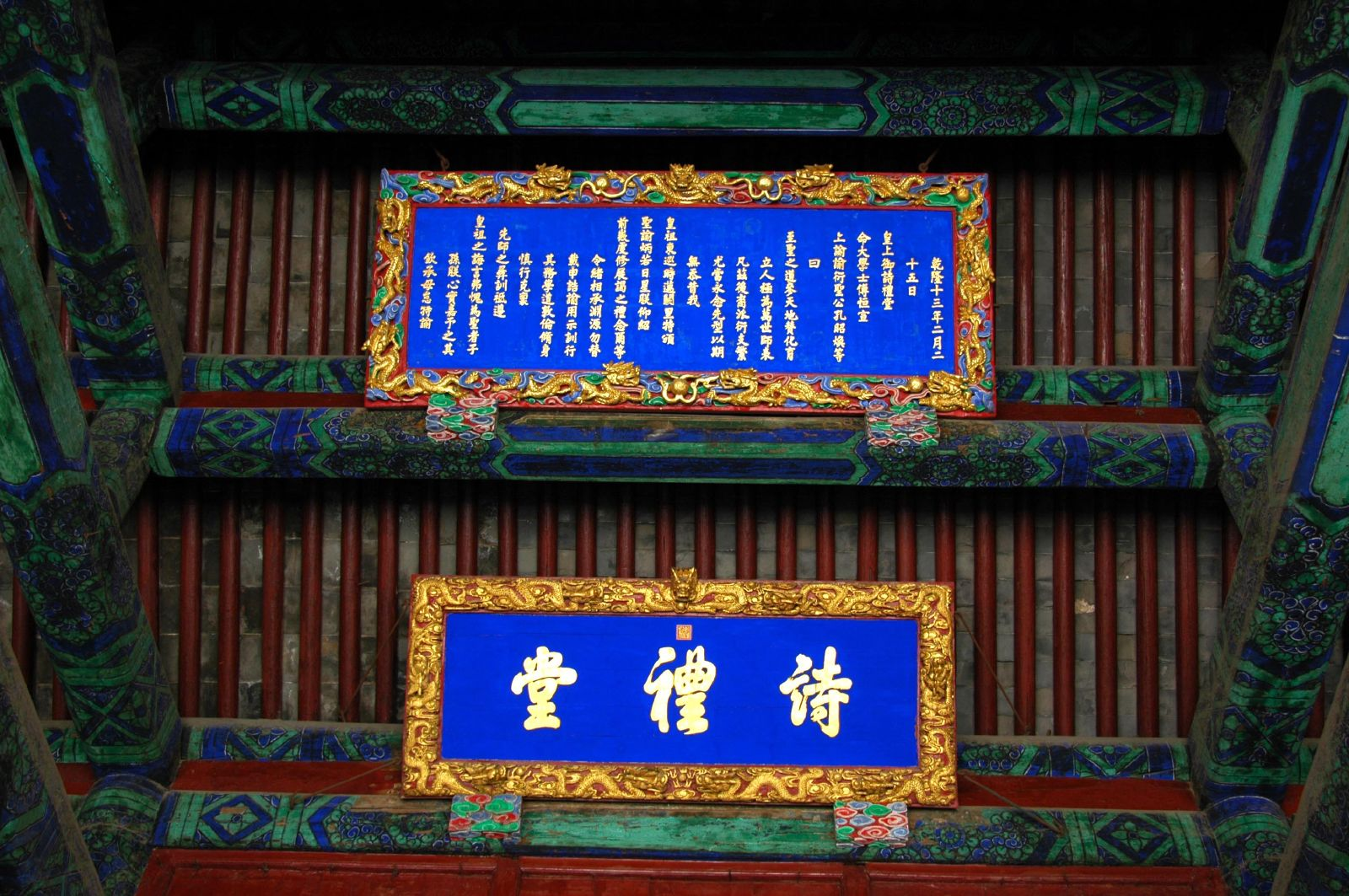
Commemorative plaque given by Qianlong Emperor
The Temple of Yan Hui

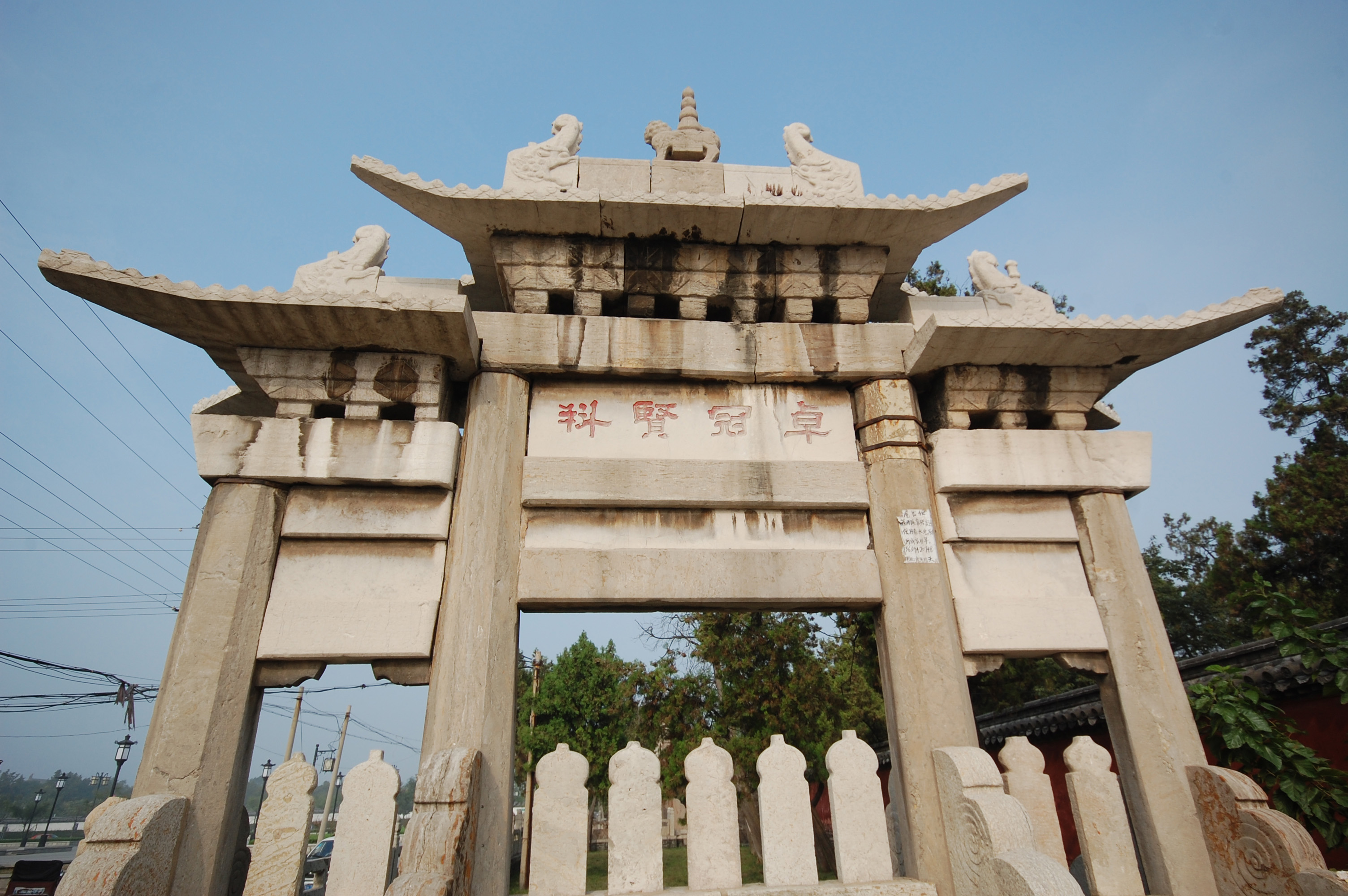
A gateway

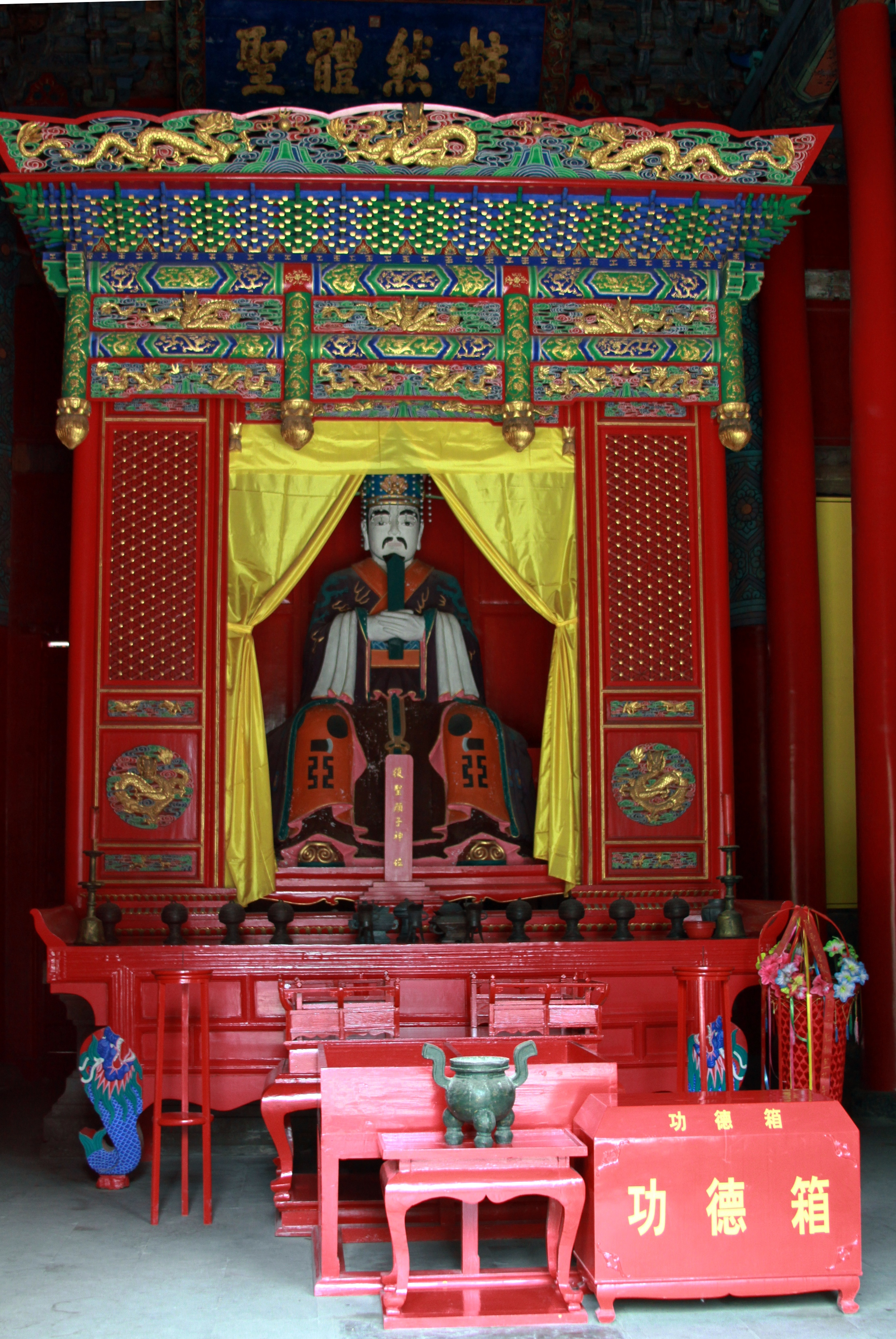
The sanctuary

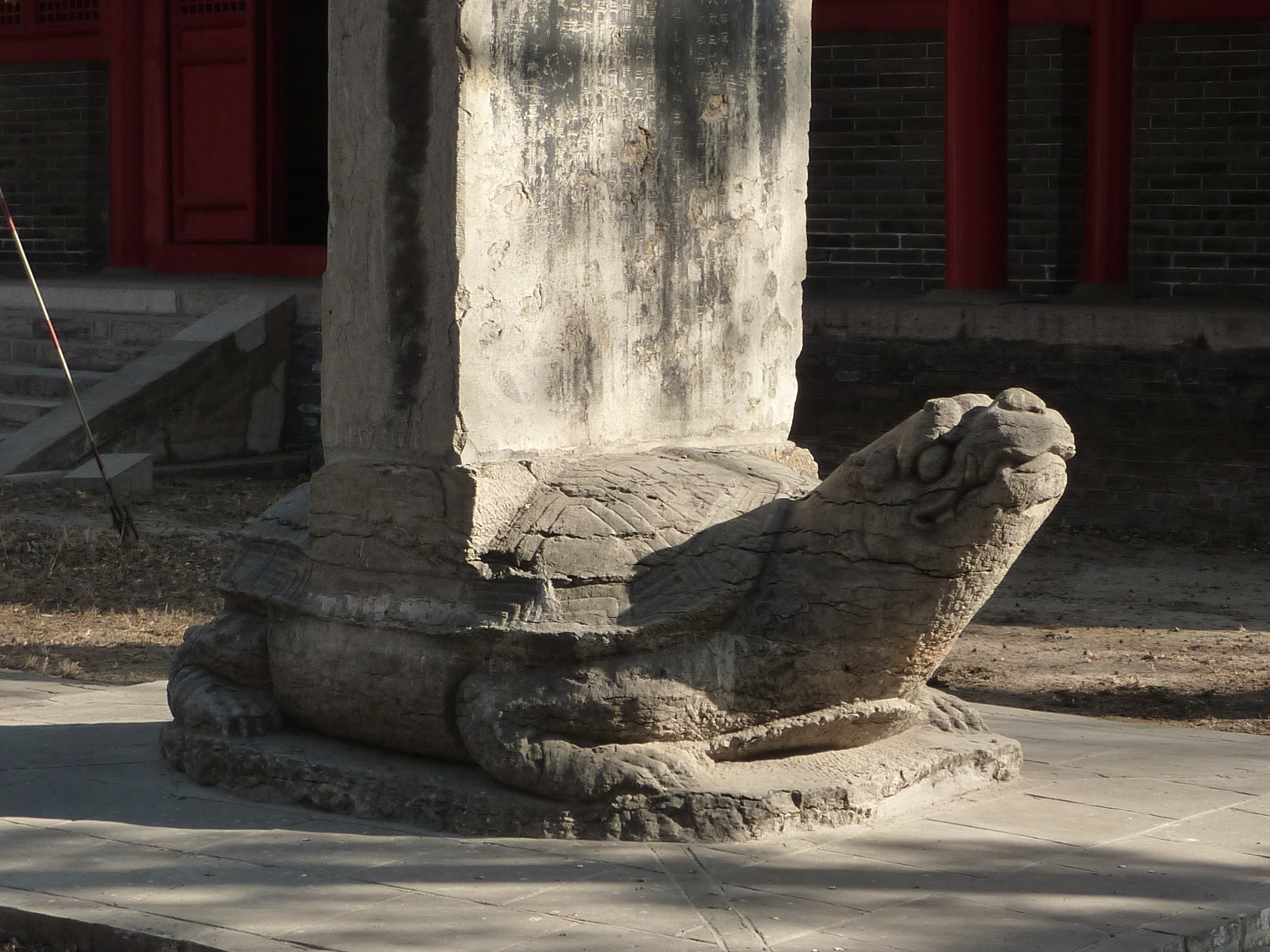
Stele in memory of rebuilding the temple, Year 9 of Zhizheng era (1349)

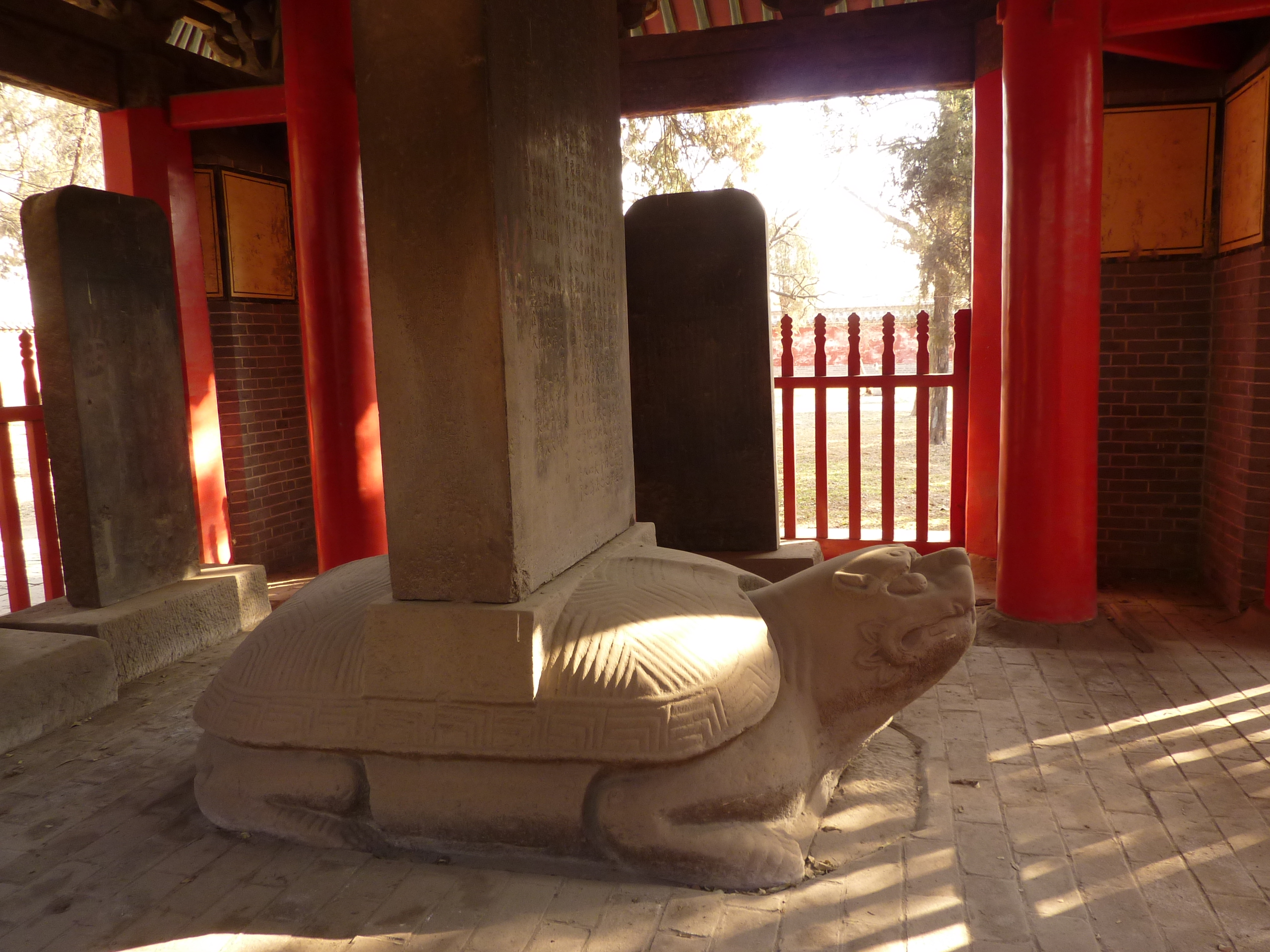
Stele in memory of rebuilding the temple, Year 6 of Zhengtong era (1441)

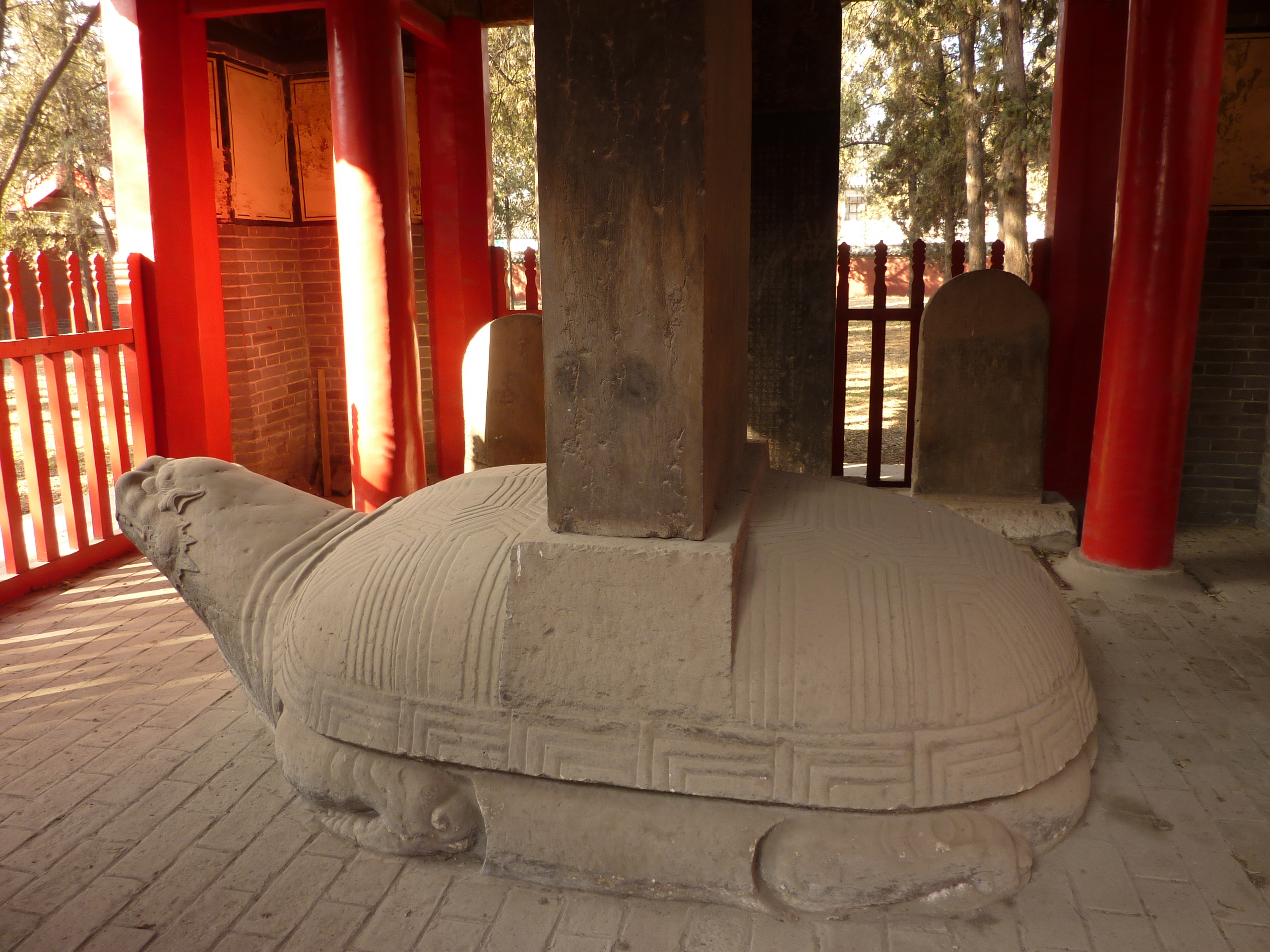
Stele in memory of rebuilding the temple, Year 4 of Zhengde era (1509)
The Cemetery of Confucius

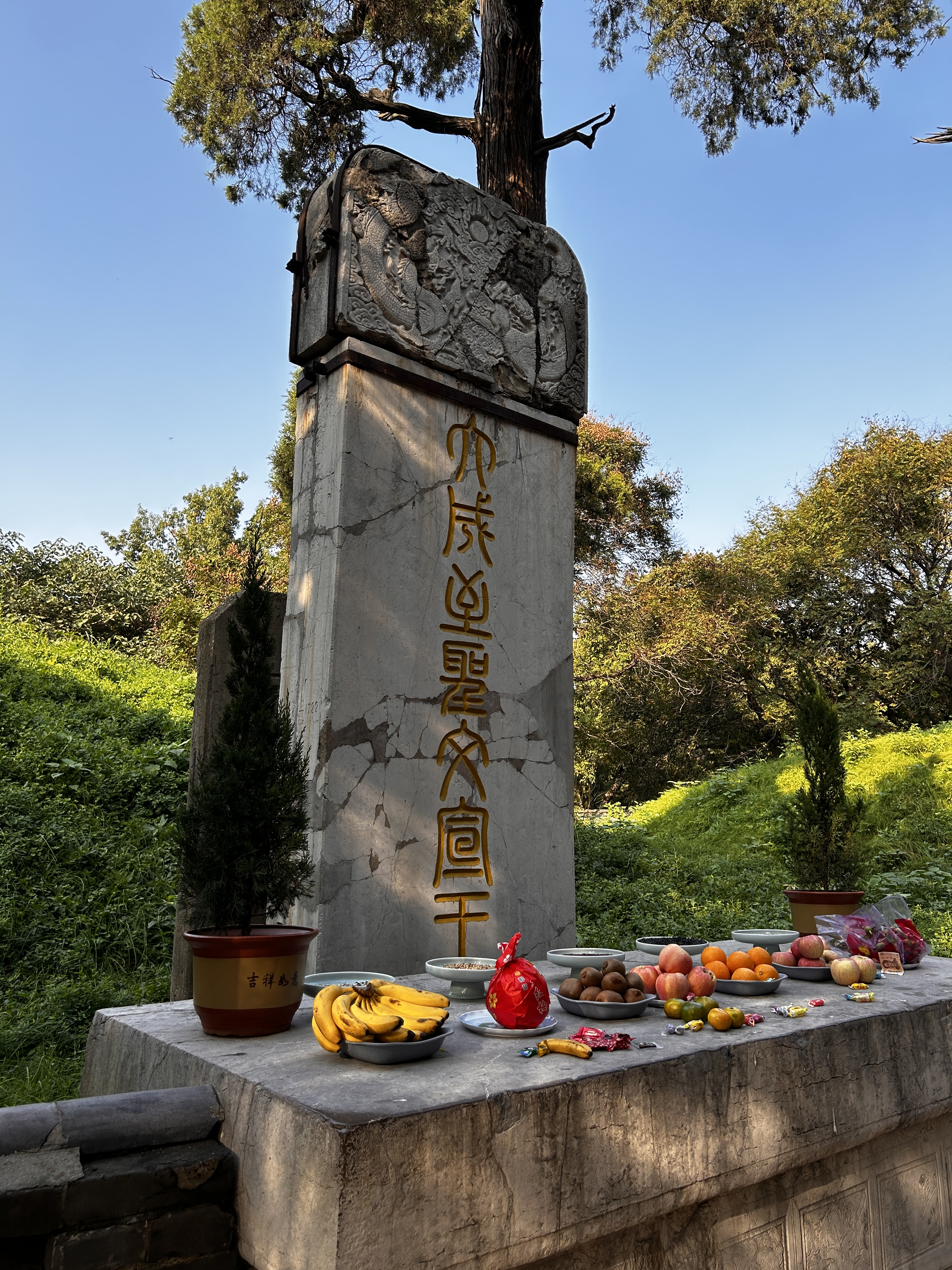
Grave of Confucius

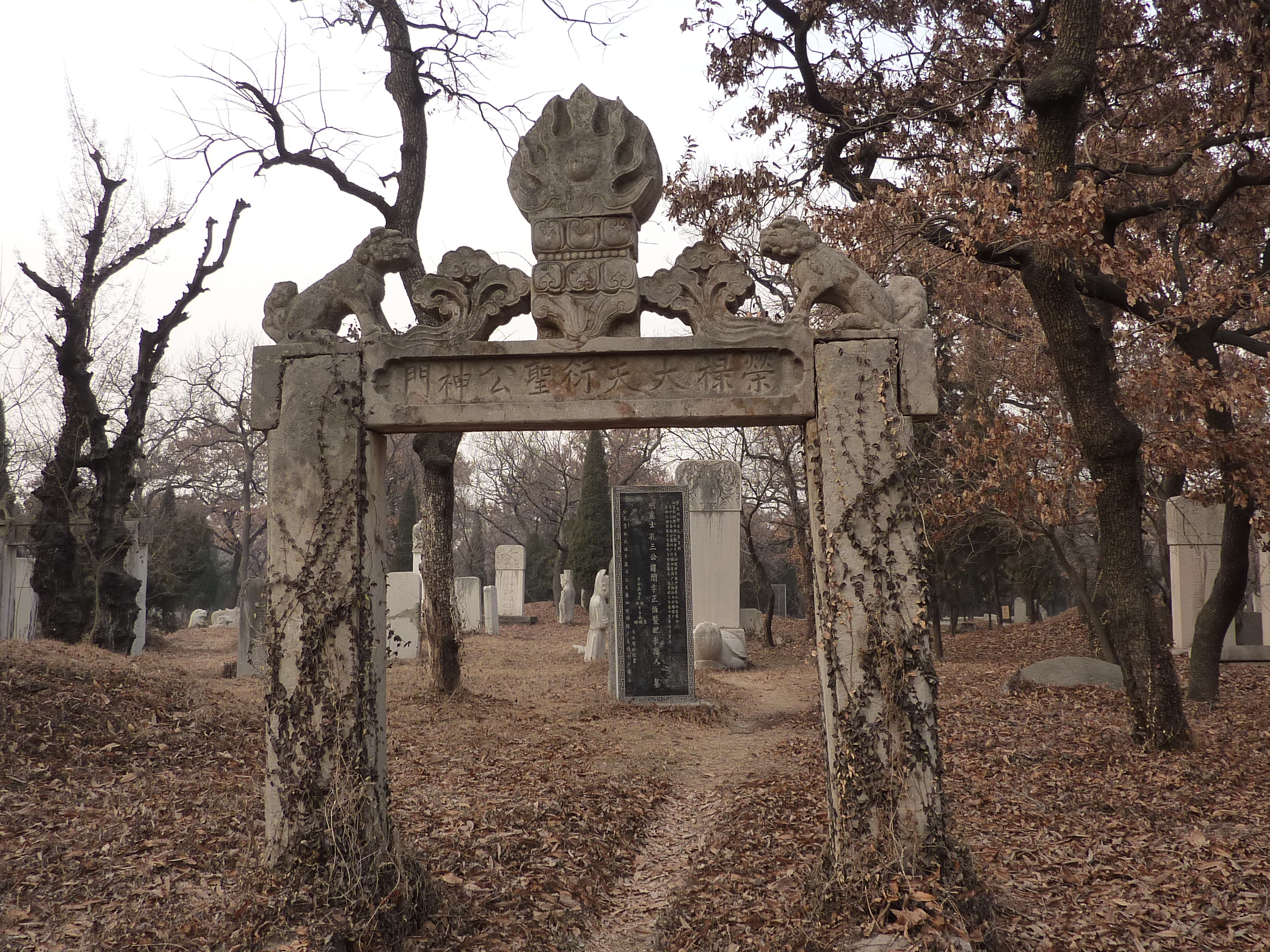
Spirit way of Kong Yanjin

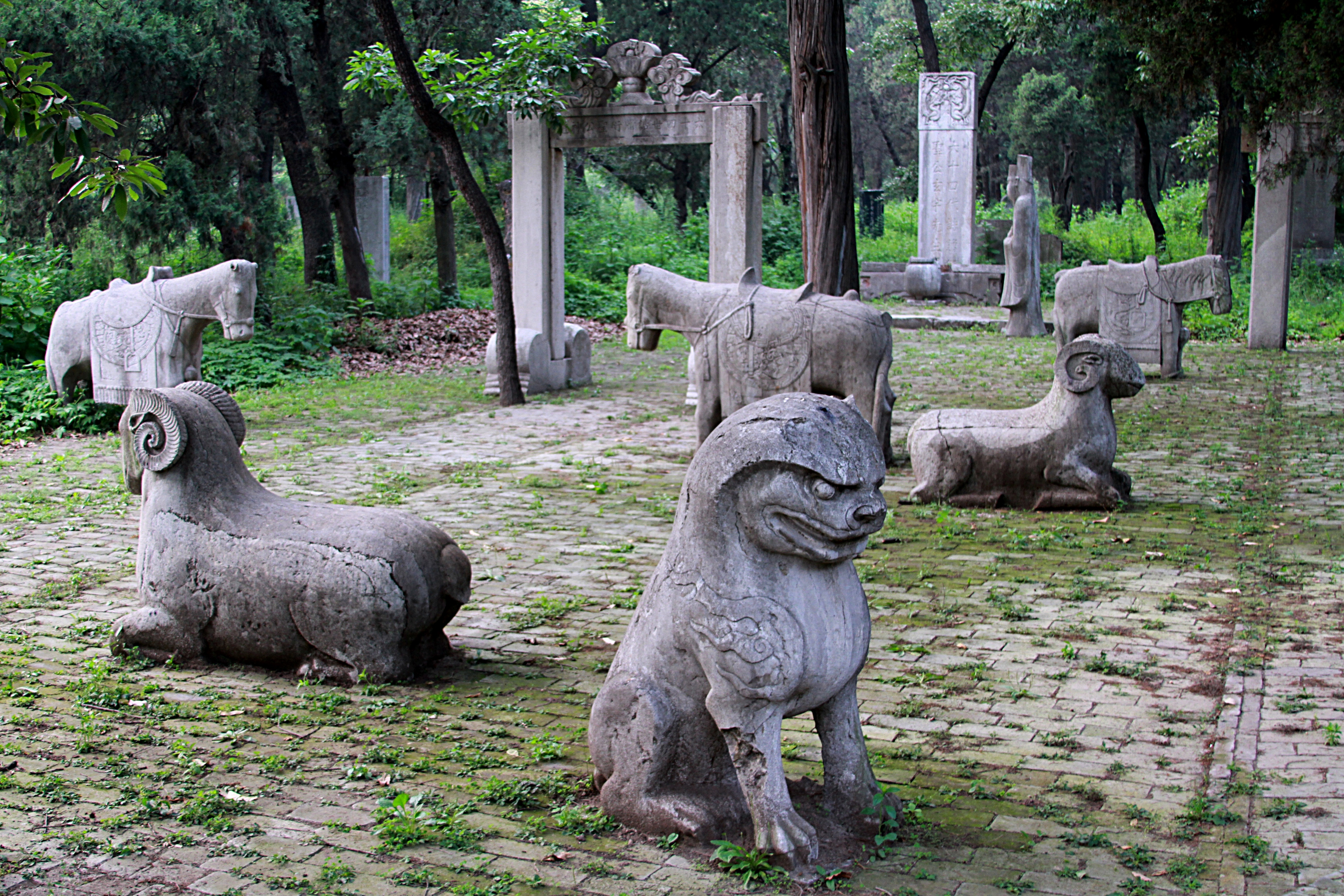
Spirit way of Kong Shangtan

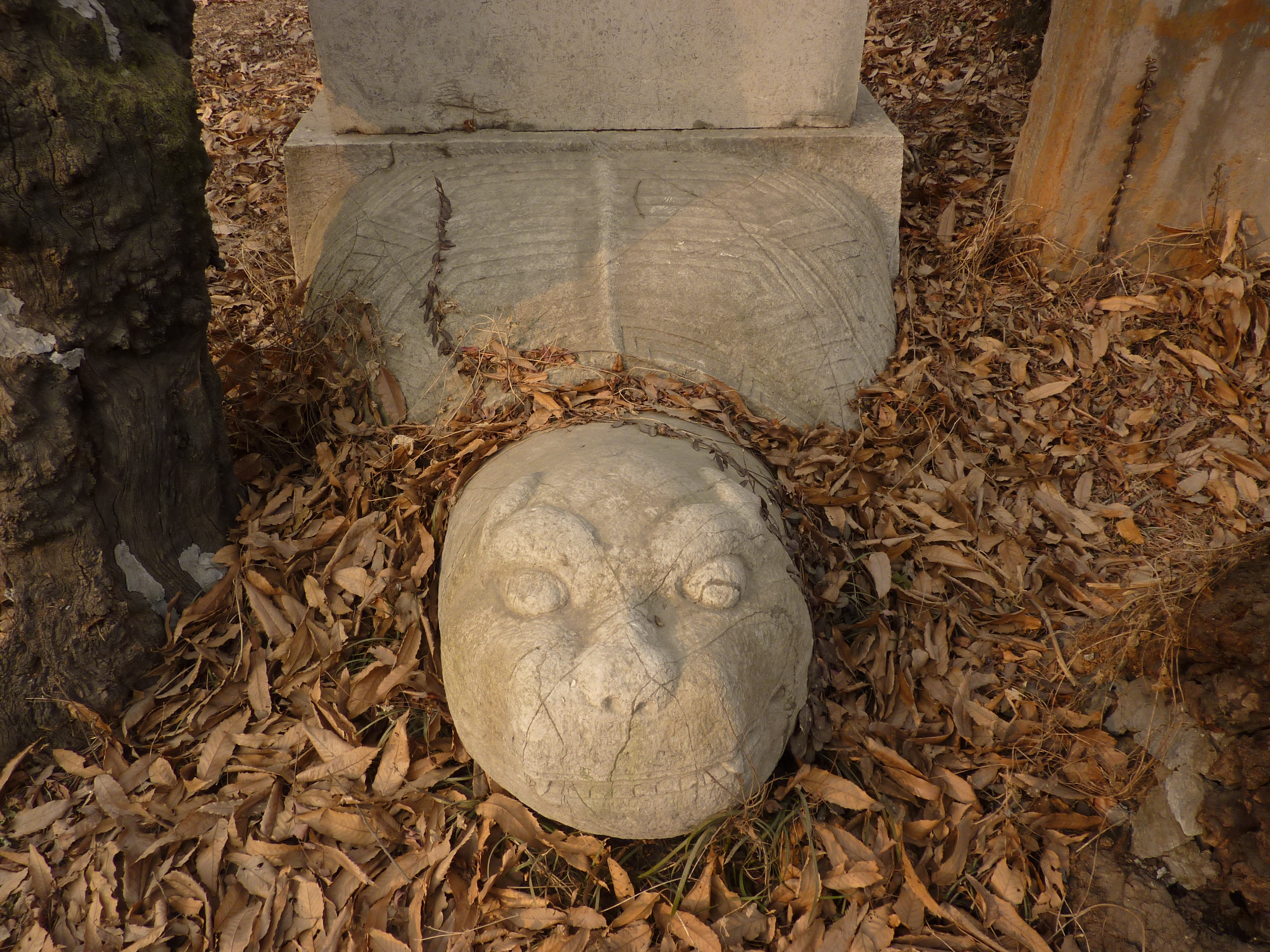
Bixi of Kong Hongtai

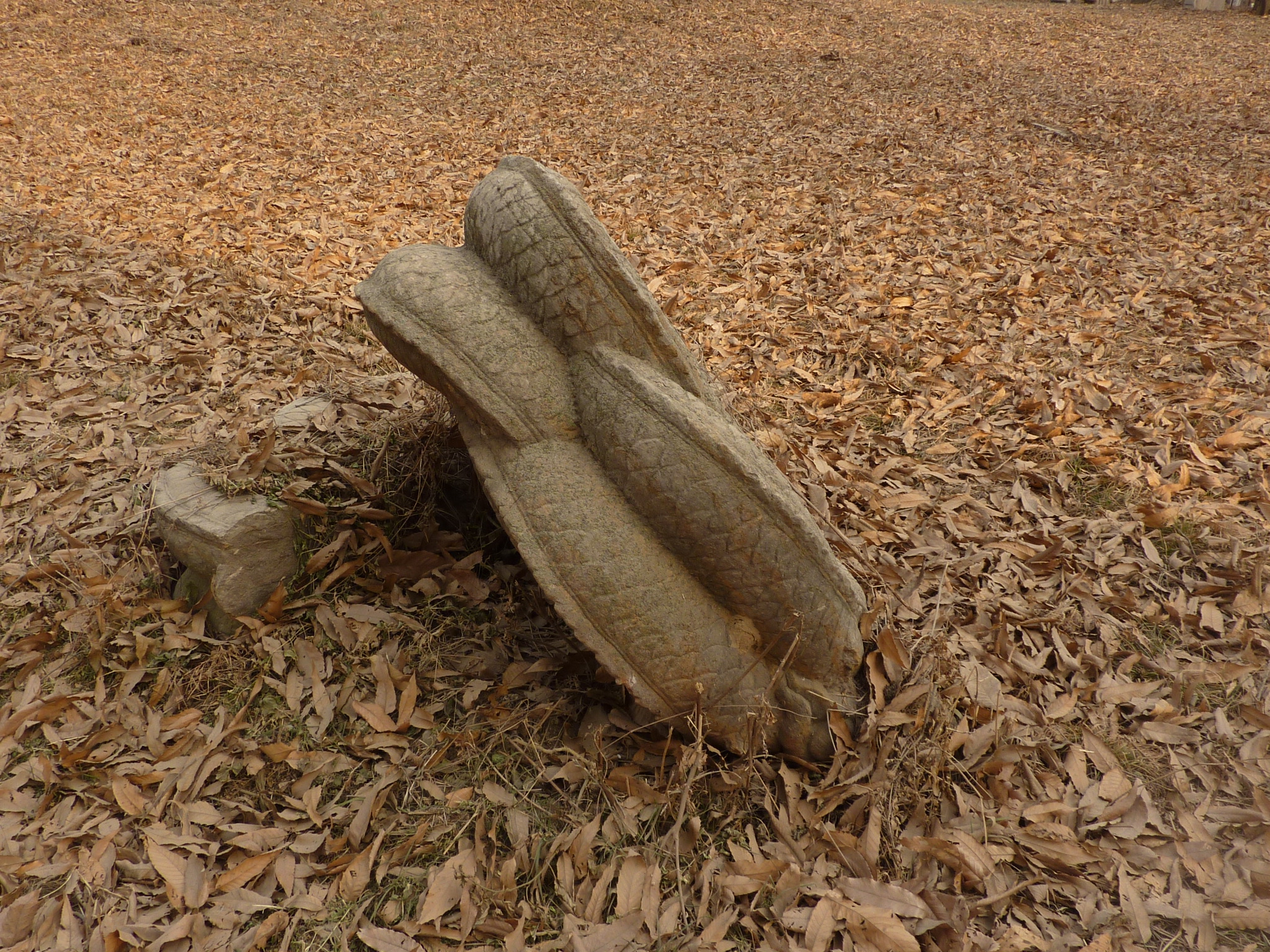
"Lost" crown of a Ming-era stele
Other sights

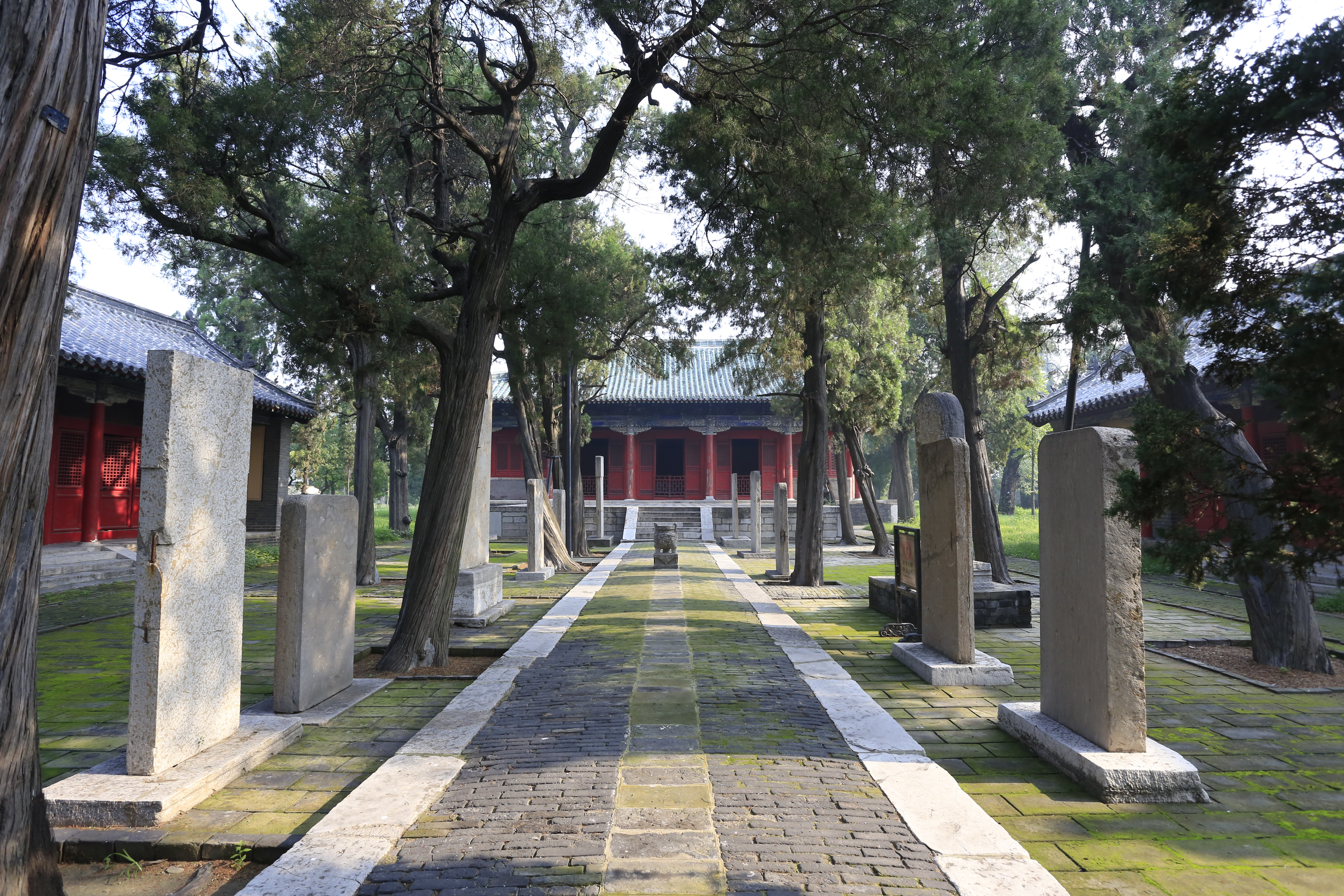
The Temple of Duke Zhou

Cemetery of Mencius's parents

Qufu city wall

Daxue Hall of Sacred Land of Mount Ni

== Sister cities ==
- Taku, Saga Prefecture, Japan
- Davis, United States
- Andong, South Korea

== See also ==
- Mount Ni, traditionally believed to be the site of the birth of Confucius
- Zoucheng, hometown of Mencius
- Qu (surname 曲), many people with this surname are from Shandong.
