= Bowuzhi =

Compendium of Chinese stories about natural wonders and marvelous phenomena (c. 290 CE)

Chinese name
- Chinese: 博物志
- Literal meaning: extensive things record
Transcriptions
Standard Mandarin
- Hanyu Pinyin: Bówùzhì
- Wade–Giles: Po-wu chih
Yue: Cantonese
- Jyutping: Bok^{3}mat^{6}zi^{3}
Southern Min
- Hokkien POJ: Phok-bu̍ttsì
Middle Chinese
- Middle Chinese: Pakmjuttsyi
Old Chinese
- Baxter–Sagart (2014): Pˤakmuttə-s

Korean name
- Hangul: 박물지
- Hanja: 博物志
Transcriptions
- McCune–Reischauer: Pakmulchi

Japanese name
- Kanji: 博物志
- Hiragana: はくぶつし
Transcriptions
- Revised Hepburn: Hakubutsushi

The pages of a printed edition of Bowuzhi

Bowuzhi (Chinese: 博物志; trans. "Records of Diverse Matters") by Zhang Hua (c. 290 CE) was a compendium of Chinese stories about natural wonders and marvelous phenomena. It quotes from many early Chinese classics, and diversely includes subject matter from Chinese mythology, history, geography, and folklore. The Bowuzhi, which is one of the first works in the literary genre of zhiguai "tales of anomalies; supernatural stories", records the earliest versions of several myths, such as the white yenü 野女 "wild women" living south of China in a society without men. Scholars have described the Bowuzhi as "a miscellany of scientific interest" and "an important minor classic".

== Author ==
The Bowuzhi author Zhang Hua (232-300) was a Western Jin dynasty (266-316) scholar, poet, and protoscientist. His biography in the (644) Book of Jin depicts Zhang Hua as a fangshi "master of esoterica" who was especially skilled at numerological arts, and a voracious collector of books, especially ones "strange, secret, and rarely seen". Many anecdotes in Six Dynasties period books portray him as a "learned arbitrator of 'scientific' knowledge". The (early 5th century) Yiyuan 異苑 "Garden of Marvels", by Liu Jingshu 劉敬叔, provides two examples. First, Zhang recognized dragon meat that was served by the author Lu Ji (261-303), who "once invited Zhang Hua to dinner and served minced fish. At the time the dining chamber was full of guests. When Hua lifted off the lid of the dish, he said, 'This is dragon's flesh!' None of the assembled guests believed him, so Hua said, 'Test it by steeping it in vinegar; something strange will happen.' When this was done a rainbow appeared above it." In a second anecdote, Zhang Hua demonstrated the cosmological principle of ganying "sympathetic resonance".

During the Jin, there was a man who owned a large copper basin. Every morning and evening it would ring out just as if someone was striking it. When Zhang Hua was asked about this, he replied "This basin has a sympathetic affinity with the bell in the Luoyang bell-tower. The bell is struck every dawn and every dusk, and thus this basin resounds in sympathy. You could file away [a part of the basin] and thus make it lighter; the sound would reverberate inaccurately and the basin would cease ringing out of its own accord." The man did as Hua had advised, and the basin never rang out again.

The Ganying leicongzhi 感應類從志 "Record of the Mutual Resonances of Things According to Their Categories" is attributed to Zhang Hua.

== Title ==
The Bowuzhi title combines bó 博 or 愽 "broad; abundant; plentiful; learned", wù 物 "thing; matter", and zhì 志 or 誌 "(historical) records; annals; mark; sign; record; register". This title follows Yang Fu's (early 3rd century) Yiwuzhi 異物志 "Records of Foreign Matters". The word bowu 博物 originally meant "broadly knowledgeable; erudite" in the (c. 4th century BCE) Zuozhuan and later came to mean "studies of plants and animals; natural science" in the (80 CE) Lunheng. In general, bowu "refers to realms transgressing the boundaries of the defined canon of knowledge, covering a variety of matters from the strange and supernatural to quaint things of interest". Books on Chinese folk customs and their geographical distribution were termed Fengtu ji (beginning with Zhou Chu's 3rd-century Fengtuji 風土記 "Records of Local Customs"), and descriptions of unfamiliar regions Yiwu zhi. In Modern Standard Chinese usage, bówùxué 博物學 "natural history" and bówùguǎn 博物館 "museum" are common terms.

There is no regular English translation of Bówùzhì, and examples include:

- Record of the Investigation of Things
- A Treatise on Manifold Topics
- Treatise on Curiosities
- Vast Records about Different Topics
- Natural Science
- Miscellaneous Records
- Record of Things at Large
- Records of Myriad [Notable] Things

The Record of the Investigation of Things translation from Joseph Needham's influential Science and Civilisation in China series has been copied by many authors, despite confusion with the famous Neo-Confucian concept of géwù 格物 "the Investigation of Things".

Zhang Hua has been accused of plagiarizing the Bowuzhi from the similarly-titled (c. 190) Bowuji 博物記 "Notes on Diverse Matters" with jì 記 "remember; write down; records; notes" (instead of zhi 志 "records"), attributed to Tang Meng 唐蒙. Tang Meng was a general and explorer who Emperor Wu of Han sent to Nanyue in 135 BCE. However, neither the Book of Han nor later histories record any works written by Tang Meng, and one Bowuji citation mentions the Cao Wei dynasty (220-265) by name. Based upon analysis of the 50 Bowuji quotes in the (5th century) Book of the Later Han commentary, Greatrex concludes it was a different text with a parallel name.

== Editions ==
There are two different editions of the Bowuzhi, respectively dating from Song dynasty (960-1279) and Ming dynasty (1368-1644) copies. Both divide the text into 10 chapters (卷) and comprise nearly the same material, but they differ in organizing the sequence of the 329 items and the presence of 38 topic headings in the Ming copy. Both editions include the two early Bowuzhi commentaries; 20 comments by Zhou Riyong 周日用 (fl. 12th century) and 7 by an unknown author surnamed Lu, Lushi 盧氏.

The "Song edition" was compiled and published in 1804 by Huang Pilie 黃丕烈 (1763-1825), a renowned Qing dynasty (1644-1912) book collector and editor. Huang said the edition was based on a copy owned in his family, and considered it to date from the Northern Song dynasty (960–1127). The Song edition was included in collections such as the (1936) Sibu beiyao 四部備要. The "Ming edition" was published in 1503 by He Zhitong 賀志同, and is presently housed in the National Library of China in Beijing. Wang Shihan 汪士漢 published a reprint in 1668. The Ming edition, which is the earliest extant, was included in the (1782) Siku Quanshu and various other book collections.

The total content matter of these two versions is almost identical; the Song edition repeats three items in chapter 10 which have appeared earlier in the text, while the Ming edition has omitted them. Both editions are divided into 10 chapters, while the Ming edition is further sub-divided under 38 or 39 (dividing the final Zashuo 雜說 "Miscellaneous sayings" into two) headings that designate the content in each respective subsection. Campany says the absence of topic headings and non-rational sequencing of items have led some to speculate that the "Ming edition" represents a tidying-up of an earlier "Song edition" descended from Zhang Hua's original, but Huang Pilie's text was neither necessarily of Song date nor any closer to Zhang's text. It is well established that some Ming scholars responded to a misguided scholastic urge to rearrange old texts that they considered disorganized, and the "stylistic device" of adding sub-headings to works of random jottings first became widespread during the Ming.

Three authors wrote supplements to the Bowuzhi. During the Southern Song dynasty, Li Shi 李石 compiled the (mid-12th century) Xu bowuzhi 續博物志 "Continuation to the Bowuzhi" in 10 chapters, which quotes early sources without any textual criticism. During the Ming dynasty, Dong Sizhang 董斯張 compiled the extensive (1607) Guang Bowuzhi 廣博物志 "Enlargement of the Bowuzhi" in 50 chapters. And during the Qing dynasty, You Qian 游潛 compiled the Bowuzhi bu 博物志補 "Supplement to the Bowuzhi" in 2 chapters, which added miscellaneous information.

Several modern annotated editions of the Bowuzhi have been published in recent years. Fan Ning 范寧 wrote an acclaimed text-critical edition of the Bowuzhi, which discusses textual history and includes 212 additional passages quoted in later texts.

Roger Greatrex, professor of Chinese studies at Lund University, wrote the first English translation of the Bowuzhi.

== History ==
Scholars have debated over the history of the Bowuzhi for centuries. Although Zhang Hua's authorship has never been questioned, some doubt the authenticity of the text, based upon the numerous quotations from the Bowuzhi that are not found in received editions. In the traditional assessment, Zhang's original Bowuzhi had been lost, and the current text is a rewriting or restoration based on extracts of the original and is of unknown date. Modern research, both Chinese and Western, has found that copies of the original Bowuzhi existed until around the 12th century, and was the basis for both the "Song" and "Ming editions." Greatrex says that both imperial and private libraries from the Six Dynasties to the present recorded copies of the Bowuzhi, and at no point in time does the text totally disappear from view.

The first historically reliable mention of the Bowuzhi occurs in the (554) Book of Wei biography of the classical scholar Chang Jing 常景 (c. 478-550), "Jing composed several hundred chapters which are currently available. He revised and edited the Bowu zhi by Zhang Hua and also composed the Biographies of Confucian Scholars (Rulin zhuan) and the Biographies of Various Ladies (Lienu zhuan), each of which was in several dozen chapters." In the opinion of Greatrex, while later interpolations into the present Bowuzhi text are rare, a number of short passages, muddled into the main text, stem from Chang Jing's (mid-6th century) commentary.

A possibly earlier reference, Wang Jia's Shiyiji — which was written in the 4th century, lost, and recompiled by Xiao Qi in the 6th century — says Emperor Wu of Jin (r. 266-290) ordered Zhang Hua to condense the Bowuzhi from 400 to 10 chapters.

Zhang Hua liked to peruse mysterious and strange charts and Apocryphal works, and from them he selected odd long-lost tales from the four corners of the world, from the very beginning of the written character. When he had examined these mysterious and strange (works) and added to them the hearsay rumoured abroad and snatches of conversation overheard in the palace ante-rooms, he composed the Bowu zhi in four hundred chapters, and presented to emperor Wu. The emperor summoned him and said: "Your talent embraces the ten thousand generations and the width of your knowledge is without equal. In the past you surpass the Emperor Fuxi and more recently, you are second only to Confucius. However, in your recording of affairs and in your selection of words, there is much that is superficial and exaggerated which should be deleted from this work. One should not rely upon verbosity when composing a work! When in the past, Confucius edited the Shijing and the Shujing, he never came to the affairs of the spirits and the unknown and thus never spoke of 'extraordinary things, feats of strength, disorder and spiritual beings'. Your Bowu zhi will startle people with that which they have never heard of previously, and will make them wonder over that which they have never previously seen. This book will frighten and confuse later generations, it will bewilder the eye and disturb the ear. You should delete and alter that which is superficial and doubtful and divide the text into 10 chapters."

The context continues with Emperor Wu presenting Zhang Hua with three rare tribute gifts, an iron inkstone from Khotan, a qilin-handle ink brush from Liaoxi, and a 1000 sheets of seaweed-filament paper from Nanyue; and "The emperor always kept the ten-chapter version of the Bowu zhi in his book-box and looked in it on his days of leisure." Cèlǐzhǐ 側理紙 "intricate filament paper" had complex and crooked lines.

The editors of the (1782) Siku Quanshu listed examples of passages attributed to the Bowuzhi found in other works, but not contained in the current edition, and believed that the current textual edition did not date from the Tang or Song, but was most likely a Ming recension. They conclude, "It is a scissors-and-paste scrap-book of a work, and is not Hua's original work", and suggest "Probably the original work is lost, and meddlers having scoured all the works that quote the Bowu zhi, have compiled the present text, supplementing it with passages drawn from other Xiaoshuo [fiction]."

The missionary sinologist Alexander Wylie summarized the standard Qing dynasty scholarly opinion of the Bowuzhi.

The Po wuh che was originally drawn up by Chang Hwa, in the latter part of the third century. His production, however, appears to have been lost during the Sung, and the present work in ten books with that title, was probably compiled at a later period from the extracts contained in other publications; but there are still many quotations from it in the ancient literature which do not appear in the present edition. It is in great part occupied with records of the marvellous.

Fan Ning traced the "Ming edition" version back to Chang Jing's (6th century) 10-chapter abridgment (mentioned above), which seems to have survived alongside Zhang Hua's longer 10-chapter autograph text until at least until the late twelfth century. The fate of the unabridged original text remains a mystery.

There is a possibility that the original Bowuzhi copy that was the basis for the Song edition dated from the early 7th century. Greatrex suggests that some graphic alterations in the text reflect the strict naming taboo against writing the current emperor's given name. The personal name of Emperor Gaozu of Tang (r. 618-626) was Yuan 淵, and in one context the character yuan 淵 has been altered to quan 泉. The personal name of Emperor Taizong of Tang (r. 627-650) was Shimin 世民, and in two contexts ye 葉 has been altered to the character qi 萋, and in another the character xie 泄 has been altered to xie 洩.

== Example entries ==
In order to illustrate the diverse content of the Bowuzhi, some notable mythic and scientific passages are given below. Some items blur the lines between fact and fiction. For instance, the legend about "Wild Women" in Vietnam has been interpreted as an early observation of orangutans that was exaggerated into a tall tale.

=== Ethnographic legends ===
The Bowuzhi contains the earliest reference to the mythical yěnǚ 野女 "Wild Women" of Rinan (present-day central Vietnam), naked, white-skinned women in an exclusively female society. The item says (9), "In Annam there are 'wild women', which travel about in groups in search of men for husbands. Their appearance is dazzlingly white, and they go naked, without any clothing at all." Later texts quoted and misquoted Zhang Hua's "Wild Women" item, and elaborated the narrative.

The Qidong yeyu (齊東野語, "Words of a Retired Scholar from the East of Qi"), written by Zhou Mi (1232–1298), has a yěpó 野婆 "Wild Woman" entry, with pó "woman; old woman; grandmother".

Yepo (meaning "wild woman") is found in Nandanzhou. It has yellow hair shaped into coils. It is naked and wears no shoes. It looks like a very old woman. All of them are female and there are no male ones. They climb up and down the mountain as fast as golden monkeys. Under their waists are pieces of leather covering their bodies. When they encounter a man, they will carry him away and force him to mate. It is reported once that such a creature was killed by a strong man. It protected its waist even when it was being killed. After dissecting the animal, a piece of seal chip was found that was similar to a piece of gray jade with inscriptions on it.

Li Shizhen's (1578) Bencao gangmu pharmacopeia quotes the "Wild Women" under the xingxing 狌狌 "orangutan" entry (51), and cites the Eryayi 爾雅翼 "Wings to the Erya" by Luo Yuan 羅願 (1136–1184) that, "'It seems such a creature is actually a Yenü (meaning "wild girl") or Yepo (meaning "wild woman")'", and Li asks, "Are they the same?" The subentry for the yenü 野女 or yěpó 野婆 quotes, "The book Bowu Zhi by Tang Meng [sic]: In the Rinan area there is a kind of creature called the Yenü (meaning "wild girl") that travels in group. No male ones are to be found. They are white and crystal-like, wearing no clothes." It also quotes Zhou Mi's Qidong yeyu (above), and Li comments: "According to what Ruan Qian and Luo Yuan said above, it seems that this Yenü is actually an orangutan. As to the seal chip found in the animal, it is similar to the case that the testes of a male mouse are said to have seal characters [fuzhuan 符篆 "symbolic seal script"] on them, and the case that under the wing of a bird a seal of mirror has been found. Such things are still unclear to us."

Two Song dynasty imperial reference works quote the Zhang Hua's "Wild Women" in their Báimín guó 白民國 "Country of White Folk" entries that refer to two Shanhaijing myths about white-skinned people. The (983) Taiping Yulan encyclopedia quotes the Bowuzhi and two Shanhaijing chapters. In the west, "The Country of White Folk lies to the north of the land of Dragonfish. The people of White Folk Country have a white body and they wear their hair loose." In the east, "There is the Country of White Folk. The great god Foremost [俊] gave birth to the great god Vast [鴻]. The great god Vast gave birth to the White Folk.", giving a divine genealogical origin myth. The (978) Taiping Guangji collection misquotes the Bowuzhi for the above Shanhaijing myth, "In that place there are the ride-yellow creatures which look like a fox and have horns on their backs. People who ride them will live to be 2,000 years old."

The Bowuzhi mentions various poisons and antidotes, including an arrowhead poison used by the Lizi 俚子 people in Jiaozhou (present day northern Vietnam), later confused with the Li people of Hainan.

In Jiaozhou, there are barbarians called the Lizi. Their bows are several chi long, and their arrows are more than a chi long. They use scorched bronze [jiāotóng 焦銅] as arrowheads, and smear them with poisonous medicaments on the tip. If such an arrow hits a man, he will die within a short while. Once the tip has lodged in his body, the affected area swells, and the wound suppurates. After a short while the flesh blisters and 'boils away', revealing the bone. In accord with the barbarian custom, they have sworn not to divulge the method for preparing this medicament to other people. To cure it, drink menstrual blood mixed with excremental fluid. Sometimes there are those who recover. The Lizi only use this poison when shooting pigs and dogs, but not other creatures, since pigs and dogs eat excrement. In the making of scorched bronze, one burns bronze vessels. Those who are adepts at it differentiate the potentiality of the scorched bronze by its sound. They use something to tap the vessel, and listen carefully to the sound. Once they have obtained the scorched bronze, then they chisel it out and use it to make arrowheads.

Cooper and Sivin quote this Bowuzhi item and note that "excremental fluid" is the liquid that gradually forms in an open privy.

The Bowuzhi records a legendary wind-propelled flying machine, as opposed to numerous early myths of flying vehicles drawn by dragons or birds. The story mentions Tang (r. c. 1675–1646 BC), the first king of the Shang dynasty, meeting the Jigong 奇肱 (lit. "odd/uneven upper-arms") people from far west of the Jade Gate.

The Jigong people were good at making mechanical devices [機巧] for killing the hundred sorts of birds. They could make a flying carriage [飛車] which travelling with the wind, travelled great distances. In the reign of emperor Tang, a westerly wind blew such a carriage as far as Yuzhou. Tang had the carriage taken to pieces, for he did not wish to show it to his people. Ten years later there came an easterly wind [of sufficient strength], and then the carriage was reassembled and the visitors were sent back to their own country. Their country lies forty thousand li beyond the Jade Gate pass. (8)

An earlier version of this story occurs in the Diwang shiji 帝王世紀 "Stories of Ancient Monarchs" by Huangfu Mi (215-282), who took Jigong to be a person rather than a people. The Shanhaijing also mentions the Jigong "Country of Singlearm", whose people "have one arm and three eyes" and "ride on piebald horses", without any reference to flying vehicles.

=== Protoscientific observations ===
Bowuzhi Chapter 6 has two consecutive items describing highly potent liquors, possibly the first references to "freeze distillation" or technically fractional freezing. This technique for concentrating alcohol involves repeatedly freezing wine or beer and removing the ice (for instance, applejack or ice beer, but not ice wine made from frozen grapes). The earliest Chinese record is traditionally believed to be the (late 7th century) Liang Sigong ji 梁四公記 "Tales of the Four Lords of Liang", which says emissaries from Gaochang presented dòngjiǔ 凍酒 "frozen-out wine" to Emperor Wu of Liang around 520.

The first item refers to qiānrìjiǔ 千日酒 "thousand day wine".

Long ago Xuanshi [玄石] bought wine in a wine-house in Zhongshan, and the wineshop owner gave him thousand-day wine but forgot to tell him its alcoholic potency. Xuanshi went home and became drunk, but his housefolk did not realise this and thought that he was dead, and tearfully buried him. When the wine-shop owner had calculated that the thousand days were up, he recalled that Xuanshi had previously bought some of his wine, and that his stupour should have worn off by now. He went to visit Xuanshi, but was told that he had died three years previously and was already buried. Thereafter they opened the coffin and [indeed] he had just sobered up. A common saying arose, "Xuanshi had a drink, and stayed drunk a thousand days". (6)

The second refers to a non-Chinese pútáojiǔ 葡萄酒 (6), "In the western regions there is a grape wine which can be stored for many years without going bad. There is a common saying which goes, "One can drink it after ten years, and stay drunk a full month before its effect wears off!" This clearly describes liquor and not ordinary wine, and was the earliest known Chinese reference to "frozen-out wine". "'Frozen-out wine' then, in all its primitive simplicity, was, we would suggest, an important step on the road from beer or wine as such to distilled 'strong liquor'."

Furthermore, Wang Jia's (c. 370) Shiyi ji says Zhang Hua made lethal jiǔyùn chūnjiǔ 九醞春酒 "nine fermented spring wine" or xiāochángjiǔ 酒腸消 "gut-rotting wine" using a special ferment and grain he obtained from the Five Barbarians. This wine "causes chattering of the teeth and apparent drunkenness without shouting or laughter, injuring the liver and intestines".

When Zhang Hua had attained high office, one of his companions from his childhood came to pay a visit upon him. Hua and his childhood friend drank Nine-fold fermented wine, and caroused with a will. In the evening they both became quite drunk and fell asleep. Hua was accustomed to drinking this wine, and after becoming inebriated, he had his attendants roll him from side to side while he slept until he woke up. In this way one could consume this wine without coming to harm. However on this occasion, he forgot [to make arrangements for his friend]. Hua's attendants, as usual, rolled him from side to side, but there was no-one who did this to his friend. The following morning, when his friend did not arise, Hua groaned and said, "He must be dead!" and sent someone to see. The wine had indeed oozed out from the man's intestines and had trickled down onto the floor beneath the bed.

Zhang Hua describes spontaneous combustion of oil (3), "If one stores a full ten thousand shi of oil, it will ignite by itself. <Apparent note: The disaster in the Military storehouse during the Taishi period (265-274) was the result of oil storage.>" Taishi 泰始 was the first era name during the reign of Emperor Wu of Jin (265-290). However, the Book of Jin says this military storehouse fire occurred in 295 and the Yiyuan 異苑 "Garden of Marvels" says 293, during the reign of Emperor Hui of Jin. Needham doubts the Bowuzhi account, citing a legal case in the (13th century) Tangyin bishi 堂陰比事 about responsibility for a (c. 1015) fire that started from a pile of oiled curtains in the imperial palace of Emperor Renzong of Song. It says, "[Z]hang Hua thought that the fire which occurred formerly during the (Western) [J]in dynasty in the arsenal originated from the oil which was stored there, but in fact it must have been from the same cause as mentioned here (the spontaneous ignition of oiled cloth)."

Another Bowuzhi chapter describes hemp oil's relatively low smoke point and boiling point phases (2) "If one heats hemp oil, and the steam has ceased and there is no smoke, then it does not boil anymore and becomes cold again. One can put one's hand into it and stir it. However, if it comes into contact with water, flames arise and it explodes, and cannot be extinguished at all." In Joseph Needham's opinion, "These observations are not bad. In the first phase all the water has been driven off as steam and the boiling-point of the oil not yet reached. If sufficiently wetted the finger would not come into contact with the oil, protection being given by a layer of steam. Then when the oil is near its boiling-point, added water will cause violent disturbance and lead to the ignition of drops thrown out."

One Bowuzhi item describes making a burning lens from ice (2), "If one pares a piece of ice into a circle, and holds it up in the direction of the sun, and produces the sun's image on artemisia behind it, the artemisia will catch fire. <Apparent note: As to methods of obtaining fire by the use of pearls, there is much spoken about them, but I have not tried them out.>" Another translation, "A piece of ice is cut into the shape of a round ball", takes yuán 圓 "round; circle" to mean yuánqiú 圓球 "ball; sphere; globe". The huǒzhū 火珠 "fire-pearl" burning lens is mentioned in the Bencao gangmu along with the yángsuì 陽燧 "sun-mirror". Needham and Wang note that although ice can be used in this way (as demonstrated by Robert Hooke), it seems more likely that Zhang Hua was describing a lens of rock-crystal or glass. The word crystal derives from Ancient Greek krýstallos κρύσταλλος "clear ice; (rock-)crystal", and "there was a persistent theory in China, probably of Buddhist origin, that ice turned into rock-crystal after thousands of years."

== See also ==
- Annotations to Records of the Three Kingdoms
- Jizhong discovery
- Zhang Hua
