= Pan Shu =

Empress of Eastern Wu (died 252)

Pan Shu 潘淑
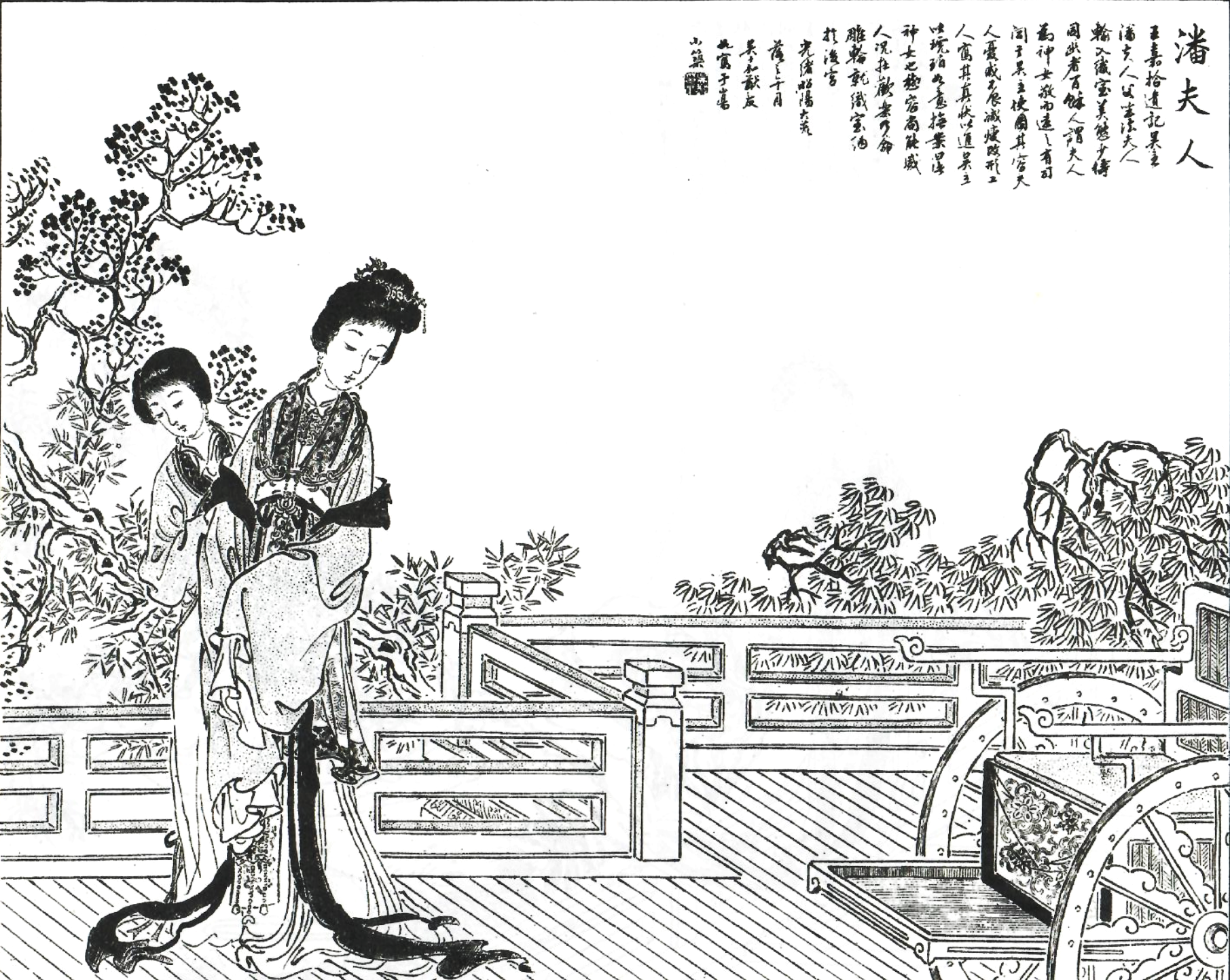
- Empress Pan, drawn by Wu Youru

Empress consort of Eastern Wu
- Tenure: June or July 251 – February or March 252
- Successor: Empress Quan
- Born: Unknown; Ningbo, Zhejiang
- Died: February or March 252; Nanjing, Jiangsu
- Burial: Purple Mountain, Nanjing, Jiangsu
- Spouse: Sun Quan
- Issue: Sun Liang

Empress Pan (died February or March 252), personal name Pan Shu, was an empress of the state of Eastern Wu during the Three Kingdoms period of China. She was the only empress of Wu's founding emperor, Sun Quan, even though he had a succession of wives before her. She was a rare example of becoming an empress from a slave in the Chinese history. She was the mother of Sun Liang, Sun Quan's successor and the second emperor of Wu.

== Early life ==
Lady Pan was from Gouzhang County (句章縣; within present-day Ningbo) in Kuaiji Commandery. Her personal name was not recorded in her biography in the Records of the Three Kingdoms (Sanguozhi), the authoritative source of the history of the Three Kingdoms period. However, the Jiankang Shilu mentioned that her personal name was "Shu", hence she was also known as "Pan Shu". Her father, who served as a low-ranking official, was executed for committing an offence whose details are not recorded. Lady Pan was forced to become a slave and assigned to the royal textile factory.

== Encountering Sun Quan ==
Lady Pan was a legendary beauty, especially known for her melancholic appearance. Once, Sun Quan encountered her and felt that she was extraordinary so he took her as his concubine. The historical treatise Shi Yi Ji provided a more detailed description of their encounter. It mentioned that Lady Pan was known as the most beautiful woman in Jiangdong. When she was still working in the textile factory, people around her respected and kept a distance from her, calling her a goddess. After Sun Quan heard about this story, he ordered the painter to draw Lady Pan's portrait. Although Lady Pan looked glum in the portrait, Sun Quan was shocked because of her beauty and exclaimed:"She is a goddess, indeed. Her sadness is so attractive, let alone her smile." Sun Quan arranged a magnificent carriage to take her into the palace and doted on her from then on. Lady Pan was such a charming woman who was good at obtaining the emperor' favor. Thus she expressed her jealousy freely and never ceased slandering and harming Sun Quan's other wives until her death.

== As imperial consort and empress ==
When Lady Pan was becoming increasingly favoured by Sun Quan, Sun He, the third son of Suan Quan, just became the heir in 242, Sun Quan decided to show respect to the heir's mother Lady Wang through dismissing other favored ladies. Lady Pan, on the other hand, was allowed to stay with Sun Quan even when he was traveling. There are two anecdotes about Pan at this time. One of the stories said that the emperor and Pan often visited a pavilion called Zhaoxuan together. When Lady Pan felt very happy, she drank a lot of wine and poured the remaining wine under the high platform. At this moment, a ruby ring fell out of the wine glass. The wife hung the ruby ring on a pomegranate branch, and Sun Quan built a palace for her called Liuhuantai (榴環臺) for her, which means "the palace of pomegranate and ring". Another story reflects Lady Pan's intelligence. Lady Pan once went fishing with the Sun Quan, and Sun Quan felt very happy to catch a big fish. Pan, however, was worried and said, "Today is so happy, will there be a day of worry in the future?" People believed that Lady Pan's words foreshadowed the political chaos at the end of Sun Quan's reign.

Lady Pan was pregnant. She dreamt of receiving a dragon head and gave birth to Sun Liang in 243. As the favourites of Sun Quan, Pan Shu and Sun Liang are expected to become empress and crown prince respectively. Later in 250, in the aftermath of a succession struggle between Sun Quan's sons Sun He and Sun Ba, Sun Liang was designated as the crown prince by his father.

In 251, Sun Quan instated Lady Pan as the empress. Before that, none of the concubines, including the crown prince's mother, were officially instated as empress since Suan Quan once declared that he would not appoint a concubine as the empress. An amnesty was implemented and new era date was used in order to celebrate Pan becoming the empress. It could be seen that among Sun Quan's many favored concubines, Pan Shu, as a special presence, had been valued.

== Death and burial ==
When Sun Quan became seriously ill in 252, Empress Pan asked Sun Hong (孫弘), the Prefect of the Palace Writers (中書令), about how Empress Lü governed a country after the death of her husband (Emperor Gao of the Han dynasty). However, she herself also fell sick due to the stress of continuously attending to Sun Quan. She was ultimately murdered when she was in deep sleep. Wu officials claimed that her servants strangled her while she was asleep and claimed her death was of natural causes; why she was murdered remains a controversy as the Sanguozhi did not mention the reason of murder. The Jiankang Shilu states that it was because the servants was unwilling to take care of both the seriously ill emperor and the empress, so they murdered the empress to alleviate the burden. Additionally, the Zizhi Tongjian states that Empress Pan abused the servants, so the empress was murdered. However, a number of historians, including Hu Sanxing, a commentator on Sima Guang's Zizhi Tongjian, pointed out that this claim is unfounded and it is a misinterpretation of the original text. He also believed that top Wu officials were complicit, as they feared that she would seize power as empress dowager after Sun Quan's death. Investigations into her death resulted in the execution of 6-7 people. After Empress Pan's death, subjects felt sad and arranged a prayer ceremony for her. Sun Quan died soon after in the same year. Empress Pan was buried together with Sun Quan at the Jiang Mausoleum (蔣陵; at the Purple Mountain, Nanjing, Jiangsu).

== Appearance and portraits ==
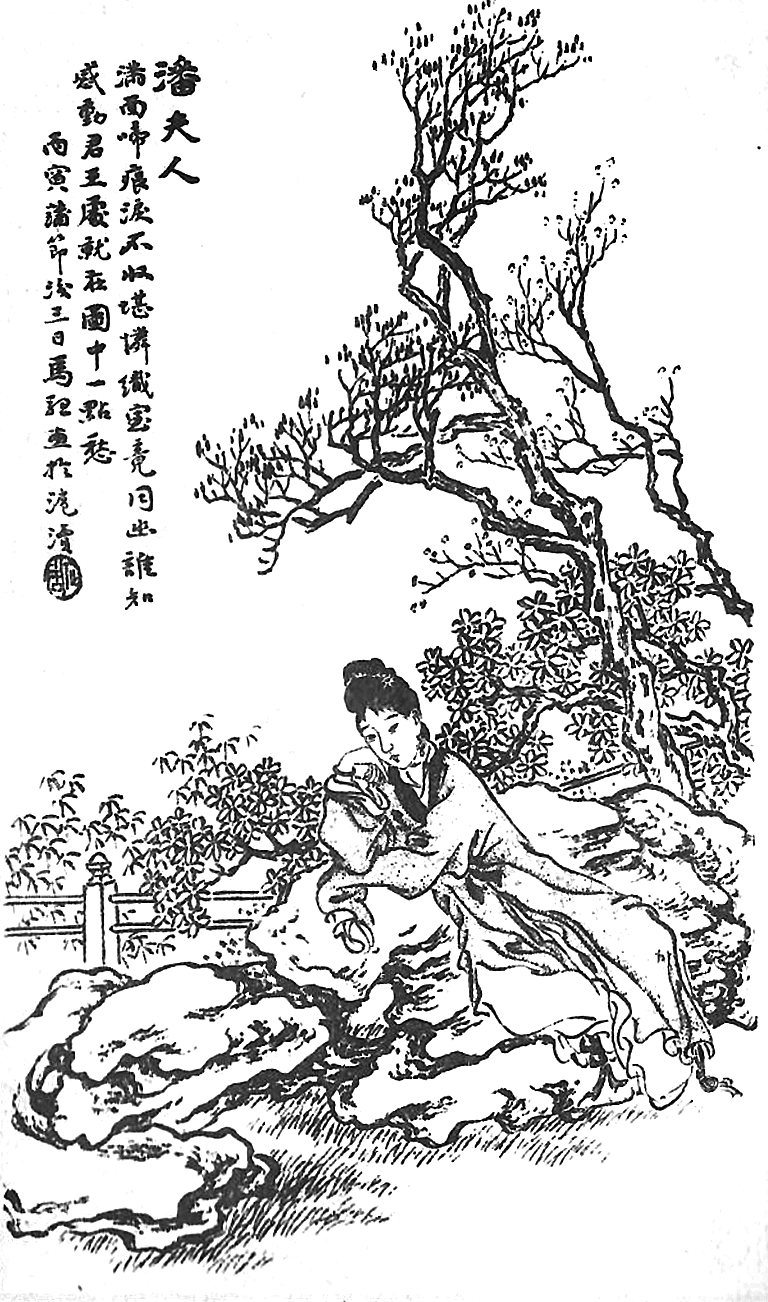
Lady Pan, drawn by Mai Dai

Compared to Sun Quan's eldest daughter Sun Luban, who was portrayed as a purely negative figure in historical narratives, Pan Shu is regarded as a more complex and multifaceted character. According to Records of the Three Kingdoms, Pan Shu won Sun Quan's deep favor due to her exceptional beauty, but her jealous nature and penchant for slander caused constant strife in the imperial harem. Jiankang Shilu, however, describes her as dignified and respectful, while Shi Yi Ji extols her beauty, likening her appearance to that of a celestial maiden. The "Weeping Fish" anecdote recorded about Pan Shu in Shiyi Ji suggests she may have possessed remarkable foresight. Given the disputed authenticity of these contradictory historical accounts, it is difficult to render a simple judgment on Pan Shu's fundamental nature as purely good or evil. By presenting the multidimensional records of Pan Shu in historical sources, Pan Shu is considered to gain favor through beauty. She also maintained self-awareness and clarity of mind; despite being habitually jealous and slanderous, she demonstrated tender care for her husband Sun Quan.

According to Wang Jia, Pan and Sun Quan's other concubine, Lady Zhao, are equally famous. They are compared to the Goddess of the Luo River and Yaoji due to their beauty and talent. On the other hand, Zhu Ju compare her to Li Ji, believing that she may have played some important role in deposing the former crown prince.

Pan often appears in the theme of one hundred beauties in ancient China. Renowned Qing dynasty painters such as Wang Hui and Wu Youru had painted Pan’s impressionistic paintings. The scene of Pan Shu being invited to the palace, which was mentioned in the "Shiyiji", was very popular. Yuan Mei, a Chinese poet of the Qing Dynasty, wrote,

The poor girl's face was full of tears, imprisoned in the textile factory. The last place that could move the emperor was the sad expression on the painting.
滿面啼痕淚不收，堪憐織室竟同幽，誰知感動君王處，就在圖中一點愁。

Pan was briefly introduced in the 14th-century historical novel Romance of the Three Kingdoms.

== Faith and spirituality ==
Like her husband, Empress Pan also showed enthusiasm for Buddhism. She made contributions to the dissemination of Buddhism and established the first Buddhist temple called Huibaosi (惠寶寺) in Wuchang, the provisional capital of Eastern Wu.

== Family ==
In addition to her father who served as a low-level official, Empress Pan also had an elder sister, who was sent to the textile factory together. In 250, Lady Pan requested Sun Quan to emancipate her elder sister from slavery and arrange a marriage for her sister and he agreed. Lady Pan's sister later married Tan Shao (譚紹). When Sun Liang became the new emperor, he commissioned his uncle as a Cavalry Commandant (騎都尉). After Sun Liang was demoted to a prince under Sun Chen's persecution, Tan Shao lost his official position and was sent back to his home town of Luling with his family.

== See also ==
- Eastern Wu family trees#Sun Quan
- Lists of people of the Three Kingdoms

Chinese royalty
New dynasty	Empress of Eastern Wu; 251–252	Succeeded by Empress Quan
Preceded by Empress Cao Jie of Eastern Han dynasty	Empress of China (Southeastern); 251–252	Succeeded by Empress Quan
