= Ganying =

Chinese cultural concept of resonance

Chinese name
- Traditional Chinese: 感應
- Simplified Chinese: 感应
- Literal meaning: stimulus [and] response
Transcriptions
Standard Mandarin
- Hanyu Pinyin: gǎnyìng
- Wade–Giles: kan-ying
Yue: Cantonese
- Jyutping: gam2 jing3
Southern Min
- Hokkien POJ: kám-èng
Middle Chinese
- Middle Chinese: komX ywengX
Old Chinese
- Baxter–Sagart (2014): *kˤ[əə]mʔ [ɢ]ʷeŋʔ

Vietnamese name
- Vietnamese: cảm ứng
- Hán-Nôm: 感應

Korean name
- Hangul: 감응
- Hanja: 感應
Transcriptions
- Revised Romanization: gameung
- McCune–Reischauer: kamŭng

Japanese name
- Hiragana: かんのう
- Kyūjitai: 感應
- Shinjitai: 感応
Transcriptions
- Revised Hepburn: kannō

Gǎnyìng or yìng is a Chinese cultural keyword meaning a "correlative resonance" pulsating throughout the purported force field of qi that infuses the cosmos. When the idea of ganying first appeared in Chinese classics from the late Warring States period (475-221 BCE), it referred to a cosmological principle of "stimulus and response" between things of the same kind, analogous with vibratory sympathetic resonance. Early schools of Chinese philosophy adapted ganying into different folk theories of causality, such as universal resonance influencing all interrelated things in Daoism, and ethical resonance between Heaven and humans in Confucianism.

Ganying resonance was later used to mean miraculous "moral retribution" in Chinese folk religion, and the resonance between the power of the Buddha and the individual practitioner in Chinese Buddhism, especially in Pure Land Buddhism. In Japanese Buddhism, the term kannō 感應 was used for the same idea.

In the modern period, Chinese ganying "stimulus and response" was used to translate some Western scientific loanwords (such as diàncí gǎnyìng 電磁感應 "electromagnetic induction").

== Terminology ==
The Chinese collocation gǎnyìng combines gǎn 感 "feel, sense; move, touch; (traditional Chinese medicine) be affected (by cold)" and yìng traditional 應 or simplified 应 "respond; consent, comply; adapt to; cope/deal with; apply, applied", which is also pronounced yīng "promise/agree (to do something); answer; respond; (auxiliary) should; ought to".

Several early texts (below) use an interchangeable synonym of ying < Old Chinese *[q](r)əәŋ 應 "respond; resonate" : dòng < *[Cəә-m-]tˤoŋʔ 動 "move; shake; set in motion". Dong can mean ganying, for instance, gǎndòng 感動 "move; touch (somebody)" and dòngrén 動人 "arouse interest/feelings". Sharf says interpreting the Chinese philosophical term gan "stimulus; affect; etc." is rendered problematic by the modern distinction between ontology and epistemology. The ontological range of meanings, insofar as to gan someone is to effect the mind of another person, as evident in the (c. 121 CE) Shuowen jiezi dictionary definition of gan as 動人心也 "to move a person's mind", suggesting English translation equivalents such as "incite," "agitate," "rouse," and "stimulate". The epistemological range of gan meanings, insofar as it implies an inner experience or cognition that may or may not correlate with an event in the external world, is translatable as to "feel," "experience," "sense," or "become aware of."

Both the logographs gǎn 感 and yìng 應 are classified as radical-phonetic characters written with the "heart-mind radical" 心 (typically used to write words for feelings and thoughts) and phonetic indicators of xián 咸 "all; Hexagram 31" and yīng 鷹 "hawk; eagle" minus the "bird radical" 鳥.

Bilingual Chinese-English dictionaries give a variety of translation equivalents for Modern Standard Chinese ganying.

- moved to response through the feelings and affections; induction
- ① to feel and respond ② (physics) induction
- reaction or response to some outer stimuli
- ① response; reaction; interaction ② [biology] irritability ③ [electricity] induction
- ① response ② [electricity] induction
- ① response; reaction; interaction ② [biology] irritability ③ [electricity] induction
- ① induction; process through which an object or electromagnetic body becomes magnetized when in a magnetic field or in the magnetic flux set up by a magnetmotive force ② response; reaction; feeling or act of response caused by an outside influence
- ① [philosophy] response; reaction; interaction ② [biology] irritability ③ [electricity] induction ④ [religion] the prayers being listened to
- (A) respond (B) [electricity] induction

The most commonly given (and copied) meanings are "respond; response" and "electromagnetic induction".

== History ==
The history of ganying spans over two millennia, going from an ancient cosmological theory to modern scientific terminology.

Ancient texts use string resonance or sympathetic vibration between paired Chinese musical instruments as the most common analogy for (gan)ying "cosmic resonance". The Zhuangzi, Lüshi chunqiu (twice), Huainanzi (twice), and Chuci all mention plucking the classical pentatonic gong 宮 and jue 角 notes on the se 瑟 "a 25-string zither"; but the Chunqiu fanlu mentions the gong and shang 商 notes on either the se or qin 琴 "a 7-string zither". Joseph Needham notes both these instruments are commonly mistranslated as "lutes", but are actually "zithers", describing the qin as "a half-tube zither" and the se (which only survives in the descendent zheng 箏) as "a horizontal psaltery". In modern terms of the solmization stave, gong, shang, and jue correspond to do, re, and mi. Click here to hear the gong "Original Tuning", shang "Sharpened Re Tuning", and jue "Lowered Third-string Tuning" on the Chinese zither.

== Warring States period ==
The earliest records of ganying are in Chinese classics from the late Warring States period (475-221 BCE), when the "Hundred Schools of Thought" developed competing philosophical doctrines, including correlative resonance.

=== Yijing ===
In the (c. 4th-3rd century BCE) Yijing "Classic of Changes", the "Commentary on the Decision" for Hexagram 31 Xian 咸 "Influence (Wooing)" uses ganying 感應 to explain the Old Chinese phonetic connection between *[g]ˤr[əә]m 咸 "all; everywhere" and *kˤ[əә]mʔ 感 "move emotionally".

INFLUENCE [咸] means stimulation [感]. The weak is above, the strong below. The forces of the two stimulate and respond [感應] to each other, so that they unite. Keeping Still and joyousness. The masculine subordinates itself to the feminine. Hence it is said: "Success. Perseverance furthers. To take a maiden to wife brings good fortune." Heaven and earth stimulate each other, and all things take shape and come into being. The holy man stimulates the hearts of men, and the world attains peace and rest. If we contemplate the outgoing stimulating influences, we can know the nature of heaven and earth and all beings.

Le Blanc says the roots for the "key notion" of resonance can be traced back to the older strata of the Yijing, citing an early saying preserved in Hexagram 1 Qian 乾's line interpretation.

Nine in the fifth place means: "Flying dragon in the heavens. It furthers one to see the great man." What does this signify? The Master said: Things that accord in tone vibrate together [同聲相應, repeated in Zhuangzi below]. Things that have affinity in their inmost natures seek one another [同氣相求]. Water flows to what is wet, fire turns to what is dry. Clouds follow the dragon, wind follows the tiger. Thus the sage rises, and all creatures follow him with their eyes. What is born of heaven feels related to what is above. What is born of earth feels related to what is below. Each follows it kind.

=== Xiaojing ===
The (c. 400 BCE) Xiaojing "Classic of Filial Piety" has a section named Ganying 感應, translated as "The Influence of Filial Piety and the Response to It" (Legge) or "Feeling and Responding by the Spirits" (Feng). It begins with an explanation of how the gods and spirits respond to human activities,

The Master said, "Anciently, the intelligent kings served their fathers with filial piety, and therefore they served Heaven with intelligence. They served their mothers with filial piety, and therefore they served Earth with discrimination. They pursued the right course with reference to their (own) seniors and juniors, and therefore they secured the regulation of the relations between superiors and inferiors (throughout the kingdom). When Heaven and Earth were served with intelligence and discrimination, the spiritual intelligences displayed (their retributive power)." (16)

=== Xunzi ===
The (3rd century BCE) Confucian classic Xunzi repeats the above Yijing folk-etymology that the xian < *[g]ˤr[əә]m hexagram is the phonetic in the character for gan 感 < *kˤ[əә]mʔ "stimulate' influence".

The hexagram Xian, "All", of the Changes shows the relation of husband to wife. The Way of relations between husband and wife cannot be allowed to be incorrect, for it is the root source for the relations between lord and minister, father and son. The hexagram Xian [咸] means "influence" [感]. It uses the high to descend to the low, the male to descend to the female. It is weak and pliant above and strong and hard below." (27.38)

The Xunzi uses ganying "joint resonance" to explain the harmonious connection between a person's xing 性 "inborn nature" and jing 精 "essence; senses".

These are the common names that apply to man. That which is as it is from the time of birth is called the nature of man [性]. That which is harmonious from birth, which is capable of perceiving through the senses and of responding to stimulus spontaneously [精合感應] and without effort, is also called nature [性]. The likes and dislikes, delights and angers, griefs and joys of the nature are called emotions [情]. When the emotions are aroused and the mind makes a choice from among them, this is called thought [慮]. (22)

=== Zhuangzi ===
The (c. 3rd-2nd centuries BCE) Daoist classic Zhuangzi contains an early version of the zither string resonance analogy, which Sharf describes as undoubtedly "the single most persuasive demonstration of the principle of resonance".

Zhuangzi tells the story to his friend Huizi in order to explain that the five predominant schools of philosophy, Confucianism, Mohism, Yangism, School of Names, and "Pingism" [uncertain]), merely debate like the five notes of the pentatonic scale, while Daoism contains and transcends them like an untuned note that resonates all 25 strings of the se 瑟 zither.

"Well, then," said Master Chuang, "there are the four schools of the Confucians, the Mohists, the Yangists, and the Pingists. Adding yours, master, it makes five. Which of you is actually right? Or may it be someone like Hasty Ninny [Lu Ju 魯遽]? His disciple said to him, 'I have attained your way, master. In winter I can light a cooking fire under a three-legged vessel and in summer I can make ice'. 'That's merely to attract [召] yang with yang and yin with yin'; said Hasty Ninny. 'It's not what I mean by the Way. I will show you my Way.' Thereupon he tuned two zithers. He placed one of them in the hall and the other in an inner chamber. When he plucked the note do [宮] on one, do resonated [動] on the other, and when he plucked the note mi [角] on one, mi resonated [動] on the other. It's because their harmonies were the same. If he had retuned one of the strings so it didn't match any note in the pentatonic scale, and had then plucked it, all twenty-five strings on the other zither would have resonated [動], not because there was any fundamental difference in the sound, but because it was the note that dominated all the rest. May it be that you thinkers are all like this?" (23)

One Zhuangzi context uses gan with ying: "The sage walks with heaven in life and evolves with things in death. In stillness, he shares the same integrity as yin; in movement, he shares the same current as yang. He is not the founder of fortune, nor is he the initiator of misfortune. He responds [應] when affected [感], moves when pressed, and arises only when he has no other choice. He rids himself of knowledge and precedent, conforming to the principle of heaven." (15)

Two others use ying to describe acoustic resonance: "Similar categories follow each other [同類相從] and similar sounds respond to each other [同聲相應]. Indeed, this is the principle of heaven." (31) "To one who does not dwell in himself, the forms of things will manifest themselves. His movement is like water, his stillness is like a mirror. His response is like an echo [其應若響], indistinct as though it were absent, quiet as though it were pure." (33)

=== Lüshi chunqiu ===
Two chapters of Lü Buwei's (c. 240 BCE) wide-ranging Lüshi chunqiu "The Annals of Lu Buwei" repeat the ying 應 "acoustic resonance" zither-string analogy, and explain how phenomena that are of the same lei 類 "kind; category" mutually zhao 召 "resonate; attract" one another.

Things belonging to the same category naturally attract each other [類同相召]; things that share the same ethers [qi 氣] naturally join together; and notes that are comparable naturally resonate [應] to one another. Strike the note gong [宮] on one instrument and other strings tuned to the gong note will vibrate [應]; strike the note jue [角] and other strings tuned to the jue note will vibrate [應]. Water flowing across leveled earth will flow to the damp places; light evenly stacked firewood, and the fire will catch where it is driest. Clouds above a mountain look like shrubs; above water they resemble fish scales; above an arid landscape they look like leaping fire; above a flood they resemble rolling waves. Without exception, everything manifests signs that show men it shares the same category with that which creates it. Thus, "use the dragon to bring rain, and use a form to pursue a shadow. Wherever an army has camped, brambles and briars are sure to grow." The natural occurrence of fortune and misfortune is considered by the masses to be a matter of destiny, but how could they know its true source? (13.2)

Things belonging to the same category naturally attract each other [類同相召]; things that share the same ethers naturally join together; and musical notes that are close naturally resonate with one another [應]. Thus, strike the note gong [宮] on one instrument, and other strings tuned to the note gong will respond [應], or strike the note jue [角], and the other strings tuned to the note jue will vibrate [動]. Use the dragon to bring rain, Use a form to pursue a shadow. The natural occurrence of fortune and misfortune is considered by the masses to be a matter of destiny; but how could they know its true source? Hence, when a state is in disorder, it does not merely remain in disorder but attracts bandits. Were it only to remain disordered, it would not necessarily perish; but since it attracts bandits, there is no means by which it could survive. (2.40)

Xinzhong Yao's encyclopedia of Confucianism defines ganying as "a mutual resonance or mutual sympathy between two or more phenomena", and says that in the Lüshi chunqiu, "the actions of the ruler elicit certain responses from Heaven, which are manifested through omens. In this system of resonances, the depth of the sovereign's moral cultivation is directly proportional to the prosperity of the realm." The ancient Chinese view that anomalies in the heavens, disturbances on earth, earthquakes, avalanches, sightings of unusual animals, and other such "wonders" (怪) were omens of the king's behavior has been termed "phenomenalism" by Western sinologists.

== Han dynasty ==
During the Han dynasty (206 BCE-220 CE), scholars and philosophers adapted the notion of ganying into different fields. For Han cosmologists, ganying was important in both human-cosmos and state-cosmos correspondences. During the Han era, Henderson says both imperial ideology and political criticism rested on a world view shaped by correlative cosmology, which facilitated the wide dissemination of correlative modes of thinking among members of the politically engaged Han elite.

=== Chuci ===
The (c. 3rd century BCE-2nd century CE) Chuci "Songs of Chu" poem "Reckless Remonstrance" gives examples of cosmic resonance in acoustics, biology, and mythology.

Like sounds harmonize together [同音者相]; Creatures mate with their own kind. The flying bird cries out to the flock; The deer calls, searching for his friends. If you strike gong, then gong responds [應]; If you hit jue, then jue vibrates. The tiger roars, and the wind of the valley comes; The dragon soars, and the radiant clouds come flying.

Compare the Yijing (above) saying, "Things that accord in tone vibrate together [同聲相應] ... Clouds follow the dragon, wind follows the tiger."

=== Chunqiu fanlu ===
The Chunqiu Fanlu "Luxuriant Dew of the Spring and Autumn Annals", which is attributed to the Confucianist Dong Zhongshu (179-104 BCE) but compiled later, describes how humans are in a system of relationships with the cosmos, and elevates the notion of resonance to "a full-fledged cosmological theory". This concept was called tian-ren ganying 天人感應 "resonance between Heaven and humans", a phrase that first appears in the (3rd-century CE) Book of Wei history of Emperor Cao Pi (r. 220–226), and was later used as the title of another text attributed to Dong Zhongshu: "Interactions Between Heaven and Mankind". Dong Zhongshu is sometimes credited with having formalized the doctrine of ganying and giving it classical expression.

Chapter 57 Tunglei xiangdong 同類相動 "Mutual Activation of Like Categories" also uses the zither string resonance analogy.

If water is poured on level ground it will avoid the parts which are dry and move towards those that are wet. If (two) identical pieces of firewood are exposed to fire, the latter will avoid the damp and ignite the dry one. All things reject what is different (to themselves) and follow what is akin. Thus it is that if (two) [qi] are similar, they will coalesce; if notes correspond, they resonate [應]. The experimental proof [驗] of this is extraordinarily clear. Try tuning musical instruments. The kung [宮] note or the shang [商] note struck upon one lute will be answered by [應] the kung or the shang notes from other stringed instruments. They sound by themselves. This is nothing miraculous [神], but the Five Notes being in relation; they are what they are according to the numbers [數] (whereby the world is constructed). (Similarly) lovely things summon others among the class of lovely things; repulsive things summon others among the class of repulsive things. This arises from the complementary way in which a thing of the same class responds [類之相應而起也] as for instance if a horse whinnies another horse whinnies in answer [應], and if a cow lows, another cow lows in response [應]. When a great ruler is about to arise auspicious omens first appear; when a ruler is about to be destroyed, there are baleful ones beforehand. Things indeed summon each other, like to like, a dragon bringing rain, a fan driving away heat, the place where an army has been being thick with thorns. Things, whether lovely or repulsive, all have an origin. (If) they are taken to constitute destiny (it is because) no man knows where that origin is. . . It is not only the two [qi] of the Yin and the Yang which advance and retreat [進退] according to their categories. Even the origins of the varied fortunes, good and bad, of men, behave in the same way. There is no happening that does not depend for its beginning upon something prior, to which it responds because (it belongs to the same) category, and so moves [而物以類應之而動者也] ... (As I said) when the note kung is struck forth from a lute, other kung strings (nearby) reverberate of themselves in complementary (resonance) [應]; a case of comparable things being affected according to the classes to which they belong [此物之以類動者也]. They are moved by a sound which has no visible form, and when men can see no form accompanying motion and action, they describe the phenomenon as a 'spontaneous sounding' [自鳴]. And wherever there is a mutual reaction [相動] without anything visible (to account for it) they describe the phenomenon as 'spontaneously so' [自然]. But in truth there is no (such thing as) 'spontaneously so' (in this sense). (I.e. everything in the universe is attuned to certain other things, and changes as they change.) That there are (circumstances which) cause a man to become what in fact he is, we know. So also things do have a real causative (power), invisible though this may be. (1)

Needham explains the importance of pattern and organism in Dong Zhongshu's philosophy: "The symbolic correlations or correspondences all formed part of one colossal pattern. Things behaved in particular ways not necessarily because of prior actions or impulsions of other things, but because their position in the ever-moving cyclical universe was such that they were endowed with intrinsic natures which made that behaviour inevitable for them. ... They were thus parts in existential dependence upon the whole world-organism. And they reacted upon one another not so much by mechanical impulsion or causation as by a kind of mysterious resonance."

=== Huainanzi ===
Liu An's (c. 139 BCE) Huainanzi "Masters of Huainan" is second only to the writings of Dong Zhongshu (see Chunqiu fanlu below) as a source for sympathetic-resonance theory in the Han period. According to Charles Le Blanc, the Huainanzi significantly advanced Chinese cosmological theory, largely due to the use of resonance as a catalyst that blended together ideas from the School of Yin-Yang (such as ganying) with ideas from Daoism (such as wuwei).

While all 21 chapters in the Huainanzi incorporate aspects of cosmological resonance, and chapter 6 Lanming 覽冥, translated as "Peering into the Obscure" or "Surveying Obscurities", is entirely focused on elaborating resonance, the word ganying does not appear once in the text. This Huainanzi uses ying 應 151 times, frequently to denote ganying, and uses gan 感 39 times. The Huainanzi translators John S. Major et al. explain that gan means "an influence; to influence; a stimulus; to stimulate; to evoke a response" and appears twice in chapter 6; and ying means "to respond; a response" and appears 7 times. The words gan and ying only co-occur a few times, but these instances conform exactly to the meaning of resonance that one expects from the concept of ganying; for example, "when stimulated they respond" (gan er ying 感而應, 7.7), and "the stimulus impels a response externally" (gan dong ying yu wai 感動應於外, 10.27). These scholars conclude that when the Huainanzi was written in the mid-2nd century BCE, ganying "resonance" itself had not yet stabilized as a technical term for the phenomenon. Huainanzi chapter 12 Daoying 道應 "Responses of the Way" explains "the ruler must choose the appropriate response (ying) grounded in the Way that is evoked (gan) by the circumstances of the moment".

Huainanzi translators proposed two hypotheses for the origins of ganying philosophy. Charles Le Blanc asserts that the idea originated from musical resonance. John S. Major believes the ideas of Zou Yan (305-240 BCE), founder of the School of Yin-Yang, had a pervading influence on the Huainanzi, and suggests that the doctrine of qi and ganying resonance could perhaps be regarded as a genuine creation of the Zuo Yan school.

The question is, how do these effects come about in the absence of mathematical or mechanical links among the things in a single category? The answer, supplied by Tsou Yen and his school, is that things in a category "vibrate" resonantly together, as two identically-tuned lute strings will vibrate together, and do so through the medium of ch'i, an invisible, aethereal, vibrant substance that permeates the universe.

The Huainanzi has two versions of the earlier Zhuangzi zither string resonance analogy. Both Chapter 6 and Chapter 11 omit the reference to Lu Ju and his disciple who attracted yang to light a fire and yin to make ice, and each account adds a different interpretation. The shorter version refers to the Dao's mysterious ineffability.

Now, one who makes [something] true uses the level; one who makes something straight uses the marking cord. Making true or straight without being in the line or on the level is an art that cannot be shared. When one strikes the [note] gong, gong responds [應]; pluck the jue [string], and [another] jue [string] moves [動]. This is the mutual response of identical tones [同音之相應]. What does not correspond to any of the five tones, but to which all twenty-five strings respond [應], is the Way, which cannot be transmitted. Thus, solitude is the lord of form [形之君]; silence is the ruler of tone [音之主]. (11.14)

The longer version adds a mystical "Great Penetration" associated with a Daoist Zhenren "True/Perfected Person".

Now when a person who tunes a se plays [the note] gong, [another] gong [string] responds [應]; when he plucks a jue [string], [another] jue responds [動]. This is the harmony of notes that are the same. But if [he] tunes one string eccentrically, so that it does not accord with [any] of the five notes and then strikes it, and all twenty-five strings [of the se] respond [應], this is [a case of] the sounds not yet having begun to differentiate but the ruler of [all] notes having already achieved its form [音之君已形]. Thus one who penetrates to Supreme Harmony [太和] is as confused as [a person who] is stupified by drink, who wanders about in a sweet daze without knowing where he has come from or where he is going. Simple and mild, he [descends] the vortex; simple and stupified, he [reaches] his end. He is like one who has not yet begun to emerge from the Ancestor. This is called the Great Penetration [大通]. (6.4)

Like the indiscernible "sounds not yet having begun to differentiate", the True Person "who has not yet begun to emerge" resounds harmoniously with all things. According to Le Blanc, this story's meaning revolves around a distinction between "relative resonance" when notes of the same pitch, such as the strings of two zithers tuned to the gong note, cause each other to vibrate in unison, and "total resonance". when an untuned note causes all 25 strings of a zither to resound simultaneously. The phenomenon of relative resonance, which is based on Yin-Yang theory, is experimentally verifiable; but the hypothesis (or "super-experiment") of total resonance is not verifiable, and used as a simile pointing to a realm beyond Yin-Yang. Total resonance differs in kind, not in degree, from relative resonance. "There is a difference of level. The author starts from a solid but meaningful empirical fact that displays resonance and, from there, analogizes to a metaphorical or metaphysical level where resonance is all-encompassing".

To illustrate how categorically identical things mutually resonate and influence each other, the Huainanzi (3.2 and 6.2) uses "sun and moon mirrors" to exemplify things belonging to the yang and yin categories. The yángsuì 陽燧 "burning-mirror (which concentrates sunlight to ignite tinder)" is yang, round, and sun-like; the fāngzhū 方諸 "moon-mirror (used to collect dew by condensation)" is yin, square, and moon-like.

That things in their [various] categories [類] are mutually responsive [相應] is [something] dark, mysterious, deep, and subtle. Knowledge is not capable of assessing it; argument is not capable of explaining it. Thus, when the east wind arrives, wine turns clear and overflows [its vessels]; when silkworms secrete fragmented silk, the shang string [of a stringed instrument] snaps. Something has stimulated [感] them. When a picture is traced out with the ashes of reeds, the moon's halo has a [corresponding] gap. When the leviathan dies, comets appear. Something has moved them. Thus, when a sage occupies the throne, he embraces the Way and does not speak, and his nurturance reaches to the myriad people. But when ruler and ministers [harbor] distrust in their hearts, back-to-back arcs appear in the sky. The mutual responses [相應] of spirit qi [神氣] are subtle indeed! Thus, mountain clouds are like grassy hummocks; river clouds are like fish scales; dryland clouds are like smoky fire; cataract clouds are like billowing water. All resemble their forms and evoke responses [感] according to their class. The burning mirror takes fire from the sun; the square receptacle takes dew from the moon. Of [all the things] between Heaven and Earth, even a skilled astrologer cannot master all their techniques. [Even] a hand [that can hold] minutely tiny and indistinct things cannot grasp a beam of light. However, from what is within the palm of one's hand, one can trace [correlative] categories [類] to beyond the extreme end point [of the cosmos]. [Thus] that one can set up [these implements] and produce water and fire is [a function of] the mutually [responsive] movement [相動] of yin and yang of the same qi. (6.2)

Another Chapter 6 passage illustrates how resonance is in harmony with the Dao, and admits that even someone with "enlightened understanding" cannot explain the mysterious forces of magnetism, optics, enzymes, and heliotropism.

Now if one were to accept [that] fire can burn wood and use it to melt metal, that would [follow] the movement of the Way. But if one were to accept [that] lodestone can attract iron and use it to attract tile, that would certainly be difficult. Things certainly cannot be assessed according to their weight [alone]. Now, the burning mirror can draw fire [from the sun]; lodestone can draw iron; crabs spoil lacquer; and sunflowers incline to the sun – [but] even if one has enlightened understanding, it is not possible to [explain why] these things are so. Thus investigations by ear and eye are not adequate to discern the principles of things; discussions employing the mind and its conceptions are not adequate to distinguish true and false. Thus he who uses knowledge as the basis for government will have a hard time holding on to his state. Only he who penetrates to Supreme Harmony [太和] and who grasps the responses of the natural will be able to possess it [i.e., his state]. (6.3)

The obscure relation between crabs and lacquer refers to the Chinese medical treatment of urushiol-induced contact dermatitis with crushed shellfish, which supposedly prevents lacquer from drying properly. In Daoist cosmology, Taihe 太和 "Great/Supreme Harmony" is the beginning state before Hundun "primordial chaos".

Chapter six contrasts two pairs of mythological charioteers (the minimum crew of a Chinese chariot included a driver and an archer). Although Wang Liang 王良 and Zaofu 造父 were famously skillful equestrians, Qian Qie 鉗且 and Da Bing 大丙 controlled their horses through mutual resonance – a simile for how a sage ruler should be attuned to his people.

In ancient times, when Wang Liang and Zaofu went driving, [as soon as] they mounted their chariots and took hold of the reins, the horses set themselves in order and wanted to work together. They obediently paced in step with one another; [whether] pulling hard or easing off, they were as one. Their hearts were in tune and their qi harmonious; their bodies [became] more and more light and coordinated. They were content to work hard and happy to go forward; they galloped away as if they would vanish. They went right and left like [the waving of] a whip; they circled around like a jade bracelet. All people of that era considered [Wang Liang and Zaofu] to be superlative [charioteers], but that was because they had not yet seen any [truly] worthy ones. Now consider the charioteering of Qian Qie and Da Bing. They considered reins and bits superfluous, got rid of whips and cast aside goads. Before the chariot began to move, it was starting on its own. Before the horses were given the signal, they were walking on their own. They paced [like the] sun and moved [like the] moon. They flashed [like the] stars and advanced [like the] dark. They raced [like] lightning and leaped [like] ghosts. Advancing or withdrawing, gathering strength or stretching out, they did not see the slightest barrier. Thus, with no gesturing or pointing, with no cursing or scolding, they overtook the wild geese flying to Piled Stone Mountain, passed the jungle fowl [flying to] Guyu Mountain. Their galloping was like flying; their bursts of speed like thread snapping. [It was] like riding an arrow or mounting the wind, like following a cyclone and returning in an instant. At dawn they started from Fusang and set with the sun at Luotang. This was taking something unused and obtaining its usefulness: it was not done by examining things through reason or thought or through the exercise of manual skill. Whenever urgent desires took form in the breasts [of Qian Qie and Da Bing], their quintessential spirits were [already] communicated to the six horses. This was a case of using non-driving to go driving. (6.6)

The Huainanzi developed the idea of politically oriented ganying philosophy. The most perfect form of government is that of wuwei "non-action", for it operates through the ziran "natural" ganying "resonance" of all things. The perfect ruler is the zhenren True Person who, being one with Dao, is in a state of mutual resonance with all things. "What I call non-action [means] ... the undertakings of government will succeed, but [you] personally will not be glorified. [Your] accomplishments will be established, but your reputation will not obtain. [Non-action] does not mean that a stimulus [感] will not produce a response [應] or that a push will not move [something]." (19.2). The Daoist idea of wuwei is interpreted formally in the sense of ganying, "non-interference means to respond spontaneously and harmoniously to stimulus".

In conclusion, Huainanzi scholars delineate the meaning of ganying.

Kan-ying may be defined, in the final analysis, as the power of things to affect and to be affected in such a way as to bring about harmony. This power is based on the persistent affinity and attraction of things that were originally one, but that became scattered when the world began. Through the True Man kan-ying recreates the original unity. As a dynamic pattern kan-ying expresses the full cycle of cosmological, social and psychological integration. Its natural and universal character makes it binding for the cosmos as a whole and also for each and every one of the Ten Thousand Things issuing from Tao. In Chapter Six the foregoing pattern is applied mainly to the realm of human society and, more specifically, to the relations between the perfect ruler – the True Man - and the people. The argument there propounded, that these relations should be based on non-action (wu-wei) understood as resonance (kan-ying), draws its ultimate strength from the cosmological scheme outlined above. We may thus conclude that kan-ying not only forms a logically coherent and philosophically meaningful idea but also provides the focal point around which the Huai-nan Tzu cosmology is structured.

"Resonance" is a central operative principle of the cosmos as conceived by the Huainanzi. The phrase itself means "stimulus" (gan 感) and "response" (ying 應), which is how we have translated it when the Huainanzi refers specifically to the discrete component processes that the term denotes. Fundamentally, "resonance" is a process of dynamic interaction that transcends the limits of time, space, and ordinary linear causality. Through the mechanism of resonance, an event in one location (the "stimulus") produces simultaneous effects in another location (the "response"), even though the two phenomena have no direct spatial or mechanical contact. They may indeed be separated by vast gulfs of space. For example, connections between celestial events (eclipses, planetary motions) and events in the human community were understood as examples of "resonance." For the authors of the Huainanzi, such connections were not coincidence or mere correspondence but dynamic influences exchanged through the energetic medium of qi. All phenomena are both composed of and impelled by qi, and since all currently differentiated qi emerged from an originally undifferentiated Grand One, all qi remains mutually resonantly linked. The pathways of resonance are not random, however. Objects are most sensitive to resonant influences emanating from other objects that share the same constituent form of qi.

=== Lunheng ===
Wang Chong's (c. 80 CE) Lunheng "Discourse Balance" uses ganying once to criticize prognostications from the Fengjia 風家 "School of Wind".

In regard to the Six Passions [六情: cheerfulness, anger, grief, joy, love, and hatred] the expositors of the wind theory maintain that, when the wind blows, robbers and thieves set to work under its influence [感應], but the nature of robbers and thieves cannot move Heaven to send the wind. When the wind blows, it has a strange influence on perverted minds so, that robbers and thieves do their deeds. How can we prove that? Robbers and thieves seeing something, take it away, and beholding an enemy, kill him. This is an off-hand business, and the work of a moment, and not premeditated day and night. When the heavenly afflatus passes, the time of greedy scoundrels and stealthy thieves has come. (43)

Wang Chong first used the word ganlei 感類 as a chapter title "Sympathetic Emotions", and later Chinese literature often used ganlei "sympathy between things of like kind" to describe sympathetic resonance among things of the same category.

When the Yin and the Yang are at variance, calamitous changes supervene. Either they arise from the unexpiated guilt of former generations, or it is the spontaneous action of the fluids. Worthies and sages feel an emotion by sympathy [感類], and, in their agitation, think out for themselves the reason for the calamity, implying some wickedness, having happened. They incriminate themselves, and from fear that they themselves are culpable take every precaution. (55)

According to Forke, "Sages have many affinities with Heaven which manifests itself by them. Therefore Heaven being agitated, they are agitated too."

=== Fengsu Tongyi ===
Ying Shao's (c. 195 CE) Fengsu Tongyi uses ganying twice. The first usage is in a narrative about Crown Prince Dan from the state of Yan (d. 226 BCE) and the future Emperor Qin Shi Huang when he was King of the state of Qin. After Dan escaped from being held hostage by Qin, he sent Jing Ke to assassinate the King, but Heaven miraculously used ganying to save him from death. The second quotes the Shujing "Canon of Shun", Emperor Shun appointed Kui to be Minister of Music, and Kui said, "I smite the (sounding-) stone, I gently strike it, and the various animals lead on one another to dance"; and asks, "if the various animals resonated, (quoting the Yijing) 'How much more must it be so with (the operations of) men! How much more also with the spiritual agency!'."

== Daoism ==
Post-Han Daoism expanded the notion of ganying far beyond the basic Huainanzi (above) ideas that historical events result from mutual resonance between different parts of the universe, and that human beings are agents of mutual resonance who participate fully in the creative transformations of Dao.

Chongxuan 重玄 "Twofold Mystery" Daoism emphasized the phenomena of sympathetic resonance. The Daodejing commentary of Cheng Xuanying 成玄英 (fl. 631–650), an important Twofold Mystery author, differentiated between two kinds of response: tongying 通應 "universal response" and bieying 别應 "differential response". Universal response is that of heaven, which responds out of compassion to all without distinction; differential response, is geared to biekan 别感 "specific stimuli", such as when Laozi gave the Daodejing to Yinxi.

The (7th century) Buddhist-influenced text Daojiao yishu 道教義樞 "Pivotal Meaning of Daoist Teachings" has a section titled Ganying yi 感應義 "The Meaning of Stimulus Response", which depicts the sage as one who spontaneously and appropriately ganying responds to stimuli, and enumerates six categories of stimulus and six of response. The six categories of stimulus are grouped into three pairs: "principal" (正) and "proximate" (附), whether the stimulus is initiated by a self-aware mind or an insentient object, "universal" (普) and specific "preferential" (偏), and "manifest" (顯) and "hidden" (陰) stimuli. The six categories of response are: through "pneuma" (氣), specifically the "primal pneuma" (元氣), a response through "forms" (形), response through "language" (文), "sages" (聖), "worthies" (賢), and "transmitted" response (袭). Furthermore, the Daojiao yishu distinguishes four categories of ganying according to whether the agent and recipient of the stimulus are sentient or insentient, for example, the bell sounding at the collapse of the bronze mountain is in the third category of an insentient object stimulating a response in an insentient object.

== Buddhism ==
Since Chinese philosophers and authors invoked the principle of ganying to explain topics such as seasonal and astronomical cycles, celestial portents, moral retribution, and political upheaval, it is to be expected that the principle would similarly influence the Chinese understanding of Buddhist cosmology, philosophy, and monastic practice. As an example of how the Chinese notion of sympathetic resonance was both powerful enough and malleable enough to lend itself to a variety of Buddhist hermeneutical tasks, Sharf says Guifeng Zongmi employed it in his account of Chan patriarchal succession:

Bodhidharma came from the west only in order to transmit the mind dharma. Thus he himself said: "My dharma is transmitted from mind to mind and does not depend on words or letters." This mind is the pure and original awakening of all sentient beings. It is also known as buddha-nature or numinous awakening 靈覺 ... If you wish to see the Way of the Buddhas, you must awaken to this mind. Therefore, the generations of patriarchs in this lineage transmit only this. If there is a sympathetic resonance and reciprocal tallying [between master and disciple] 感應相契, then although a single flame may be transmitted to a hundred thousand lamps, there will be no difference between them.

Although the Chinese word ganying 感應 was not employed in translating any specific Sanskrit term, it frequently occurs in Chinese Buddhist discussions elucidating the workings of ritual invocation and "jiachi" 加持 "empowerment; assistance" (adhiṣṭhāna). Ganying is the principle underlying the interaction between practitioner and Buddha, the supplicant is said to gan "stimulate; affect" the Buddha, which elicits the Buddha's compassionate ying "response". For example, the expressions ganfo 感佛 "affect the Buddha" or gan rulai 感如來 "stimulate the tathagata". The Buddhist monk Lokaksema's (179 CE) Chinese Banzhou sanmei jing 般舟三昧經 translation of the Pratyutpanna Samādhi Sūtra uses the indigenous notion of ganying "sympathetic resonance" to explain the interaction between the practitioner or supplicant and the grace of buddha or bodhisattva being invoked.

Huiyuan (332-416), the first patriarch of the Pure Land School of Buddhism, used a legend about a bronze bell resonating at the collapse of a distant bronze mountain as an explanation of ganying for the scholar Yin Zhongkan 殷仲堪 (d. 399). The (early 5th century) Shishuo Xinyu "A New Account of the Tales of the World" says,

Yin Chung-k'an once asked the monk Hui-yuan, "What is the substance of the Book of Changes?" Hui-yuan replied, "Stimulus-response [gan 感] is the substance of the Changes." Yin continued, "When the bronze mountain collapsed in the west and the magic bell responded [ying 應] in the east, was that the Book of changes?" Hui-yuan smiled without answering.

The (5th century) Hou Hanshu biography of Fan Ying 樊英 likewise records that during the reign of Emperor Shun of Han (r. 126-144 CE), there was a disaster at the Min Mountains in Shu (modern Sichuan). "A bell below the emperor's hall sounded of itself. Fan Ying explained: 'Min Mountain in Shu (Szechwan) has collapsed. Mountains are mothers in relation to bronze. When the mother collapses, the child cries. In due time Shu reported that indeed a mountain had collapsed, and the time of the collapse matched precisely the time the bell had sounded." Sharf explains ganying resonance as the mechanism through which categorically related but spatially distant phenomena interact, as a mode of seemingly spontaneous response (although not in the sense of "uncaused") natural in a holistic universe of pattern and interdependent order.

Sengyou's Chu sanzang jiji 出三藏記集 preserves a statement by Zhi Dun (314-366).

The principle is different from [the world of] change, and change is different from principle. The teachings are different from the essence [of wisdom, the inner mind of the sage], and the essence is different from the teachings. Therefore, the thousand changes and myriad transformations all take place outside the [realm of] principle, for how could there be any movement in the spirit [of the sage]? Precisely because it does not move, it can endlessly respond to change. The endless change does not denote the presence of the sage in things, nor is the change of things itself the sage. The myriad sounds cause the bell to reverberate—a reverberation that, although single, encompasses [all the myriad sounds]. A myriad things stimulate 感 the sage, and the sage also responds 應 out of stillness. Therefore, the [myriad] sounds are not the same as the [single] reverberation, and the words [of the teachings] are not the same as the wisdom of the sage.

Scholars in the Chengshi zong 成實宗 or Tattvasiddhi School were engaged in a controversy over the nature of stimulus-response. For example, the Dasheng Xuanlun 大乘玄論 "Treatise on the Mystery of the Mahāyāna" by Zhizang 智藏 (458-522) explains ganying,

Stimulus-response is the great tenet of the buddha-dharma, the essential teaching of the many sutras. To "stimulate" means to bring or summon forth, and to "respond" means to go forth and meet in welcome. As all sentient beings possess [the seeds of] goodness, they may induce the Buddhas to descend and take shape in front of them, and [the Buddhas] will meet them in welcome. The principle [is such that they] neither deviate nor overshoot [the mark]. This is called stimulus and response. The common person stimulates but does not respond; the Buddhas respond but do not stimulate; and bodhisattvas both respond and stimulate.

Buddhist scholars in the Tiantai School further developed the doctrine of ganying. Zhiyi (538–597) analyzed the Lotus Sutra in terms of thirty miao 妙 "wonders", coming from the sutra's Chinese title of Miaofa lieahua jing 妙法蓮花經 "Scripture of the Lotus Blossom of the Wondrous Dharma", including the ganying miao 感應妙 "wonder of stimulus-response".

According to the Mahayana Buddhist doctrine of Trikāya (translated as sanshen 三身) "three bodies", a single Buddha has three coexisting buddha-bodies: the dharmakāya (fashen 法身) "truth body" that is identical with transcendent reality and realization of true enlightenment, sambhogakāya (baoshen 報身) "delight/reward body" for the enjoyment of the merits attained as a bodhisattva, and nirmāṇakāya (yingshen 應身) "response body" manifested in response to the need to save all sentient beings. In addition to Chinese yingshen 應身 "response body; resonant body", some schools translate Sanskrit nirmāṇakāya as huashen 化身 "transformation body" or huayingshen 化應身 "transformation response body".

Different Chinese Buddhist schools and texts give sometimes conflicting interpretations of yingshen and huashen. The Northern Wei (386-534) dynasty She dasheng lun 攝大乘論 translation of the Mahāyāna-samgraha directly uses yingshen to translate nirmāṇakāya. The Jinguang mingjing 金光明經 Golden Light Sutra (Suvarṇaprabhāsa Sūtra) distinguishes the huashen "transformation body" (nirmāṇakāya) that can be seen by all beings in whatever form best suits their needs from the yingshen "resonant body" (functionally the saṃbhogakāya), possessing the 32 major signs and 80 minor marks of a Buddha, that is only manifest to buddhas and bodhisattvas. The Dasheng qixin lun 大乘起信論 or Awakening of Faith in the Mahayana makes no distinction between the two, with the yingshen "response body" being the Buddha of the 32 signs who revealed himself to the earthly disciples.

Sharf explains that the Chinese understanding of yingshen "resonant/response [buddha-]body" incorporates the Buddhist notion of nirmāṇakāya a corporeal (or seemingly corporeal) body manifest in response to the needs of suffering beings and the Chinese cosmological principles that explain the power to produce such bodies in terms of wuwei nonaction and ganying sympathetic resonance. "The sage, bodhisattva, or buddha, through the principle of nonaction, becomes at one with the universe, acquires the attributes of stillness and harmonious balance, and, without any premeditation or will of his own, spontaneously responds to the stimuli of the world around him, manifesting bodies wherever and whenever the need arises."

Paralleling the use of ganying 感應 in Chinese Buddhism, Japanese Buddhism borrowed the Sino-Japanese loanword kannō 感應. For example, Kannō-ji is a Buddhist temple on Mount Kabutoyama in Nishinomiya, Hyōgo.

== Neo-Confucianism ==
During the Song dynasty (960-1276), the cosmological writings of the Neo-Confucianists, especially the Cheng-Zhu school, gave ganying its "perfect expression".

The British sinologist Angus Charles Graham says the Chinese "correlative cosmology" concepts of gan and ying occupy the same place in Song philosophy as causation in the West.

If it is assumed that things consist of inert matter, it is natural to think in terms of "effect" which passively allow themselves to be pushed by "causes". But if inert matter is only the essentially active ether ch'i in an impure state, this kind of action will only be of minor importance; in the purer ether, when A acts on B, B will not only be moved by it, but will respond actively.

Noting that Chinese ganying has no exact English equivalent, the Philippine scholar in Chinese philosophy Antonio Cua translates it as "influence and response" or "responding to influence", and proposes a Neo-Confucian conception of the world in which natural events or states of affairs are viewed as an open set of influences that call for some sort of human responses or actions. This conception of a practical rather than a theoretical causation is a model or "an imaginative schema for guiding actions toward the Confucian vision of central harmony".

The Jishanji 霽山集 "Clear Mountain Collection" by the Song author Lin Jingxi 林景熙 (1242-1310) praised psychological resonance.

Scholars of old time said that the mind is originally empty, and only because of this can it respond to natural things [yingwu 應物] without prejudices (lit. traces, [ji 迹]) left behind to influence later vision). Only the empty mind [xuxin 虚心] can respond to the things of Nature. Though everything resonates with the mind, the mind should be as if it had never resonated, and things should not remain in it. But once the mind has received (impressions of) natural things, they tend to remain and not to disappear, thus leaving traces in the mind. (These affect later seeing and thinking, so that the mind is not truly 'empty' and unbiased.) It should be like a river gorge with swans flying overhead; the river has no desire to retain the swan, yet the swan's passage is traced out by its shadow without any omission.

== Chinese folk religion ==
Not only was the notion of ganying resonance situated in the cultural domains of Daoism, Confucianism, and Buddhism, but also in Chinese folk religion, with a meaning of "divine retribution; moral retribution". The related term baoying 报應 "moral retribution" originated from Buddhist doctrines of karma and reincarnation, and became a fundamental principle of Chinese popular religious belief and practice.

Ganying "moral retribution" was central to the genre of popular religious texts known as shànshū 善書 (lit. "good book") "moral-instruction book; moral tract". It specifically referred to the principle of "tit-for-tat moral retribution", based upon the belief that one's good and evil deeds will result in corresponding rewards and punishments, typically manifest as the lengthening or shortening of one's life.

The (c. 12th century) anonymous Song dynasty compilation Taishang ganying pian 太上感應篇 "Folios of the Most High on Retribution" was the classic in the shanshu genre, and one of the most widely circulated Daoist works in late imperial China. "Cloud Capped Mountain" story exemplifies Taishang ganying pian content.

Fang Shih-k'o, a native of Hsing-an, had been very sickly from a child. Afterwards he began to enquire into the mysteries of Taoism, with a view of procuring the secret of immortality. Arrived one day at the Cloud-capped Monntain, he met a person of strange appearance, who said, "With such a face as yours, how can you expect to get the blessings that you seek? It is impossible—unless you first plant a root of goodness." Then Shih-k'o went home; and although he was a poor man he found means to print off an edition of the Book of Recompenses and distribute copies among his friends. By the time he had printed ten pages, his sickness was half-cured; when the work was completed, he found himself entirely recovered; and from that time forward he became robust in body, and quite different from what he had been before in appearance.

== Scientific loanwords ==
Beginning with the Qing dynasty (1644-1912), the Chinese language borrowed many scientific terms as loanwords from Western languages.

Examples of gǎnyìng scientifically meaning "cause-effect; stimulus-response" include.

- chāo gǎnyìng lì 超感應力 extrasensory perception
- gǎnyìng cuòwù 感應錯誤 induced error (linguistics)
- gǎnyìng diànliú 感應電流 faradic current
- gǎnyìngquān 感應圈 induction coil
- guāngdù gǎnyìng qì 光度感應器 photodetector
- jiēchù gǎnyìng 接觸感應 psychometry (paranormal)
- wú bǐng gǎnyìng cǎo 無柄感應草 Biophytum umbraculum
- xīnlíng gǎnyìng 心靈感應 telepathy
- zhēnkōng gǎnyìng róngliàn 真空感應熔煉 vacuum induction melting
- zìyóu gǎnyìng shuāijiǎn 自由感應衰減 free induction decay
