= Antonio Cua =

American philosopher

Antonio S. Cua (July 23, 1932 – March 27, 2007) was an eminent scholar in Chinese philosophy and comparative philosophy who was professor emeritus of philosophy at The Catholic University of America. Cua was primarily interested in Western moral philosophy, moral psychology and Chinese ethics, in particular Confucian ethics. He was the author of many important scholarly works, and the chief editor of the Encyclopedia of Chinese Philosophy, the first English-language encyclopedia on 'Chinese philosophy'.

== Early years ==
Cua was born into a Filipino Chinese family doing commercial business in Manila. He graduated from Far Eastern University in Manila in 1952 and came to the United States for graduate studies in philosophy. He received a master's degree in 1954 and a PhD in 1958, both from the University of California at Berkeley.

== Career ==
From 1958 to 1962, Cua taught at Ohio University in Athens, Ohio. He then served as professor of philosophy and chairman of the department at the State University of New York at Oswego from 1962 to 1969.

At The Catholic University of America, he taught philosophy in the School of Philosophy from 1969 to 1995. He retired in 1996 and was professor emeritus until his death. He died in Bethesda, Maryland in 2007.

He was president of several organizations, including the International Society for Chinese Philosophy, the Society for Asian and Comparative Philosophy and the Association for Asian Studies. He held leadership roles in several other associations.

== Works ==
Cua was the author of numerous scholarly works and the chief editor of the Encyclopedia of Chinese Philosophy. The volume, the first of its kind, contains entries on major schools, thinkers, works and concepts in Chinese philosophy and is considered the most comprehensive scholarly reference book with exact information and original interpretation of Chinese philosophy and its history.

His books include "Reason and Virtue: A Study in the Ethics of Richard Price" (1966, revised 1998), in which he studied Price, an 18th-century moral and political philosopher; "Dimensions of Moral Creativity" (1978), which focused on the role of paradigmatic individuals as the concrete embodiment of moral principles and ideals; and "Ethical Argumentation" (1985), his first attempt to develop a Confucian theory of ethical argumentation and moral epistemology.

In his "Moral Vision and Tradition: Essays in Chinese Ethics" (1998), Cua offered a comprehensive philosophical study of Confucian ethics, its basic insights and its relevance to contemporary Western moral philosophy.

His last work was "Human Nature, Ritual and History: Studies in Xunzi and Chinese Philosophy" (2005), which reflected his authority in studies on Xunzi, one of the greatest Confucian philosophers in ancient China.

"Cua's total body of work on Xunzi is the deepest and richest work in English on this thinker.... Cua is one of the great senior figures in the field, and this book will be a useful reference in courses in Chinese and comparative studies," David Wong, a philosophy professor and department chair at Duke University, said in 2005.

== Bibliography ==
- Human Nature, Ritual, And History: Studies In Xunzi And Chinese Philosophy (Studies in Philosophy and the History of Philosophy), Antonio S. Cua (Author), Catholic University of America Press (April 2005)
- Encyclopedia of Chinese Philosophy, Antonio S. Cua (Editor), Routledge, 2003.
- Moral Vision and Tradition: Essays in Chinese Ethics (Studies in Philosophy and the History of Philosophy), Antonio S. Cua (Author), Catholic University of America Press (April 1998)
- Ethical Argumentation: A Study in Hsun Tzu's Moral Epistemology, Antonio S. Cua (Author), Univ of Hawaii Pr (May 1985).
- Unity of Knowledge and Action: A Study in Wang Yang-Ming's Moral Psychology, Antonio S. Cua (Author), Univ of Hawaii Pr (May 1982)
- Dimensions of Moral Creativity: Paradigms, Principles, and Ideals, Antonio S. Cua (Author), Pennsylvania State Univ Pr (June 1979)
- Reason and Virtue: A Study in the Ethics of Richard Price., Antonio S. Cua (Author), Ohio University Press, (1966)
