= Wang Jia (Taoist) =

Wang Jia (Chinese: 王嘉; pinyin: Wáng Jiā; died 390 CE), courtesy name Zinian (子年), was a Chinese Taoist hermit and scholar.

He is known as the compiler of 拾遺記 (Shi Yi Ji), whose title has been variously translated as Record of Heretofore Lost Works, Researches into Lost Records, Record of Gleanings, or Forgotten Tales. This work is based on "apocryphal" versions of early (legendary) Chinese history, which must have been produced during the Eastern Han dynasty. For example, his version of the story of Yu the Great has a yellow dragon and a black turtle helping Yu to create the geographical features of China, and to name them - details not found in Shan Hai Jing
