= Shi Yi Ji =

4th-century Chinese mythological / historical treatise compiled by Wang Jia

Shi Yi Ji (Chinese: 拾遺記; pinyin: Shíyí Jì) is a Chinese mythological / historical treatise compiled by the Taoist scholar Wang Jia (died 390). The title of the work has been variously translated into English as Record of Heretofore Lost Works, Researches into Lost Records, Record of Gleanings, or Forgotten Tales.

A page from the volume two of Shi Yi Ji in a Ming dynasty printed edition

The verb shiyi (拾遺) is translated by modern dictionaries as "to appropriate lost property", or, when used in book titles, "to make up for omissions". Accordingly, the work is based on "apocryphal" versions of early (legendary) Chinese history, which must have been produced during the Eastern Han dynasty. For example, Shi Yi Ji's version of the story of Yu the Great has a yellow dragon and a black turtle helping Yu to create the geographical features of China, and to name them – details not found in the Classic of Mountains and Seas.
