= List of early Chinese texts =

Many early Chinese texts were composed before the End of the Han dynasty in 220 CE. They involved numerous Confucian classics, such as the Four Books and Five Classics, alongside poetry, dictionaries, histories and surveys on topics such as mathematics, astronomy, music and medicine, among others.

== B ==
- Baihu tong 白虎通, 1 c. CE

== C ==
- Cantongqi
- Chu Silk Manuscript
- Chuci
- Chunqiu
- Chunqiu Fanlu
- Chunqiu Gongyang zhuan
- Chunqiu Guliang zhuan
- Chunqiu shiyu

== D ==
- Da Dai Liji
- Daodejing
- Daozang Wang Bi ben Laozi
- Dengxizi
- Dong guan Han ji
- Duduan

== E ==
- Erya

== F ==
- Fangyan
- Fayan
- Fengsu Tongyi

== G ==
- Gongsun Longzi
- Guanzi (text)
- Guoyu

== H ==
- Han Feizi
- Han shi waizhuan
- Hanshu (Yiwenzhi)
- Hei An Zhuan [Epic of Darkness]
- Heguanzi
- Heshang Gong ben Laozi ji Heshang Gong zhu
- Huainanzi
- Huangdi neijing suwen
- Huangdi sijing

== J ==
- Jiuzhang suanshu
- Jizhong Zhoushu

== K ==
- Kongzi jiayu 孔子家語

== L ==
- Laozi Daodejing
- Lienü zhuan
- Liexian Zhuan
- Liezi
- Liji
- Lingshu Jing
- Liutao
- Lunheng
- Lunyu (Analects)
- Lüshi Chunqiu

== M ==
- Maoshi
- Mengzi
- Mozi
- Mu Tianzi Zhuan (Tale of King Mu)

== N ==
- Nanhua zhenjing
- Nanjing

== Q ==
- Qianfu lun
- Qian Hanji

== R ==
- Rong Cheng shi 容成氏 (Shanghai Museum corpus)

== S ==
- Sanguo Yanyi (Romance of The Three Kingdoms)
- Shang Jun Shu
- Shangshu
- Shangshu dazhuan
- Shanhaijing
- Shennong Ben Cao Jing
- Shenzi (Shen Buhai)
- Shenzi (Shen Dao)
- Shiji
- Shijing
- Shiming
- Shizhoupian
- Shizi
- Shuihudi Qinmu zhujian (Shuihudi Qin bamboo texts)
- Shujing
- Shuowen Jiezi (aka Shuowen)
- Shuoyuan
- Sima fa
- Sunzi bingfa
- Sun Bin bingfa

== T ==
- Taixuanjing
- Taiyi Shengshui
- Tang Yu zhi Dao 唐虞之道 (Guodian)

== W ==
- Wei Liaozi
- Wenzi
- Wushi'er bingfang
- Wuwei Handai yijian
- Wu Yue chunqiu
- Wuzi

== X ==
- Xiaojing
- Xinlun
- Xinshu
- Xinxu
- Xunzi

== Y ==
- Yu Xin
- Yan danzi
- Yantie lun (Discourses on Salt and Iron)
- Yanzi chunqiu
- Yijing
- Yili
- Yilin
- Yinwenzi 尹文子
- Yizhoushu
- Yuejue shu
- Yuejing (Classic of Music)
- Yuliaozi

== Z ==
- Zhanguo ce
- Zhonglun
- Zhoubi suanjing
- Zhouli
- Zhouyi
- Zhuangzi
- Zhushu jinian
- Zi Gao 子羔 (Shanghai Museum corpus)
- Zuozhuan

== See also ==
- List of early medieval Chinese texts
