= Xinxu =

Chinese collection of stories

A page from a printed edition of Xinxu, from the National Library of China Publishing House

Xinxu (Chinese: 新序; pinyin: Xīnxù; Wade–Giles: Hsin-hsü; "New arrangements") is a collection of stories from the period of the Spring and Autumn Annals up to the Han dynasty, predominantly of historical content, compiled by Liu Xiang (刘向) in the time of the Western Han dynasty. It originally consisting of 30 scrolls, only 10 have survived, containing a total of 166 passages.

Ikeda Shūzō says, that the work was composed like the Lienü zhuan ("Biographies of Exemplary Women") and the Shuoyuan ("Garden of Eloquence") with the aim of instructing the emperor and promoting royal ("wangdao" 王道) governance; in particular, it stands in a close "brotherly relationship" with the latter work.

It recounts already well-known stories that are presented in a new and different arrangement. The work mainly deals with the period of the Spring and Autumn era.

The materials largely originate from works such as Lüshi chunqiu, Hanshi waizhuan, Xunzi, Zhuangzi, Han Feizi, the "Three Commentaries on the Spring and Autumn Annals", Guoyu, Zhanguo ce, and the Shiji. In some cases, they are direct borrowings; in others, they are versions selected, abridged, and edited by Liu Xiang, which accounts for the numerous variations.

Liu Xiang compiled this book with the aim of using the successes and failures of the ancients as a clear mirror for governance in his own dynasty, reflecting his political philosophy, emphasizing virtuous rule and benevolence, the appointment of worthy officials, and the esteem of wise counsel and righteousness.

According to the Japanese scholar Ikeda Shūzō (池田秀三), the work is particularly strongly influenced by the Hanshi waizhuan. Its conceptual content is not as clearly developed as in the Shuoyuan, likely because of its length, but it corresponds to it in essence. The main themes are the esteem of the virtuous, the recommendation of good governance, criticism of excess and change, and praise for integrity and moral purity. While ideas from the Mohists and Legalists also appear, Confucian thought forms the foundation of the work. Furthermore, it is significant for research on the Shijing, serving as an important source for the Lu School of interpretation.

The work is also regarded f.e. as one of the classical texts relevant to the Zhuangzi.

== Contents ==
Contents of the Xinxu 新序:

1–5. Zashi 雜事 Miscellaneous affairs
6. Cishe 刺奢 Indulgent and intrigant persons
7. Jieshi 節士 Modest and sincere persons
8. Yiyong 義勇 Upright and brave persons
9–10. Shanmou 善謀 Excellent tacticians

The Hanyu da zidian f.e. is using the edition in the Sibu congkan, a photographic reproduction of a Song edition transmitted during the Jiajing era [1522–1566] of the Ming dynasty.

== See also ==
- Han shi waizhuan
- Shuoyuan

== Bibliography ==
- Xinxu (Sibu congkan edition)
- Li Xueqin, and Lü Wenyu (eds.): Siku da cidian 四庫大辭典. 2 vols. Changchun: Jilin daxue chubanshe 1996, p. 1545ab
- Ikeda Shūzō 池田秀三: Article "新序"（しんじょ）, in: Chūgoku shisō jiten 中国思想辞典. Toshikuni Hihara 日原利国 (ed.), Kenbun Shuppan 研文出版 1984. ISBN 487636043X
