= Guliang Chi =

Writer of the Guliang Zhuan

Guliang Chi 穀梁赤
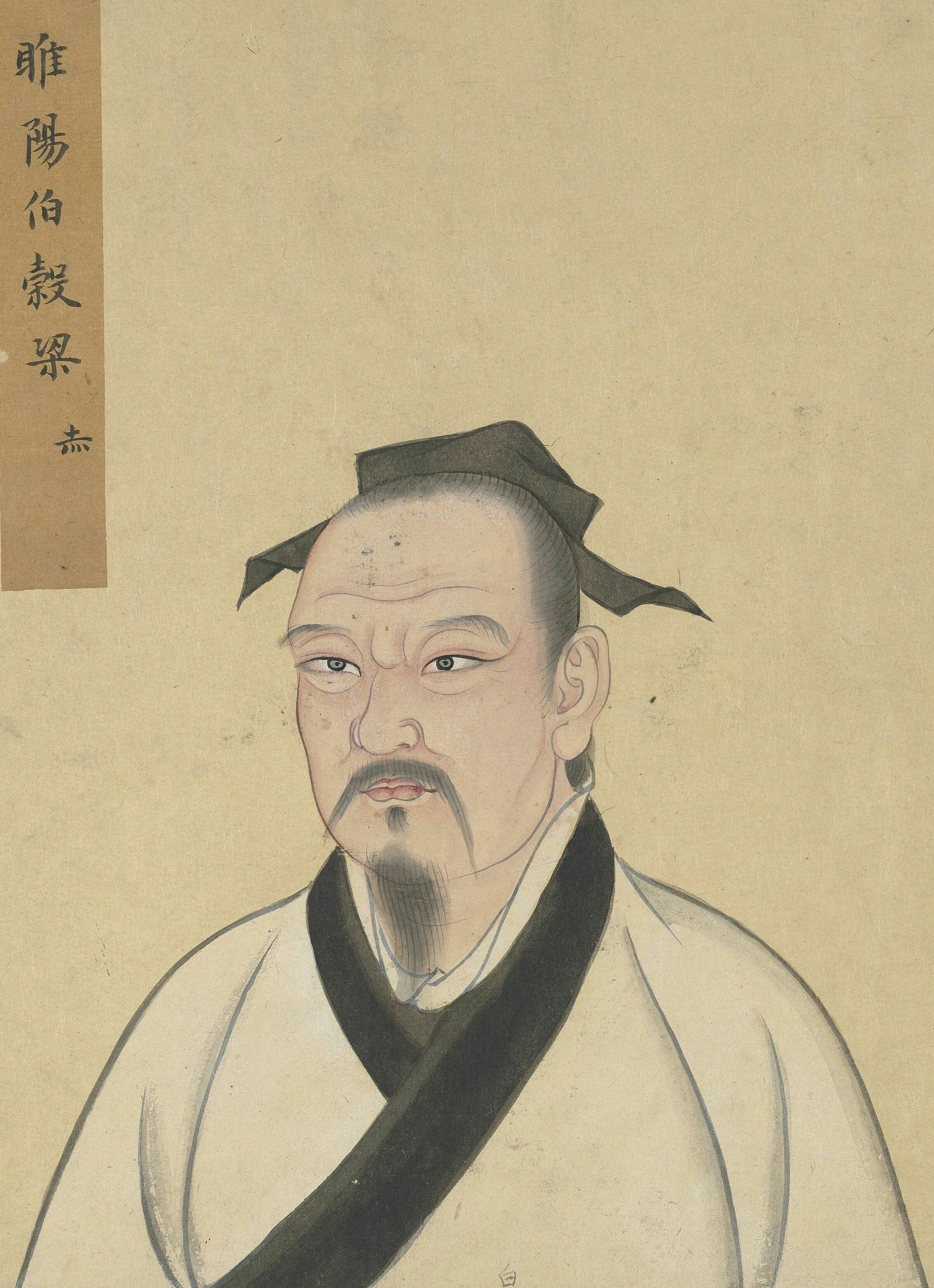
- Yuan dynasty portrait.
- Born: State of Lu
- Occupations: Philosopher; Educator

Academic background
- Influences: Bu Shang

Academic work
- School or tradition: Confucianism
- Main interests: Spring and Autumn Annals
- Notable works: Guliang Zhuan
- Influenced: Emperor Xuan of Han; Cai Qianqiu; Duke Jiang of Xiaqu

Guliang Chi
- Chinese: 穀梁赤
Transcriptions
Standard Mandarin
- Hanyu Pinyin: Gǔliáng Chì
- Bopomofo: ㄍㄨˇ ㄌㄧㄤˊ ㄔˋ
- Wade–Giles: ku^{3}liang^{2} ch'ih^{4}
Yue: Cantonese
- Jyutping: guk^{1}loeng^{4} cek^{3}
Middle Chinese
- Middle Chinese: kuwkljang tsyhek
Old Chinese
- Baxter–Sagart (2014): /*[k]ˤokraŋ [t-qʰ](r)Ak/
- Zhengzhang: /*kloːɡraŋ kʰljaɡ/

Guliang Chi was an educator and philosopher of the State of Lu and disciple of Confucius and Bu Shang. He transmitted the Spring and Autumn Annals to his students, from which his notes then became the Guliang Zhuan.

== Names ==
Guliang Chi's name was a subject of debate for scholars. The name Chi 赤 comes from the Anthology of Cai Zhonglang and the Book of Han. Yan Shigu said that Guliang's personal name was Xi 喜, Ruan Xiaoxu said that his name was Shu 淑 or Chu 俶, and Wang Chong said that his name was Zhi 寘 in Lunheng.

== Influence ==
Little is known about Guliang's life outside of him transmitting the Spring and Autumn Annals as an educator. Classical texts show that his commentary enjoyed considerable favour with the literati, with emperors such as Emperor Xuan of Han heavily promoting the text, and later educators, particularly from Guliang's home state of Lu teaching the thought within. The Book of Han mentions Duke Jiang of Xiaqu as studying the Guliang tradition, who debated interpretation of the Spring and Autumn Annals with Dong Zhongshu, who studied the Gongyang tradition before Emperor Xuan of Han. Another individual, Cai Qianqiu, did the same, and was promoted. It was from these debates that the Guliang commentary was established and promoted by the Han dynasty.
