= Mao Heng =

Confucian scholar (c. 3rd or 2nd century BC)

- 毛亨
- Mao (毛) in seal script.
- Born: c. 3rd - 2nd Century B.C. Lu or Zhao; Modern-day Jize County, Hebei
- Occupation: Scholar

Academic background
- Influences: Confucius; Zi Xia; Xun Kuang

Academic work
- School or tradition: Confucianism; Mao School
- Main interests: Classic of Poetry
- Notable works: Mao Shi; Mao's Old Teachings of the Classic of Poetry (毛詩故訓傳)
- Influenced: Mao Chang (毛萇, disputed); Zheng Xuan; Kong Yingda; Emperor Ping of Han; Xu Shen

Chinese name
- Chinese: 毛亨
Transcriptions
Standard Mandarin
- Hanyu Pinyin: máo hēng
- Bopomofo: ㄇㄠˊ ㄏㄥ
- Wade–Giles: mao^{2} hêng^{1}
Middle Chinese
- Middle Chinese: maw xaeng
Old Chinese
- Baxter–Sagart (2014): /*C.mˤaw qʰˤraŋ/
- Zhengzhang: /*maːw qʰraːŋ/

Mao Heng was a Confucian scholar from either the Warring States period of Eastern Zhou or early Western Han. He is known for his annotations to the Classic of Poetry, which still impact understanding of the works within to this day.

== Name ==
Mao Heng is also known as Da Mao Gong (大毛公). The name 'Mao Heng' comes from an identification by Lu Ji (陸璣), which has since become a common reference for the historical figure. The name does not appear in the earliest accounts such as the Book of Han, where he is called Mao Gong (毛公), which could also be read as "The Duke of Mao" or as an honorific; the latter is the most common interpretation.

== Biography ==
=== Early life ===
Little is known about Mao Heng's early life, and it is subject to much debate. Mao Heng is thought to be a descendent of Mao Sui (毛遂). Lu Ji records that he was born in the State of Lu, whilst the Book of Han records he was of the State of Zhao. The Guangyun records a tradition that the Mao clan had originally lived in the Julu Commandery before moving to Xingyang, and identifies Mao Chang as Mao Heng's congzi (從子), a young relative often interpreted as a nephew. Historical gazetteers of Jize County (雞澤縣), Hebei, identified Mao Sui and Mao Chang as natives of the area, while later local researchers argued that Mao Heng belonged to the same lineage. In 2008, the China Mao Clan Research Association (中國毛氏研究) issued a certificate to Jize County, with evidence that Handan (邯鄲) is the modern birthplace of Mao Sui and the subsequent Mao clan. It is thought that Maoguanying (毛官營) may be the precise location based on the placename.

=== Academic career ===
Mao Heng studied the Classic of Poetry, taking teachings from Xun Kuang. The teachings transmitted were said to have originated from Zi Xia and became known as the Mao School (毛公之學). This school of Classic of Poetry interpretation coexisted alongside three other schools of thought, those from Yuan Gu of Qi, Shen Pei of Lu, and Han Ying's school. Ban Gu, the author of the Book of Han, claims that the Lu School (魯家) was the closest to the ancient meanings.

Mao Heng's commentary eventually became a full annotated edition of the Classic of Poetry, which today is commonly known as the Maoshi (毛詩). These annotations typically reflect standard Western Han interpretations of the poem, be they historical, political, or otherwise. The Book of Han records this 29-volume work, as well as his commentary, the 30-volume Mao's Old Teachings of the Classic of Poetry (毛詩故訓傳). Neither work is preserved in its entirety. The Mao Shi is commonly interpreted as the Old Text Classic of Poetry, a jing (經), and the latter text as his commentary, a zhuan (傳). What exists today is the Mao Commentary, which is a synthesis of the two, plus Zheng Xuan's later work.

== Legacy ==
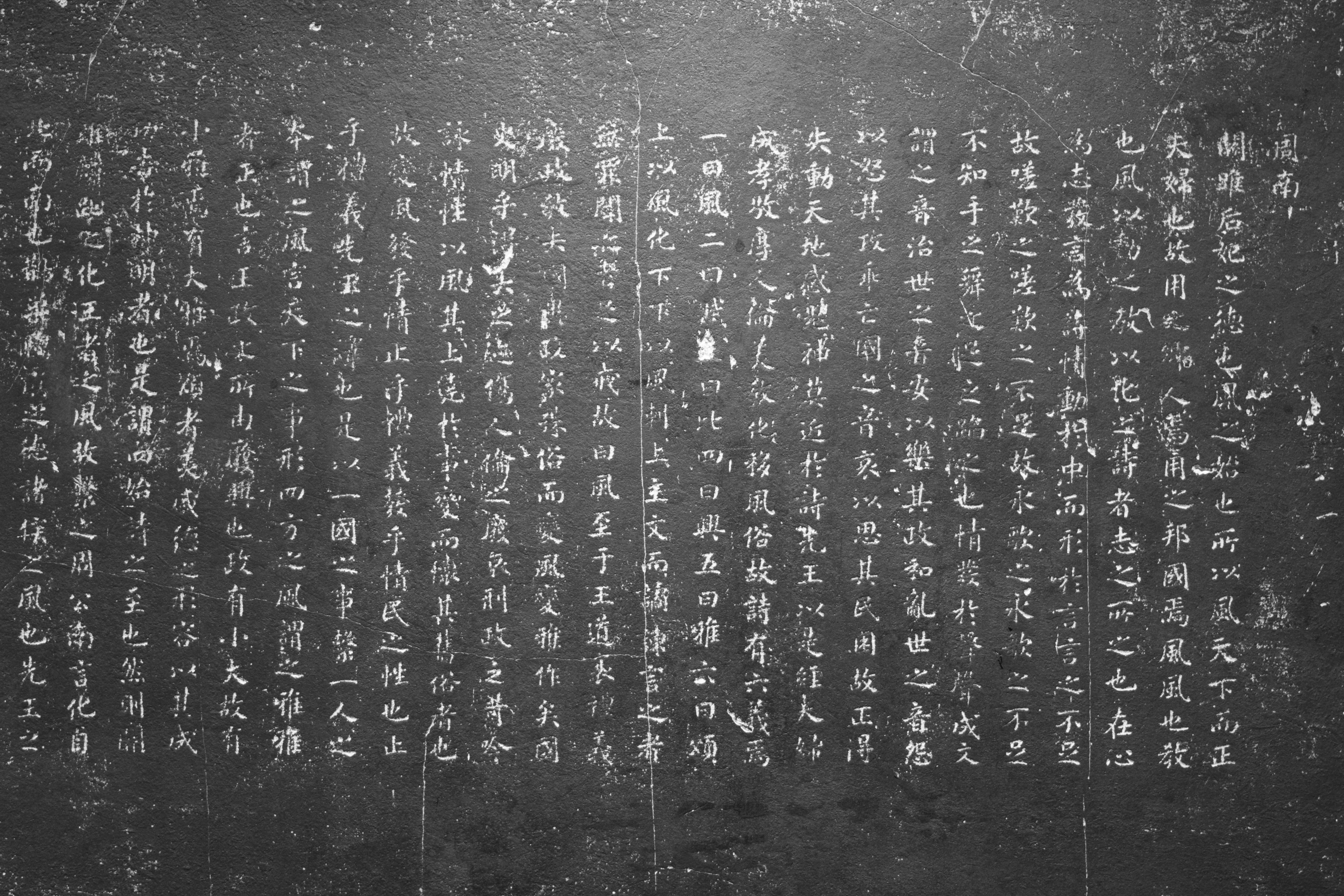
The Preface to the Mao Shi from the Southern Song Imperial Academy Stone Classic, at the Hangzhou Confucius Temple.

Copy of The Sun and Moon (日月) from the Bei feng (邶風) written in stone. Sichuan Museum.

After Mao Heng's death, Mao Chang (毛萇) of Zhao, traditionally identified as his student or descendent, transmitted his work on the Classic of Poetry. According to Zheng Xuan, King Xian of Hejian (河間獻王) obtained the Mao Heng's commentary and appointed Mao Chang as one of his boshi (博士). However, Liang Cai (2011) notes that accounts of Mao Heng diverged over time and became considerably more embellished, and that Mao Heng and Mao Chang may have been the same person, as the earliest Han sources refer simply to one Mao Gong. Only later traditions distinguished them as Mao Heng and Mao Chang, then over time supplied them with separate names, origins, and positions.

Mao Heng's work would not be officially recognised until the reign of Emperor Ping of Han. Over time, it became the standard mode of interpretation of the classic, in part because it was claimed to have descended from the interpretations of Confucius and his students. Xu Shen, the writer of Shuowen Jiezi, almost exclusively quotes from Mao's rendition.

Zheng Xuan would build on Mao's work to produce his own annotated edition of the classic, which would later be synthesised by Tang dynasty scholar Kong Yingda to produce Maoshi Zhengyi, preserved in Siku Quanshu. This version would use Mao Heng's commentary and Zheng Xuan's annotations together. Over time, the Lu, Qi, and Han Ying schools would die out, and the Mao Commentary became the received text for the Classic of Poetry. Only fragments of the Lu School's rendition survive today, amongst the Xiping Stone Classics.
