= List of early medieval Chinese texts =

Most of the works listed date from a time span, which covered approximately from the 2nd century to the early 7th century CE, that means the late Han period (2nd century) through the Three Kingdoms and the Wei–Jin era up to the Southern and Northern Dynasties (3rd–6th centuries) and the early Sui/Tang period (7th century). The works listed here encompass a wide range of historical, literary, and religious texts from pre-modern China. They include official dynastic histories, biographical collections, poetic anthologies, as well as medical and encyclopedic treatises. Together, they reflect the rich cultural, political, and intellectual traditions spanning from antiquity through the Six Dynasties period.

== Texts ==
Note: The Chinese character ji (Chinese: 集; pinyin: jí) means “collection of writings”, shu (simplified Chinese: 书; traditional Chinese: 書; pinyin: shū) means “book”, an other ji (simplified Chinese: 记; traditional Chinese: 記; pinyin: jì) means “notes; records”, shi (Chinese: 史; pinyin: shǐ) means “history”, etc.

== B ==
- Bao Zhao ji 鮑照集 → Bao Zhao
- Baopuzi 抱朴子
- Bei Qi shu 北齊書
- Beishi 北史
- Beitang shuchao 北堂書鈔
- Biqiuni zhuan 比丘尼傳
- Bowu zhi 博物志

== C ==
- Cao Zhi ji 曹植集 → Cao Zhi
- Chen shu 陳書
- Chenggong Sui ji 成公綏集
- Chuxue ji 初學記

== D ==
- Diaoyu ji 调玉集
- Diwang shiji 帝王世紀

== F ==
- Foguo ji 佛國記
- Fu Xuan ji 傅玄集

== G ==
- Gaoseng zhuan 高僧傳
- Gaoshi zhuan 高士傳
- Ge xianweng Zhouhou beijifang 葛仙翁肘後備急方
- Guang Hongming ji 廣弘明集

== H ==
- Han Wei Liuchao baisanjia ji 漢魏六朝百三家集
- He Chengtian ji 何承天集
- He Xun ji 何遜集
- Hongmingji 弘明集
- Hou Han shu 後漢書
- Huanyuan ji 還冤記
- Huayang guo zhi 華陽國志

== J ==
- Jiankang shilu 建康實錄
- Jin shu 晉書
- Jing-Chu suishiji 荊楚歲時記
- Jinlouzi 金樓子

== K ==
- Kong Zhigui ji 孔稚挂集

== L ==
- Liang Jianwendi ji 梁簡文帝集 → Liang Jianwendi
- Liang shu 梁書
- Liang Wudi ji 梁武帝集 → Liang Wudi
- Liang Yuandi ji 梁元帝集 → Liang Yuandi
- Liuzi 劉子
- Lu Ji ji 陸機集 → Lu Ji
- Lu Yun ji 陸雲集 → Lu Yun
- Luoyang qielan ji 洛陽伽藍記

== N ==
- Nan Qi shu 南齊書
- Nan shi 南史
- Niu Hong ji 牛弘集

== P ==
- Pan Yue ji 潘岳集 → Pan Yue

== Q ==
- Qieyun 切韻
- Qimin yaoshu 齊民要術
- Quan shanggu Sandai Qin Han Sanguo Liuchao wen 全上古三代秦漢三國六朝文

== R ==
- Renwu zhi 人物志

== S ==
- Sanguo zhi 三國志
- Shanghan lun 傷寒論
- Shennong bencao jing 神農本草經
- Shenxian zhuan 神仙傳
- Shi pin 詩品
- Shiliuguo chunqiu 十六國春秋
- Shishuo xinyu 世說新語
- Shiyi ji 拾遺記
- Shu Xi ji 束晳集
- Shuijing zhu 水經注
- Shuyi ji 述異記
- Song shu 宋書
- Soushen ji 搜神記
- Sui shu 隋書
- Sun Chuo ji 孫縛集

== T ==
- Taiping yulan 太平御覽
- Tao Yuanming ji 陶淵明集 → Tao Yuanming
- Tong dian 通典

== W ==
- Wang Shuhe Maijing 王叔和脈經
- Wei shu 魏書
- Wei Wendi ji 魏文帝集 → Wei Wendi
- Wei Wudi ji 魏武帝集 → Wei Wudi
- Wen xuan 文選
- Wenxin diaolong 文心雕龍
- Wu Jun ji 吳均集

== X ==
- Xiao Tong ji 簫統集
- Xiaozi zhuan 孝子傳
- Xie Huilian ji 謝惠連集
- Xie Lingyun ji 謝靈運集
- Xie Tiao ji 謝跳集
- Xu Gaoseng zhuan 續高僧傳
- Xun Xu ji 荀勖集

== Y ==
- Yanshi jiaxun 顏氏家訓
- Yezhong ji 鄴中記
- Ying Qu ji 應璩集
- Yiwen leiju 藝文類聚
- Yu Xin ji 庾信集
- Yuan Shu ji 袁淑集
- Yuefu shiji 樂府詩集
- Yulin 語林
- Yutai xinyong 玉臺新詠
- Yuzhu baodian 玉獨寳典

== Z ==
- Zhang Hua ji 張華集 → Zhang Hua
- Zhang Rong ji 張融集 → Zhang Rong
- Zhou shu 周書
- Zuo Si ji 左思集 → Zuo Si

== See also ==
- List of early Chinese texts
