= Unity of Heaven and humanity =

Chinese philosophical concept

Unity of Heaven and humanity (Chinese: 天人合一; pinyin: Tiān rén héyī) is an ancient Chinese philosophical concept that is found common across many Chinese religions and philosophies. The basic idea is that societal phenomena such as physiology, ethics, and politics of humanity are direct reflections of Tian, "heaven" or "nature."

== History ==
The idea finds its origins in ancient Chinese religion, in which humans were possessed by spirits and in a trance. This early shamanistic experience can still be found in forms of present-day Chinese folk religion. The notion was discussed as early as the Spring and Autumn Warring States period, but was later elaborated within Confucianism, Daoism, and Buddhism.

=== Confucianism ===
It was cited by Dong Zhongshu in the Han Dynasty as heaven and mankind induction, and by Cheng-Zhu school of Neo-Confucianism is derived from the theory of the Divine Principle.

=== Daoism ===
In Daoism, Tian or "Heaven" is nature, and humanity is a part of nature, as the saying goes: "If there is man, there is also heaven; if there is heaven, there is also heaven. "Heaven and earth are born with me, and all things are one with me" (Zhuangzi).

Heaven is sometimes seen as synonymous with the Dao or a natural energy that can be accessed by living in accordance with the Dao.

=== Chinese medicine ===
The traditional Chinese medicine text Huangdi Neijing advocates the unity of Heaven and humanity. Huangdi Neijing emphasizes that man "corresponds to heaven and earth, is in harmony with the four seasons, and that man participates in heaven and earth" (Lingshu - Pricking the Joints of True Evil), that "man participates with heaven and earth" (Lingshu - The Dew of the Year, Lingshu - Jing Shui), and that "he is as one with heaven and earth" (Suwen - The Essence of Pulse). It is believed that "heaven", as an objective existence independent of human spiritual consciousness, and "man", as a subject with spiritual consciousness, have a unified origin, properties, structure and laws.

== Outside Chinese thought ==
In the Western world, the idea of "unity of God and humanity" in Ancient Greece, Christianity, and Islam is also similar to the Chinese idea of "unity of Heaven and humanity," but there are still some differences in nature. In ancient Greece, the "unity of God and humanity" could only be achieved by a sorcerer with special powers; whereas Christianity believes that anyone who confesses his sins and accepts the salvation of God's only Son, Jesus Christ, is given authority by Jesus to become a child of God and enter eternal life. The Islamic view emphasizes the "good works" that believers are to observe.

In Indian culture, the main theme of the great classic Upanishads is Unity of Brahman (Moksha), which is a tenet practiced by deep yogis and coincides with the Chinese idea of the unity of heaven and man.

== See also ==
- Unity of knowledge and action
- Unity of ritual and government
- Pavilion of Harmony
- Microcosm–macrocosm analogy
