= Jiang Qing (Confucian) =

Chinese Confucian (born 1953)

Jiang Qing (simplified Chinese: 蒋庆; traditional Chinese: 蔣慶; pinyin: Jiǎng Qìng; born 1953) is a contemporary Chinese Confucian. He is best known for his criticism of New Confucianism, which according to him, deviated from the original Confucian principles and is overly influenced by Western liberal democracy. He proposes an alternative path for China: Constitutional Confucianism, also known as Political Confucianism, or Institutional Confucianism, through the trilateral parliament framework.

He believes that China's ongoing political and social problems are to be solved by the revival of and commitment to authentic Confucianism in China. He also argues that Confucian materials should replace the Marxist curriculum taught in universities and government party schools.

== Biography ==
Jiang Qing was born on October 1, 1953, in Guiyang to a relatively affluent family. As a child, he had a passion for Chinese poetry and classical literature. The political situation at the time drove him to undertake studies of Marxism and human rights theories of the West during his university years. Later on, perplexed by China's political reality, he studied both eastern and western religion. Eventually, he studied New Confucianism, which on the one hand advocates the mind philosophy and self-cultivation, and on the other hand tries to fit Confucian ideologies into the framework of Western liberal democracy. Given his deep appreciation and knowledge of the classics, especially the Gongyang Zhuan commentary, and the Tiananmen Square protests of 1989, he was determined to find a solution for China's struggles. He believed that an embrace of Western ideas, especially democratic politics, liberty, and equality, is not suitable for China's development. This brought about his criticism of the New Confucianism, and his plan for China, which involved drawing on its own long-standing metaphysical moral and political values, as well as national identity, all of which are fundamentally different from Western ideologies. He also founded the Yangming Academy (zh:阳明精舍), a Confucian-based educational institution in 1996.

== Criticism of New Confucianism ==
Arguing that New Confucianism is exclusively concerned with the existential life of human individuals and their minds, Jiang calls it Mind Confucianism, perhaps to highlight how it focuses on individual moral development rather the Chinese institutional aspect that Gongyang Zhuan advocates, more specifically the idea of wangdao (王道 "kingly way; benevolent government"), loosely translated as "Way of the Humane Authority." Wangdao is a set of criteria for which a legitimate ruler meets. It consists mainly of three parts: transcendence (from heaven), history and culture (from earth) and the will (from human). These conditions essentially ensure an orderly society, in which the people dutifully obey their rightful ruler. In short, New Confucianism is not authentic for it incorrectly attempts to project Confucianism in terms of modern Western political institution of liberal democracy.

As such, Jiang claims that there are problems with New Confucianism. First, it places excessive emphasis on the ideas of individuality and self-cultivation, causing familial and social relations to collapse. In this respect, New Confucianism fails to recognize how traditional social institutions can help transform individuals into sages. Secondly, it excessively emphasizes the abstract metaphysical concepts. This makes New Confucians blind to practical social and political reality. Thirdly, New Confucians believe that through individuals' self-cultivation of virtue, external social and political problems will be solved. Because of this, they do not comprehend the critical role of ritual and legal systems in alleviating sociopolitical problems. Finally, under the assumption that the human mind exists outside of space and time New Confucianism resorts to transcendentalism. This lack of attention to history causes New Confucians to be unaware of the sociopolitical reality. Moreover, it betrays the Confucian spirit, for Confucius held that human beings exist at a point in historical and social reality; it is vital that they be defined by socio-political relationships according to the rites. Among other things, the fact that New Confucians predominantly draw on Mind Confucianism has made them oblivious to the values of Political Confucianism, a strand in which Jiang uses as the basis for his alternative solution. Moreover, Jiang believes New Confucians have inappropriately blended Western ideas of science and liberal democracy that are neither compatible with Confucianism, nor the Chinese society.

== Political Confucianism and rejection of western idea of 'equality' ==
Jiang has advocated the political Confucianism of the Gongyang School since the 1990s, and advocates for a "Confucian constitutional order".

Jiang coined the term "Political Confucianism", which as opposed to Mind Confucianism, concerns society and social relations. As it comes from the Han dynasty text Gongyang Zhuan, it reflects a version of Confucianism concerned with politics and governing. Also, whereas Mind Confucianism assumes that humans are innately good, Political Confucianism more cautiously employs institutional systems to condemn bad human behaviors and immoral politics, thereby nurturing individuals to become principled beings. Moreover, it pays attention to historical lessons and strives to find a rightful form of governance, as illustrated by the idea of wangdao. In deriving his solution, Jiang is hugely influenced by this concept. According to Jiang, political Confucianism is the crux of Confucianism and the moral virtue of benevolence is central to the Kingly Way of Confucian politics.

Jiang contends that democracies tend to destroy the environment and exploit other countries and that a Western-style democracy would not be suitable for China. According to Jiang, "democratic electorates give rise to imperialism, fascism, and hegemonism." Jiang is a leading proponent of the idea that China should discard the idea of democracy entirely and develop a "kingly way" of governance grounded in Confucian principles. According to his view, the kingly way cannot accept the Western idea of a universal suffrage that gives everyone the right to cast one vote regardless of their virtue or vice.

In Jiang's view, China's meritocratic traditions are more important for its political future than Western political concepts.Jiang rejects the Western concept of "equality," an idea that propagates liberal democracy. From the Confucian point of view, people are unequal—as they differ in virtue, intelligence, knowledge, ability, etc. Hence, it is not plausible to give everyone equal rights without considering their standings. Also, while every individual should be bounded by the law, this does not mean that everyone should have equal legal rights or obligations. In Jiang's view, parliamentary democracy is limited by legal formalism, vulgar populism, and moral relativism. Jiang proposes a tricameral legislature which would incorporate the will of heaven, earth, and human into a single sovereign body.

== Way of the Humane Authority ==
The Way of the Humane Authority as justification of political power is based on Confucian principles outlined in the Gongyang Zhuan, one the Three Commentaries on the Spring and Autumn Annals: the legitimacy of heaven (a sacred, transcendent sense of natural morality), the legitimacy of earth (wisdom from history and culture), and the legitimacy of the human (political obedience through popular will).

Wang contends that Confucianism should replace Marxism–Leninism as China's central ideology. Since 2004, Jiang has promoted the idea of replacing Marxism in textbooks with Confucianism.

=== The Trilateral Parliament as the solution ===
Jiang has proposed a trilateral parliament system for China, which would consist of three houses, each representing the three kinds of legitimacy discussed in Criticism of New Confucianism. "The three are the House of Exemplary Persons (Tongru Yuan), also called the House of Ru or the House of Confucian Tradition, which represents sacred legitimacy; the House of the People (Shumin Yuan), which represents popular legitimacy; and the House of the Nation (Guoti Yuan), which represents cultural legitimacy." The Confucian scholars in the House of Exemplary Persons are elected by recommendations and nominations. Representatives from Taoism, Buddhism, Islam, or even Christianity are also present in the House. The members in the House of People are elected by universal suffrage. The members in the House of Nation are chosen by hereditary criteria and by assignment. Each house possesses real parliamentary power, and a proposed bill must be accepted by at least two houses in order for it to become a law. In a way, this produces a system of checks and balances to guarantee that the best decision is reached, and that no party is overly dominant. All in all, the constitutional framework is supposed to endorse the Way of the Humane Authority. It has more dimensions of political legitimacy than liberal democracy, where only the people's will is reflected in the consent of the government.

== Reception of Jiang's ideology ==
Jiang's work has triggered debates in the academic circle. Some scholars, for example Ruichang Wang, agree with Jiang's criticism of liberal democracy and his proposal of the trilateral parliament regime. They believe that in the future, the idea will gain more support. Daniel A. Bell, another supporter of Jiang, agrees that in order for a political transition to become successful in the long run, it must draw on the existing cultural resources, i.e. Political Confucianism, in China's case. Similar to Wang, he believes that Jiang's proposal of the trilateral parliament system is promising, but there needs to be some modification for it to become feasible and more effective. The will of the people should not be the only parameter considered when making decisions. Yet, it is difficult to measure the effectiveness of the legitimacy from sacred sources or historical continuity.

Li Minghui wrote that while Jiang admittedly did significant work complicating New Confucianism by referencing political tradition, his conception of political Confucianism was theoretically and practically unsound. He accused Jiang of being overly concerned with the political and thus overlooking the mind and morality. In another essay regarding the questionable dichotomy drawn between Mainland Confucians and Hong Kong/Taiwan Confucians, Li charged Jiang with conflating the political exclusively with Mainland Confucianism when it was clear that Hong Kong and Taiwan were both also heavily concerned with political Confucianism. Li calls Jiang's conception of political Confucianism "utopian."

== Further reading and external links ==
- Bell, Daniel A., China's New Confucianism: Politics and Everyday Life in a Changing Society, Princeton University Press (2008)
- The Renaissance of Confucianism in Contemporary China, edited by Ruiping Fan, Springer (June 9, 2011), hardcover, 275 pages, ISBN 9400715412 ISBN 978-9400715417
- Stephen C. Angle, unpublished essay "Chinese Philosophers and Global Philosophy,"
- Jiang Qing, author; Daniel A. Bell, editor; Ruiping Fan, editor; and Edmund Ryden, translator, A Confucian Constitutional Order: How China's Ancient Past Can Shape Its Political Future, Princeton University Press (Princeton China) (October 28, 2012), hardcover, 266 pages, ISBN 0691154600 ISBN 978-0691154602
