= Gongyang Gao =

Writer of the Gongyang Zhuan

Gongyang Gao 公羊高
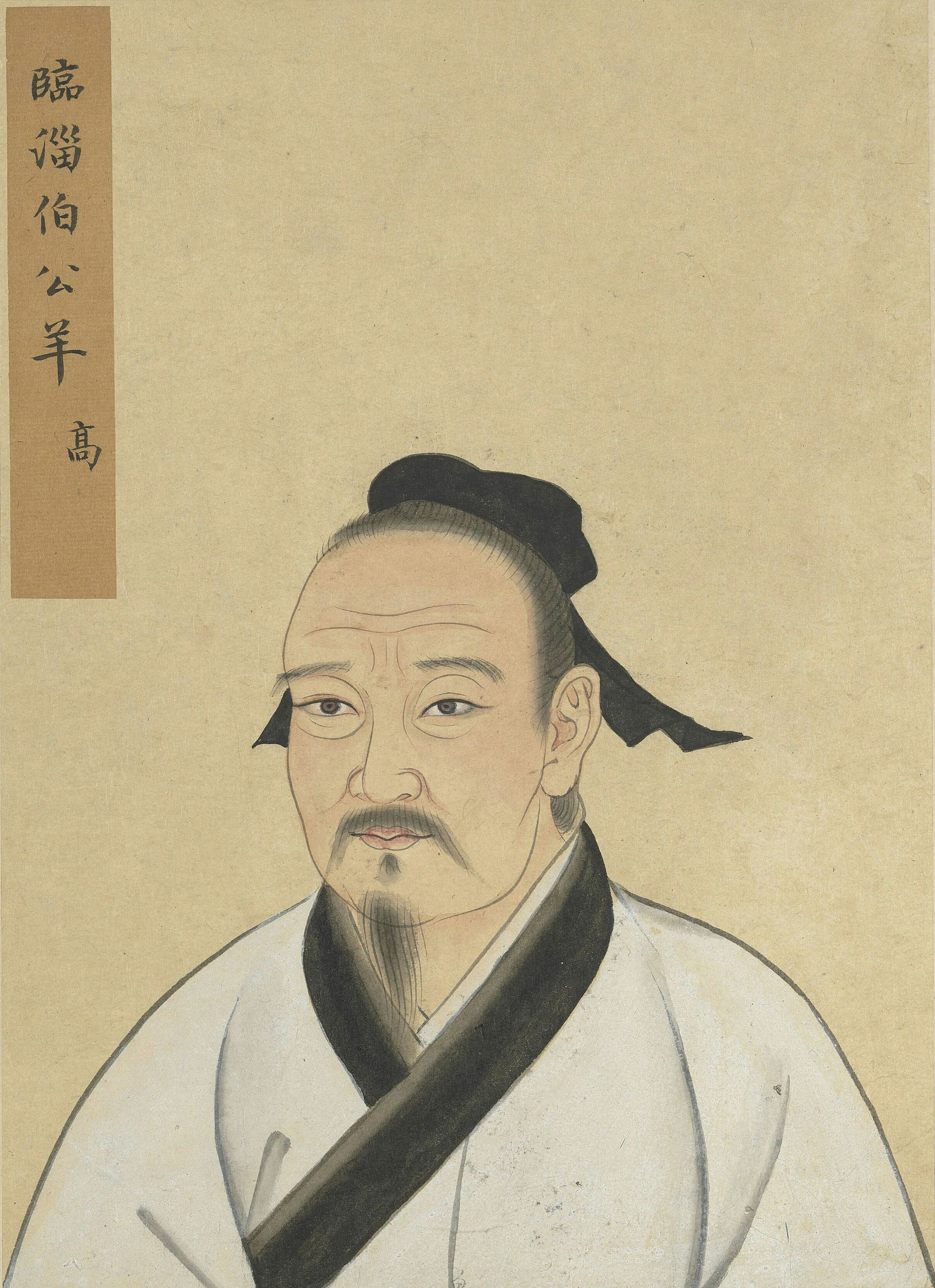
- Yuan dynasty portrait.
- Born: State of Qi
- Occupations: Philosopher; Educator

Academic background
- Influences: Bu Shang

Academic work
- School or tradition: Confucianism
- Main interests: Spring and Autumn Annals
- Notable works: Gongyang Zhuan
- Influenced: Dong Zhongshu; Hu Wusheng (Note: 胡毋生, also written as 胡母子); Gongyang Ping

Gongyang Gao
- Chinese: 公羊高
Transcriptions
Standard Mandarin
- Hanyu Pinyin: gōng yáng gāo
- Bopomofo: ㄍㄨㄥ ㄧㄤˊ ㄍㄠ
- Wade–Giles: kung^{1}yang^{2} kao^{1}
Wu
- Romanization: kon^{1}yan^{6} kau^{1}
Yue: Cantonese
- Jyutping: gung^{1} joeng^{4} gou^{1}
Middle Chinese
- Middle Chinese: kuwngyang kaw
Old Chinese
- Baxter–Sagart (2014): /*C.qˤoŋɢaŋ Cə.[k]ˤaw/
- Zhengzhang: /*kloːŋlaŋ kaːw/

Gongyang Gao (公羊高) was an educator and philosopher of the State of Qi and a disciple of Confucius and Bu Shang. He orally received the Spring and Autumn Annals from Bu Shang and transmitted it to his son, Gongyang Ping (公羊平), and it was from this transmission that the Gongyang Zhuan would be produced.

== Influence ==
Gongyang's work would be extensively studied, but was held in lesser esteem to Guliang Chi's Guliang Zhuan following Dong Zhongshu (董仲舒) losing a debate in front of Emperor Xuan of Han to Duke Jiang of Xiaqu, who studied Guliang's work. Another individual, Cai Qianqiu, did the same, and was promoted. Despite this, Gongyang's work persisted and was crystallised as one of the Three Commentaries, along with the Zuo Zhuan and Guliang Zhuan.
