= Hihara Toshikuni =

Japanese scholar of Chinese intellectual history

Toshikuni Hihara
- 日原 利国
- Born: 1927; Yamanashi Prefecture, Japan
- Died: 1984 (aged 56–57)

Academic background
- Education: Doctor of Literature

Academic work
- Discipline: Chinese intellectual history
- Institutions: Kyoto University

Toshikuni Hihara (Japanese: 日原 利国; 1927–1984) was a Japanese sinologist and historian. He was born in Yamanashi Prefecture and served as a professor at the Faculty of Letters, Kyoto University. He specialized in the history of Chinese thought and held a Doctor of Literature degree.

He was the editor of the Chūgoku Shisō Jiten (中国思想辞典, Dictionary of Chinese Thought; 1984) of which a second edition was published after his death, revised by Usami Kazuhiro.

== Works ==
Authored and translated books (in selection):

- Shunjū Kōyōden no Kenkyū (春秋公羊伝の研究, Studies on the Spring and Autumn Annals with the Gongyang Commentary), Sōbunsha.
- Kandai Shisō no Kenkyū (漢代思想の研究, Studies of Han Dynasty Thought), Kenbun Shuppan.
- Shunjū Hanro (春秋繁露; Chunqiu Fanlu), Meitoku Shuppansha.
- Mōshi (孟子, Mencius), Japanese translation (co-translator), Chikuma Shobō.
- Junshi (荀子, Xunzi), Japanese translation (co-translator), Heibonsha.
- Zoku Shodan (続書断; Chinese: Xu Shuduan 續書斷), Nigensha.
- Senwa Shofu (宣和書譜; Chinese: Xuanhe Shupu), Nigensha.
- Meiritsu Kokuji Kai (明律国字解, The Ming Dynasty Legal Code Explained in Japanese), Sōbunsha.
- (Editor) Chūgoku Shisōshi (中国思想史, History of Chinese Thought), Vols. 1–2, Tokyo: Perikansha 1987

== Bibliography ==
- Chūgoku Shisō Jiten (中国思想辞典, Dictionary of Chinese Thought). Edited by Toshikuni Hihara. Kenbun Shuppan, 1984. ISBN 487636043X (with a short biography)
