= Pavilion of Harmony =

Infinity edge pool in Hong Kong

Coordinates: 22°25′17″N 114°12′36″E

- 合一亭
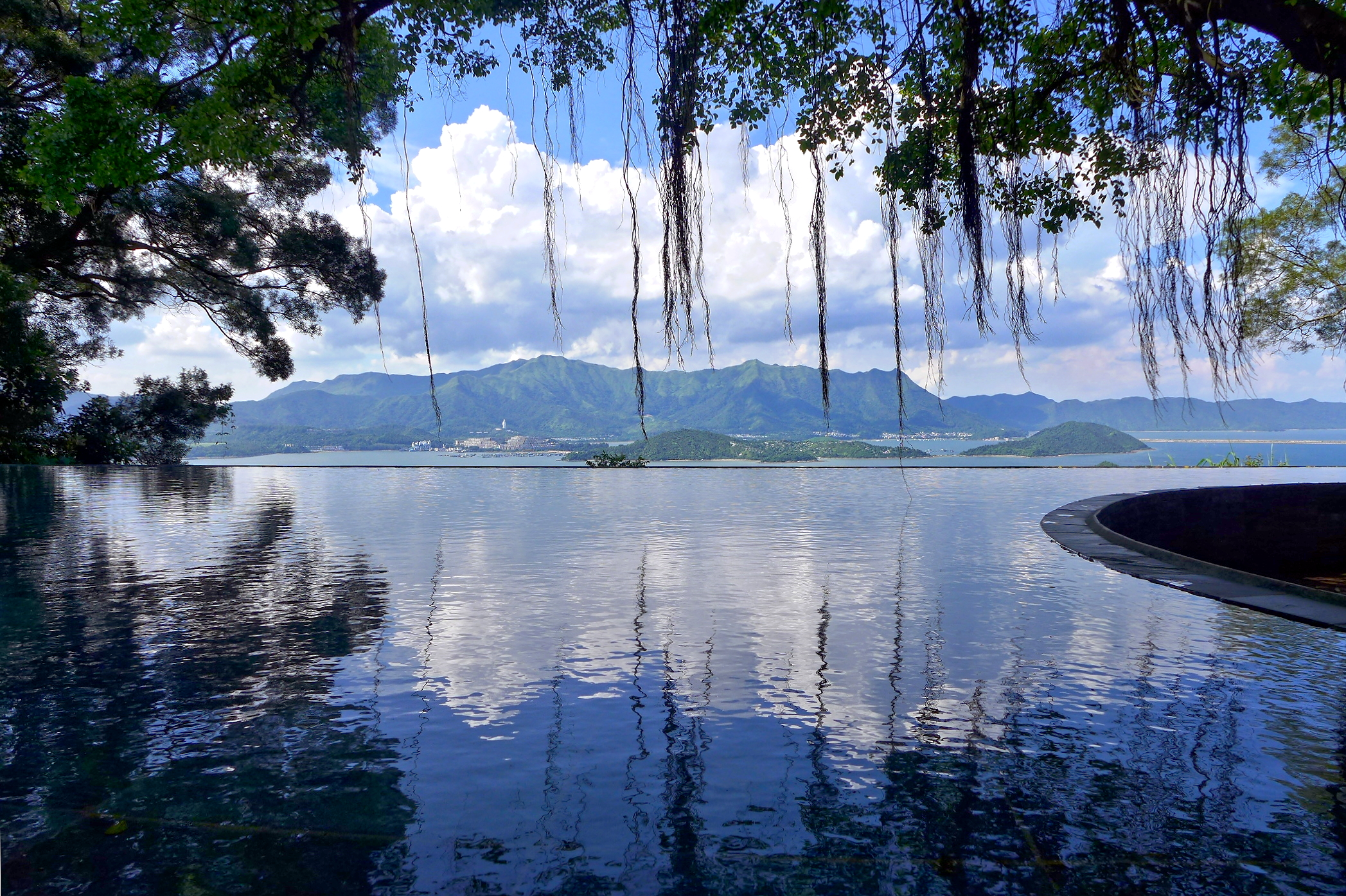
- View of the pond in front of the pavilion

General information
- Location: New Asia College, The Chinese University of Hong Kong, Sha Tin, Hong Kong
- Opened: 12 December 2003; 21 years ago

Design and construction
- Architect(s): Freeman Chan Wai-kei

The Pavilion of Harmony (Chinese: 合一亭) is an architectural feature on the New Asia College campus of The Chinese University of Hong Kong (CUHK), located between the student dormitories Xuesi Hall and Chih Hsing Hall. It was constructed as a tribute to the founder of New Asia College, Chien Mu, and his 1996 philosophical work, The Theory of the Union of Man and Nature.

The pavilion was officially opened on 12 December 2003. It was donated by Dora Ng Tsung-lin, and designed by Freeman Chan Wai-kei from the CUHK Department of Architecture.

The pavilion is featured on lists of Hong Kong's top Instagram spots and attracts many photo-takers, including tourists from mainland China, leading to complaints of disturbance from students living nearby.

== Architecture ==
The unity of Heaven and humanity is a central concept in Confucian philosophy, which holds that the way of heaven and the way of humanity are interconnected.

The location of the Pavilion of Harmony is thoughtfully chosen, as described by former head of New Asia College, Henry Wong Nai-ching, as "one clear pool, two trees half-embracing, not a traditional garden, but with modern artistic intent" (一池清水，二樹半抱，非傳統園林，有現代筆意).

The pavilion features a glass canopy and has bamboo trees planted on the side. Under the pavilion is a stone bench overlooking Tolo Harbour. In front of the pavilion sits a crescent-shaped infinity pool with a large banyan tree planted next to it. The edge of the pool appears to merge with the landscape of Tolo Harbour, creating the effect of unity between water and sky, thus enhancing the concept of unity between heaven and humanity.

The pavilion is connected to a walkway that has a long metal plaque. Engraved on the plaque is calligraphy of Chien Mu's The Theory of the Union of Man and Nature and the Seal of the Union of Man and Nature, created respectively by Lee Wun-yoon and Vincent Tong Kam-tang, professors from the CUHK Department of Fine Arts.
