= Shuo Yuan =

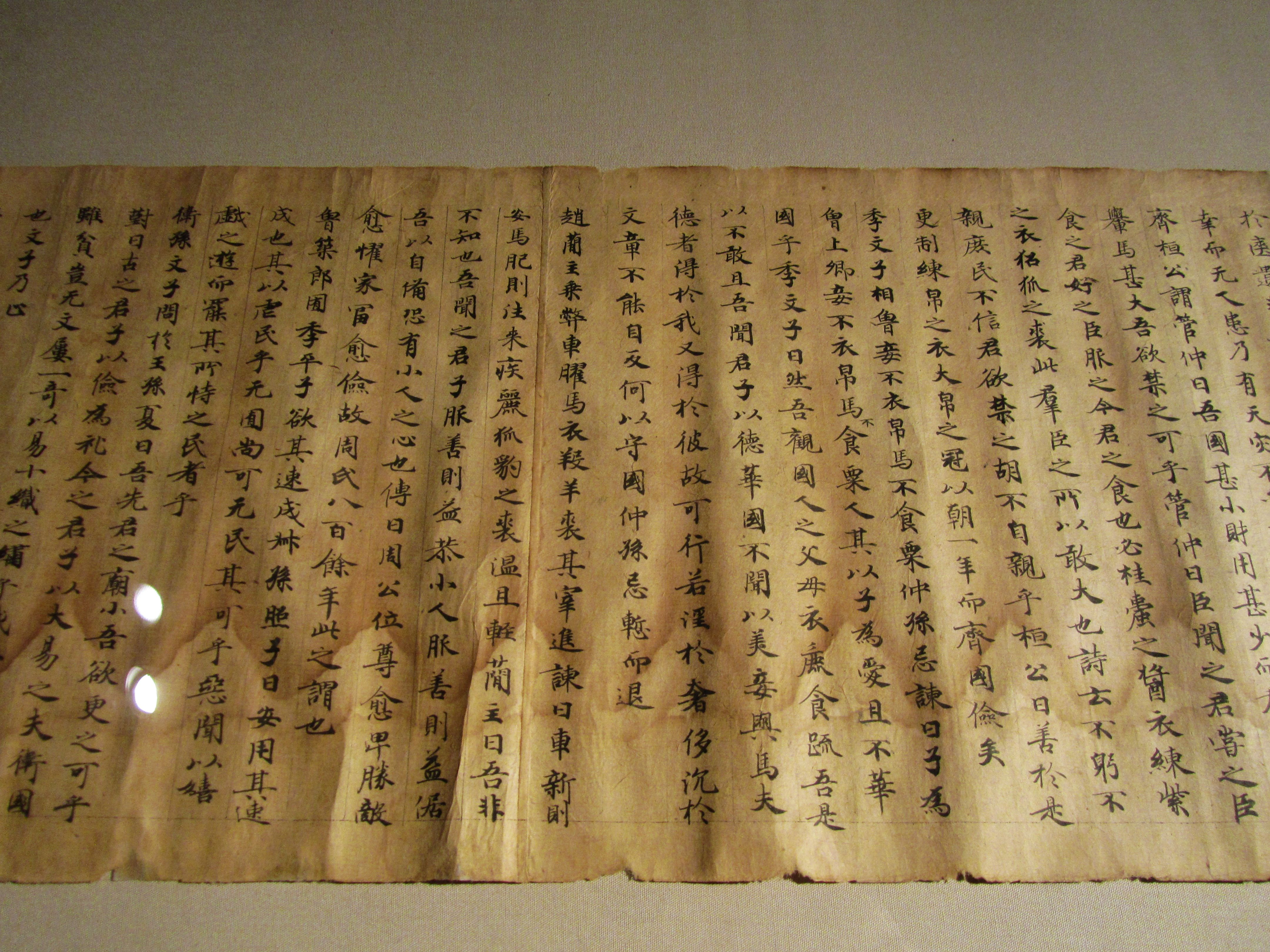
- Tang dynasty scroll copy found in Dunhuang

Chinese name
- Traditional Chinese: 說苑
- Simplified Chinese: 说苑
Transcriptions
Standard Mandarin
- Hanyu Pinyin: Shuō Yuàn
- Wade–Giles: Shuo Yüan
Yue: Cantonese
- Jyutping: Syut3 Jyun2
Southern Min
- Hokkien POJ: Soat-oán
- Tâi-lô: Suat-uán

Korean name
- Hangul: 설원
- Hanja: 說苑
Transcriptions
- Revised Romanization: Seorwon
- McCune–Reischauer: Sŏrwŏn

The Shuo Yuan (Chinese: 說苑; Jyutping: Syut3 Jyun2; Pe̍h-ōe-jī: Soat-oán), variously translated as Garden of Stories, Garden of Persuasions, Garden of Talks, Garden of Eloquence, etc., is a collection of stories and anecdotes from the pre-Qin period (先秦) to the Western Han dynasty. The stories were compiled and annotated by the imperial librarian Liu Xiang (died 6 BCE). In many cases, multiple versions of the same story are included, making the book a valuable source for the study of early texts.

== See also ==
- Xinxu
- Han shi waizhuan
- Song of the Yue Boatman

== Translation ==
- Henry, Eric (2022). Garden of Eloquence / Shuoyuan 說苑. University of Washington Press. ISBN 9780295995199.
