= Bu Shang =

5th-century BC prominent disciple of Confucius

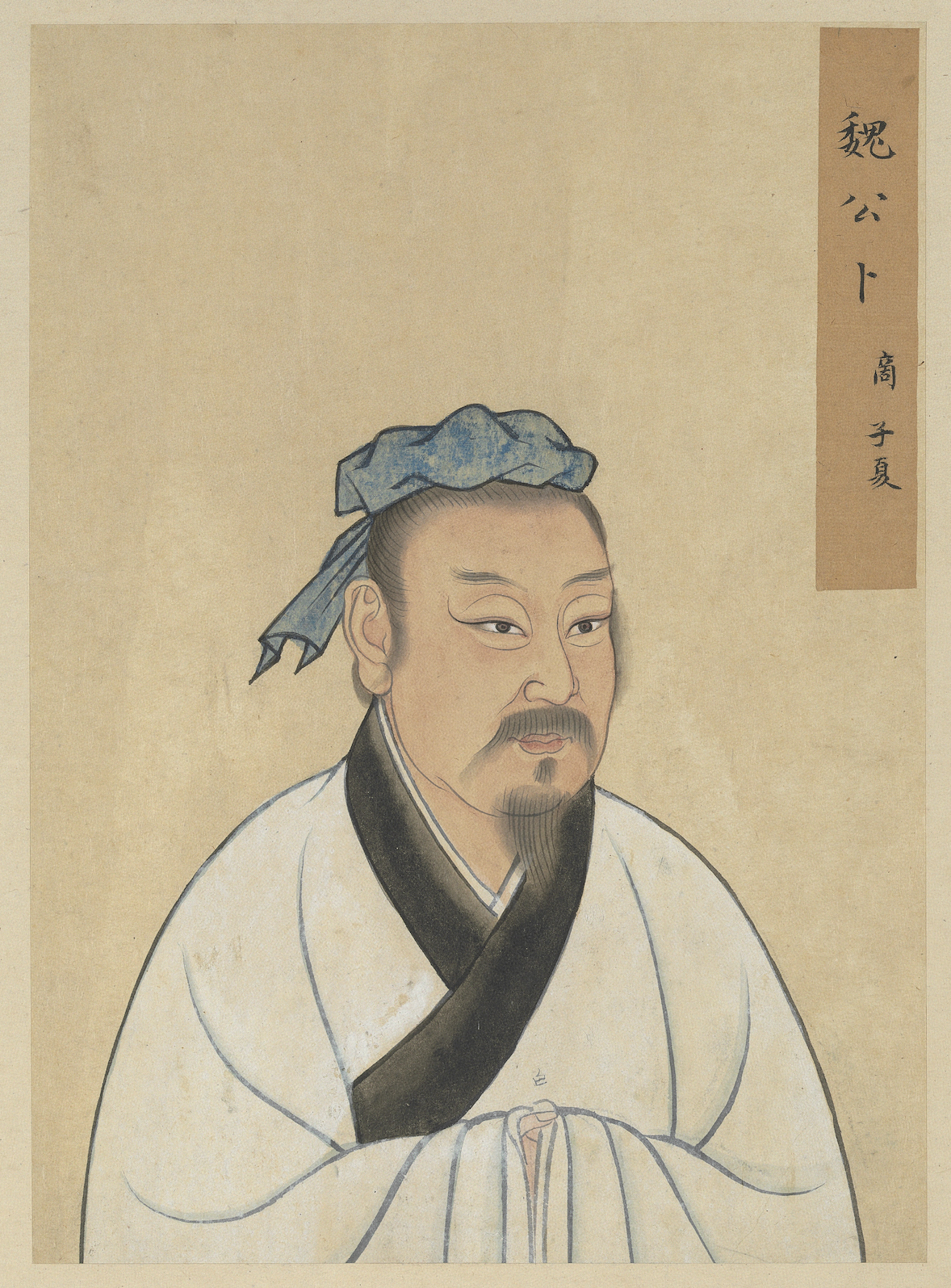
- Bu Shang in the Half-Portraits of the Great Sage and Virtuous Men of Old (至聖先賢半身像), housed in the National Palace Museum
- Chinese: 卜商
Transcriptions
Standard Mandarin
- Hanyu Pinyin: Bǔ Shāng
- Wade–Giles: Pu Shang
Southern Min
- Hokkien POJ: Pok Siong

Other names

Courtesy name Zixia
- Chinese: 子夏
Transcriptions
Standard Mandarin
- Hanyu Pinyin: Zǐxià
- Wade–Giles: Tzu-hsia
Southern Min
- Hokkien POJ: Chú-hā

Buzi
- Chinese: 卜子
- Literal meaning: Master Bu
Transcriptions
Standard Mandarin
- Hanyu Pinyin: Bǔzǐ
- Wade–Giles: Pu-tzu
Southern Min
- Hokkien POJ: Pok-chú

Bu Shang (507 BC – 400 BC), commonly known by his courtesy name Zixia or as Buzi (Master Bu), was an ancient Chinese philosopher and a prominent disciple of Confucius who was considered one of the most accomplished in cultural learning. He was one of the five disciples who took chief responsibility for the transmission of Confucius' teachings. He played a significant role in the transmission of such classics as the Book of Poetry and the I Ching. He established his own school, and taught Marquess Wen of Wei, ruler of Wei, the most powerful state of the early Warring States period.

== Students ==
Said to be a teacher of early "Legalist" Li Kui, Bu Shang is cited for the principle of favoring talents over favoritism.

== Life ==
=== Disciple of Confucius ===
It is uncertain which state Bu Shang came from. Different ancient sources name his birthplace variously as either Wey, Wei, or Wen (溫). Modern scholars, including Ch'ien Mu, generally believe he was from Wei. Born in 507 BC, he was 44 years younger than Confucius.

The most frequently mentioned characteristic of Bu Shang is his love of book learning, and he was well versed in the Classics. He recommended broad, committed learning, and more than a millennium after his lifetime, his phrase, "Reflect on things near at hand" (jinsi) was used as the title of one of the most important works of Neo-Confucianism, by Zhu Xi. However, he had a "tendency toward pedantry", and sometimes treated learning as "an end unto itself". While lavishing praise on him for cultural learning, Confucius mildly criticized Bu Shang for his pedantry, reminding him of the greater ultimate importance of virtuous action over learning.

The Analects and the Book of Rites record a number of Bu Shang's sayings, one of the best known being, "Life and death are a matter of Destiny; wealth and honor depend on Heaven".

=== Later life ===
Bu Shang, along with Yan Yan, Zeng Shen, You Ruo, Zhuansun Shi, and Tantai Mieming, was among the disciples of Confucius who continued teaching after the death of their Master. Bu Shang established a school at Xihe (west of the Yellow River) in the State of Wei, where he taught numerous students, including Marquess Wen of Wei (r. 445–396 BC), the ruler of the state. His other influential students included Tian Zifang (田子方), Zhai Huang (翟璜), Duangan Mu (段干木), and Wei Cheng (魏成), all high-ranking ministers of Wei.

According to tradition, Gongyang Gao and Guliang Chi, authors of the Gongyang Zhuan and the Guliang Zhuan respectively, two of the Three Commentaries on the Spring and Autumn Annals, both studied the Spring and Autumn Annals under Bu Shang.

Bu Shang lived a long life. When his son predeceased him, he wept inconsolably and became blind.

== Legacy ==
In Confucian temples, Bu Shang's spirit tablet is placed fifth among the Twelve Wise Ones, on the east.

During the Tang dynasty, Emperor Xuanzong posthumously awarded Bu Shang the nobility title of Marquess of Wei (魏侯). During the Song dynasty, he was further awarded the titles of Duke of Hedong (河東公) and Duke of Wei (魏公).

Bu Shang's offspring held the title of Wujing Boshi (五經博士; Wǔjīng Bóshì).
