= Zhang Rong (poet) =

Chinese official and poet

Zhang Rong (simplified Chinese: 张融; traditional Chinese: 張融; pinyin: Zhāng Róng; Wade–Giles: Chang Jung; 443–497), courtesy name Siguang (思光), was a Chinese official and poet during the period of the Northern and Southern Dynasties.

A native of Jiangsu, he entered upon official life as secretary to the Prince of Xin'an. When the Emperor Xiaowu of Liu Song was building a shrine to the memory of his favourite concubine, the Prince's mother, Zhang would only subscribe a hundred cash. This caused the Emperor to say sarcastically that he must be provided with some well-paid post, and to send him to Fengxi (封溪) in Annam. Zhang declared at starting that he had no fear as to returning; his only fear was that he might be sent back again. On the road, he fell into the hands of bandits; but when they were about to cut his head off, they found him quietly reciting a poem, at which they were so astonished that they let him go. He managed to reach Huế after a long passage, during which he composed a famous poem, called Song of the Sea (海賦), admitted by Xu Kaizhi (徐凱之) to be superior to his own work under the same title. On his return, he was raised to high office, and was subsequently a great favourite with the Emperor Gao of Southern Qi, who said that he could not do without one such man, nor with two. In spite of his exalted rank he dressed so poorly that on one occasion his Majesty sent him an old suit of clothes, with a message that a tailor had been instructed to take his measure for a new one. The Taoist priest Lu Xiujing (陸修靜) also gave him a fan made of white egret feathers, saying that strange things should be given to strange people.
