= Gongyang Zhuan =

Commentary on the Spring and Autumn Annals

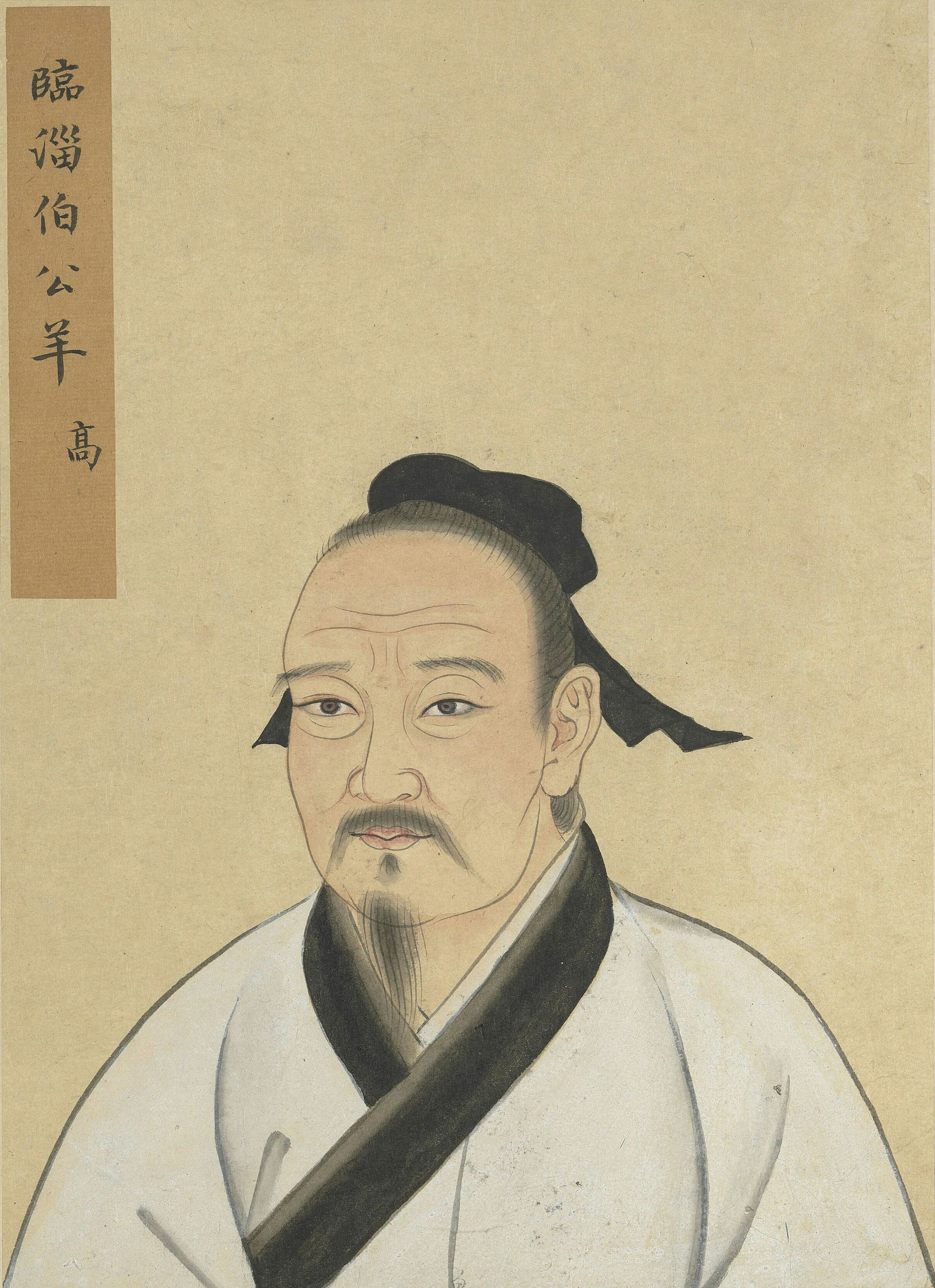
- Yuan dynasty portrait of Gongyang Gao, the author.

Chinese name
- Traditional Chinese: 公羊傳
- Simplified Chinese: 公羊传
- Literal meaning: Gongyang's Commentaries
Transcriptions
Standard Mandarin
- Hanyu Pinyin: Gōngyáng zhuàn
- Wade–Giles: Kung^{1}-yang^{2} Chʻuan^{2}
- IPA: [kʊ́ŋjǎŋ ʈʂwân]
Yue: Cantonese
- Jyutping: gung1 joeng4 zyun6
Middle Chinese
- Middle Chinese: /kuŋ jɨɐŋ ɖˠiuᴇn/
Old Chinese
- Zhengzhang: /*kloːŋ laŋ don/

Vietnamese name
- Vietnamese alphabet: Xuân Thu Công Dương truyện
- Chữ Hán: 春秋公羊傳

Korean name
- Hangul: 춘추공양전
- Hanja: 春秋公羊傳
Transcriptions
- Revised Romanization: Chunchugongyangjeon

Japanese name
- Kanji: 春秋公羊伝
- Kana: しゅんじゅうくようでん
Transcriptions
- Romanization: Shinjū Kuyouden

The Gongyang Zhuan, also known as the Gongyang Commentary on the Spring and Autumn Annals or the Commentary of Gongyang, is a commentary on the Spring and Autumn Annals written by Gongyang Gao, and is thus one of the Chinese classics. Along with the Zuo Zhuan and the Guliang Zhuan, the work is one of the Three Commentaries on the Spring and Autumn Annals. In particular, Gongyang Zhuan is a central work to New Text Confucianism (今文經學), which advocates Confucius as an institutional reformer instead of a respected scholar, and Chunqiu as an embodiment of Confucius' holistic vision on political, social, and moral issues instead of a merely chronicle. Gongyang Zhuan significantly influenced the political institution in Han dynasty. It fell out of favor among elites and was eventually replaced by the Zuo Zhuan. Gongyang Zhuan scholarship was reinvigorated in late Ming dynasty and became a major source of inspiration for Chinese reformers from the eighteenth to early twentieth century.

Sima Qian states that Mencius, Gongsun Gu, Xunzi and Han Fei often drew on the Gongyang, while actually they drew on commentaries similar to what we now call the Zuozhuan; for him the distinction was meaningless.

== Content ==
A Qing dynasty printed copy of the Gongyang Zhuan

Pages from a late Ming printed edition of the Gongyang Zhuan

The work covers the period between Duke Yin of Lu and Duke Ai of Lu. Gongyang Zhuan argues that the Spring and Autumn Annals is not merely a history, but a magnum opus of Confucius' ideas regarding sociopolitical order. Unlike Zuo Zhuan, a later favorite among many scholars for its vivid narrative of historical events, Gongyang Zhuan was compiled in a dialogistic style resembling a class conversation between a Confucian scholar and his student discussing the profound meanings behind the subtle words of the Spring and Autumn Annals and was brief in explaining the historical context. Because of its emphasis on the theoretical interpretation of the Annals, Jiang Qing (b. 1953) dubbed it "the political theory wing of Confucianism (政治儒學)."

The primary assumption of Gongyang Zhuan is that Confucius authored the Spring and Autumn Annals in order to criticize the politics of his time and set a constitutional guideline for future generations. Moreover, Confucius is not merely a transmitter of ancient scholarship but a charismatic sage (聖) who should have received the Mandate of Heaven and become a King himself. But since Confucius did not receive the kingship due to the political circumstances at the time, he compiled the Spring and Autumn Annals based on official chronicles, in which he criticized (褒貶) the events and historical figures of the Spring and Autumn period according to a coherent philosophy. Based on this assumption, Gongyang Zhuan strives to undercover what it claims to be the deeper meaning behind layers of subtle texts.

Gongyang Zhuan's interpretation of the Spring and Autumn Annals is more voluntarism than that advocated by the Old Texts scholars.

=== Dong Zhongshu's interpretation ===
Dong Zhongshu was a leading Confucian scholar in the Western Han dynasty, and was regarded as an authority on Gongyang Zhuan. Dong advocated According to Qing dynasty scholar Kang Youwei's summary, some of Gongyang Zhuan's political agenda including the establishment of a well-ordered hierarchical regime (明尊卑之分), a strong and centralized political authority (強幹弱枝), and a merit-based civil government (論賢才之義，別所長之能), and a benevolent ruler whose legitimacy is based on the Mandate of Heaven.

=== Jiang Qing's reading ===
According to contemporary scholar Jiang Qing's Introductory Treatise on Gongyang Scholarship (公羊學引論), Gongyang Zhuan includes the following themes:

- Three Stages of Human History (張三世).

Gongyang Zhuan' argues that human society evolves over time and could be divided into three phases. The first stage (據亂世) is marked by political chaos and social anomy, the second stage (昇平世) is characterized by the reestablishment of legitimate political order, and the third stage (太平世) is when the world as a whole experiences great harmony and every individual is able to fully realize their potential.

- Unity of cosmological and political order (大一統)
- Reconciliation between past and present sources of political legitimacy (通三統)
- Limitation on monarchical power (天子一爵)
- Distinction between legitimate political maneuver and realpolitik (經權說)
- Interaction between human and heaven (天人感應)
- Distinction between Chinese and non-Chinese cultures ((夷夏之辨)
- Just retribution (大復仇)

== Early development ==
The genealogy of Gongyang Zhuan has been a contested issue among scholars. According to the Book of Han, Bu Shang (Zixia), one of the top disciples of Confucius, taught Confucius' class notes to his disciple Gongyang Gao of the State of Qi during the Warring States period (475–221 BCE). An oral commentary at first, it was written down and edited during the early Han dynasty by Gongyang Gao's decedent Gongyang Shou (公羊壽) and his collaborator Humu Sheng (胡母生).

Humu Sheng later became a boshi ("erudite") in the Han court in charge of the studying and teaching of Gongyang Zhuan. Along with him was another Gongyang Zhuan authority Dong Zhongshu. With Emperor Wu of Han's adoption of Dong's proposal to formally establish Confucianism as the state ideology, the power and influence of the Gongyang School increased significantly. Later, Dong Zhongshu authored Luxuriant Dew of the Spring and Autumn Annals, Interactions Between Heaven and Mankind and Strange Calamities of Yin and Yang, in which he popularized his mysticism interpretation of Gongyang Zhuan. Along with the widespread adoption of divination practices, the Han intelligentsia became shrouded in an atmosphere of superstition and mystery. Nonetheless, among officials, Gongyang School was seen as a vital political classic that provided ideological basis and historical precedents in governing, and was cited during policy debates.

Dong Zhongshu's two students, Yan Pengzu and Yan Anle (顏安樂) became the leaders of Gongyang School after Dong's death.

Some exegesis monographs by Gongyang scholars mounts to over one million characters in length, that scholars from other schools accused Gongyang school for being too fixated on the trivia of Chunqiu.

At the end of Western Han dynasty, scholar Liu Xin proposed to establish professorship for Zuo Zhuan and Guliang Zhuan. Once his advice was adopted, Gongyang school no longer monopolized the official interpretation of Spring and Autumn Annals. From the time of the Eastern Han dynasty onwards, more and more people criticized Dong Zhongshu's interpretation of the Gongyang Zhuan.

During the later years of the Han dynasty, He Xiu became the most ardent defender of Gongyang School. He combated vigorously with scholars who prefer Zuo Zhuan and Guliang Zhuan. After spending seventeen years, he wrote a hermeneutics work on Gongyang Zhuan, which is largely survived into modern days. He Xiu's work became the primary source for textual reconstruction of Gongyang Zhuan and a major source of inspiration for later Gongyang scholars.

Huan Kuan (桓寬), author of the Confucian political treatise Discourses on Salt and Iron, was another notable Gongyang Scholar.

== Commentaries ==
In his Confucian work Discourse on the Six Arts (六藝論), the Han scholar Zheng Xuan makes the following comment:

The Zuo Zhuan is best with regards to Confucian rites, the Gongyang Zhuan for divination and the Guliang Zhuan for the classical view of Confucianism.

The Eastern Jin dynasty scholar Fan Ning (grandfather of Fan Ye, author of the Book of the Later Han), in his commentary on works relating to the Guliang's Commentary on Spring and Autumn Annals said that the Zuo Zhuan was colorful and rich in content but contains too much wizardry, the Guliang Zhuan was clear and elegantly written but too short whilst the Gongyang Zhuan seemed argumentative, judgmental and vulgar in style. In the opinion of the Han scholar and official He Xiu (Han dynasty), the Gongyang Zhuan's achievement is its appraisal of the Spring and Autumn Annals to expound the "great way of Confucianism" through the use of subtle and profound language.

== Later development ==
In the period between the Eastern Wu and the end of the Southern and Northern dynasties (229-589 CE), the official He Xiu School was established.

During the Tang dynasty, study of the Gongyang Zhuan gradually declined with very few academics concentrating on the work.

Gongyang scholarship was introduced to Japan. Notable scholars include Hayashi Razan and his son Hayashi Gahō. Hayashi Gahō later published a commentated version of Gongyang Zhuan in 1688, attributing the comments to his father.

During the Qing dynasty the study of textual criticism flourished with successive scholars researching the Gongyang Zhuan and reinvigorating its ideas. This re-evaluation of the work was probably a response to the massive social and political changes of the period which caused scholars to reassess the dominant official interpretation of Confucianism.

Gongyang Zhuan played an important role in the works of the Changzhou School of Thought proponents. The school held an important position during the late Qing dynasty as a mainstream center of learning with scholars such as Kong Guangsen, Zhuang Cunyu, Liu Fenglu, Gong Zizhen, Wei Yuan and Kang Youwei amongst others. The school's main target for criticism was the Old Texts. In particular, Kang Youwei's interpretation helped facilitated the widespread doubt on the Old Texts among intellectuals, and thus creating a sympathetic audience for his reformist ideas, which later became well known in Hundred Days' Reform.

In 1995, Chinese scholar Jiang Qing published his work Introductory Treatise on Gongyang Scholarship, which marked the revived interest in the Gongyang Zhuan among modern political theorists.
