= Interactions Between Heaven and Mankind =

Concept for choosing a monarch

Interactions between Heaven and Mankind (simplified Chinese: 天人感应; traditional Chinese: 天人感應; pinyin: Tiān-rén gǎnyìng) is a set of doctrines formulated by Chinese Han dynasty scholar Dong Zhongshu which at that time became the basis for deciding the legitimacy of a monarch. At the same time, for the Confucian School of Thought, Interactions between Heaven and Mankind provided a set of checks and balances on a reigning monarch. This ganying in the title is a Chinese cultural keyword meaning "correlative resonance; stimulus and response; moral retribution".

== History ==
Interactions Between Heaven and Mankind is said to originate from The Great Plan [of Jizi], the 24th Scroll of the Book of Documents. Dong Zhongshu based his doctrines on this theoretical framework, believing that heaven (天) had its own consciousness and controlled everything through the "100 Lords of Heaven" with all natural laws and variations in human affairs decided by them. Moreover, he believed that human physiological structure, thought, emotions and moral character are all modelled according to heaven's will and thus that humankind is the incarnation of heaven.

Furthermore, Dong Zhongshu believed that a monarch was ordained by heaven as its representative. Auspicious heaven honoured the ruler; calamitous heaven condemned his thinking with all calamity caused by political errors. If a calamity such as an earthquake or prolonged drought occurred, the Emperor was obliged to issue an edict of self-criticism (罪己诏; 罪己詔) admitting his lack of ability and virtue, leave the royal palace, enter a period of fasting, profess his guilt or pardon some prisoners. This edict should be frank and not hide anything so as to make up for the error. Statistics compiled by the Chinese academic Xiao Han (蕭瀚) show that from the time of the fifteenth Han emperor onwards edicts of self-criticism were issued 8 times by Emperor Xuan, 13 times by Emperor Yuan and 12 times by Emperor Cheng.

Xiao Han's research on the Twenty-Four Dynastic Histories shows that in total 79 edicts of self-criticism were issued. For example, in June 221 CE during the Three Kingdoms period an eclipse occurred and Cao Pi, first emperor of Cao Wei, issued an edict of self-criticism. In 1213 CE, Emperor Ningzong of Song issued an edict of self-criticism during thunderstorms that occurred in September. During Emperor Zhangzong of Jin's reign during a widespread drought in 1190 CE, he commanded the people to pray for rain and the prime minister and senior officials to show their guilt. The emperor further asked Hanlin Academy Dang Huaiying (党怀英) to draft a suitable edict of self-criticism for him. During a critical period in the final years of the Northern Song dynasty (960 – 1127 CE), when Jin or Jurchen troops were at the wall of his capital, Emperor Huizong also issued an edict of self-criticism:

Words conceal the roadway pass, flatter the sun's reputation, flatter lucky autocracy and allow corrupt officials to enjoy success. Taxation exhausts the wealth of the people and saps the strength of garrisoned troops. Much is done in a wasteful manner which is not beneficial.

Chinese academic Hu Shih believed that the doctrine of Interactions Between Heaven and Earth was the origin of the ideas of Mohism.

== See also ==
- Unity of Heaven and humanity
