= Chunqiu shiyu =

Early Chinese text written on silk

Chunqiu shiyu (Chinese: 春秋事語; pinyin: Chūnqiū Shìyǔ) is an early Chinese text written on silk which was unearthed in 1973 from the Tomb no. 3 (dated 168 BCE) at the Mawangdui Han tombs site in Changsha, Hunan, China. The tomb was that of a young man, presumed to be a relative and perhaps the son of Lì Cāng (利蒼), who was the chancellor of the Kingdom of Changsha and first Marquis of Dài (軚).

The manuscript was unearthed in 1973 along with a large number of other documents on silk and bamboo slips, including the Yijing and Laozi, as well as military, medical, and astronomical manuscripts. Chūnqiū shìyǔ records historical events from the Spring and Autumn period and partially preserves over 2000 characters.

The first half of the name of the document refers to the period covered, Chūnqiū 春秋, meaning Spring and Autumn, while the second half of the title, shìyǔ (事语), is a historiographer's narrative, one type of the ‘yǔ’ (語) narrative genre of the period.

The calligraphy of the document is similar to that on some bamboo books, a form transitional between the Qin seal script of the Eastern Zhou and Qin dynasty periods, and the clerical script of the Han dynasty. This, plus the fact that it does not treat as taboo the name of the Han dynasty founder Liu Bang, means that it was probably produced around the mid to late 3rd century BCE, before Liu took the throne in 202 BCE.
