= Dong Zhongshu =

Chinese philosopher (179–104 BC)

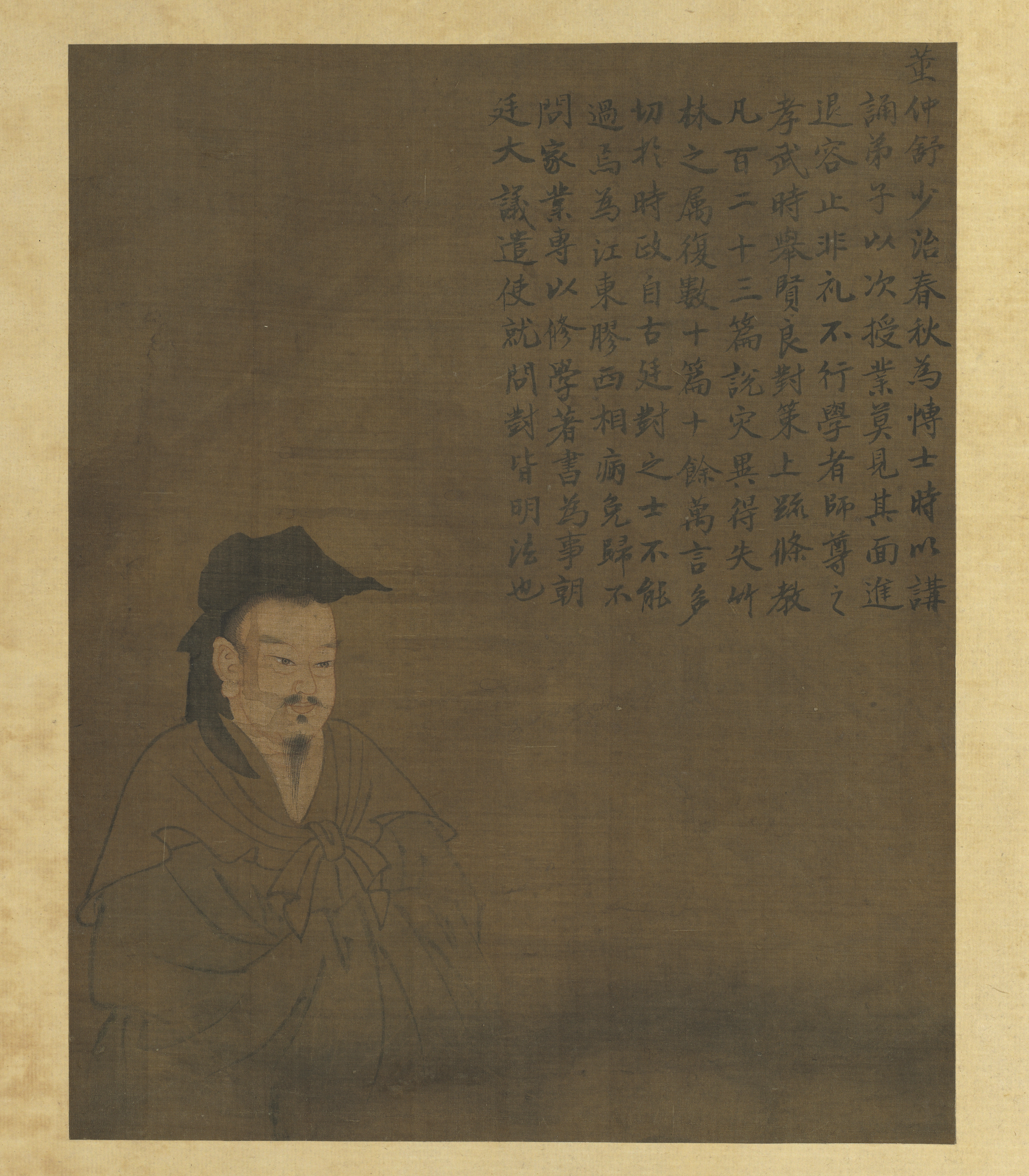
- Portrait of Dong Zhongshu (National Palace Museum)
- Chinese: 董仲舒
Transcriptions
Standard Mandarin
- Hanyu Pinyin: Dǒng Zhòngshū
- Wade–Giles: Tung^{3} Chung^{4}-shu^{1}
- IPA: [tʊ̀ŋ ʈʂʊ̂ŋ.ʂú]
Yue: Cantonese
- Yale Romanization: Dúng Jùhng-syū
- Jyutping: Dung^{2} Zung^{4}-syu^{1}
- IPA: [tʊŋ˧˥ tsʊŋ˩.sy˥]
Southern Min
- Hokkien POJ: Táng Tiōng-soo
Middle Chinese
- Middle Chinese: Túng ɖjùwng-sho
Old Chinese
- Baxter–Sagart (2014): Tˤongʔ N-trung-s l̥a

Dong Zhongshu (Chinese: 董仲舒; Wade–Giles: Tung Chung-shu; 179–104 BC) was a Chinese philosopher, politician, and writer of the Han dynasty. He is traditionally associated with the promotion of Confucianism as the official ideology of the Chinese imperial state, favoring heaven worship over the tradition of cults celebrating the five elements. Enjoying great influence in the court in the last decades of his life, his adversary Gongsun Hong ultimately promoted his partial retirement from political life by banishing him to the Chancellery of Weifang, but his teachings were transmitted from there.

== Biography ==
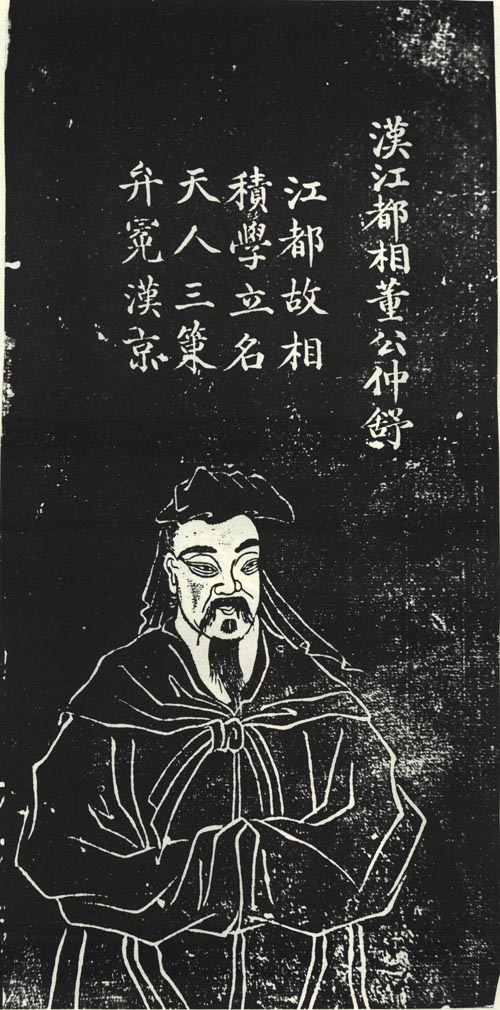
Engraved portrait of Dong Zhongshu

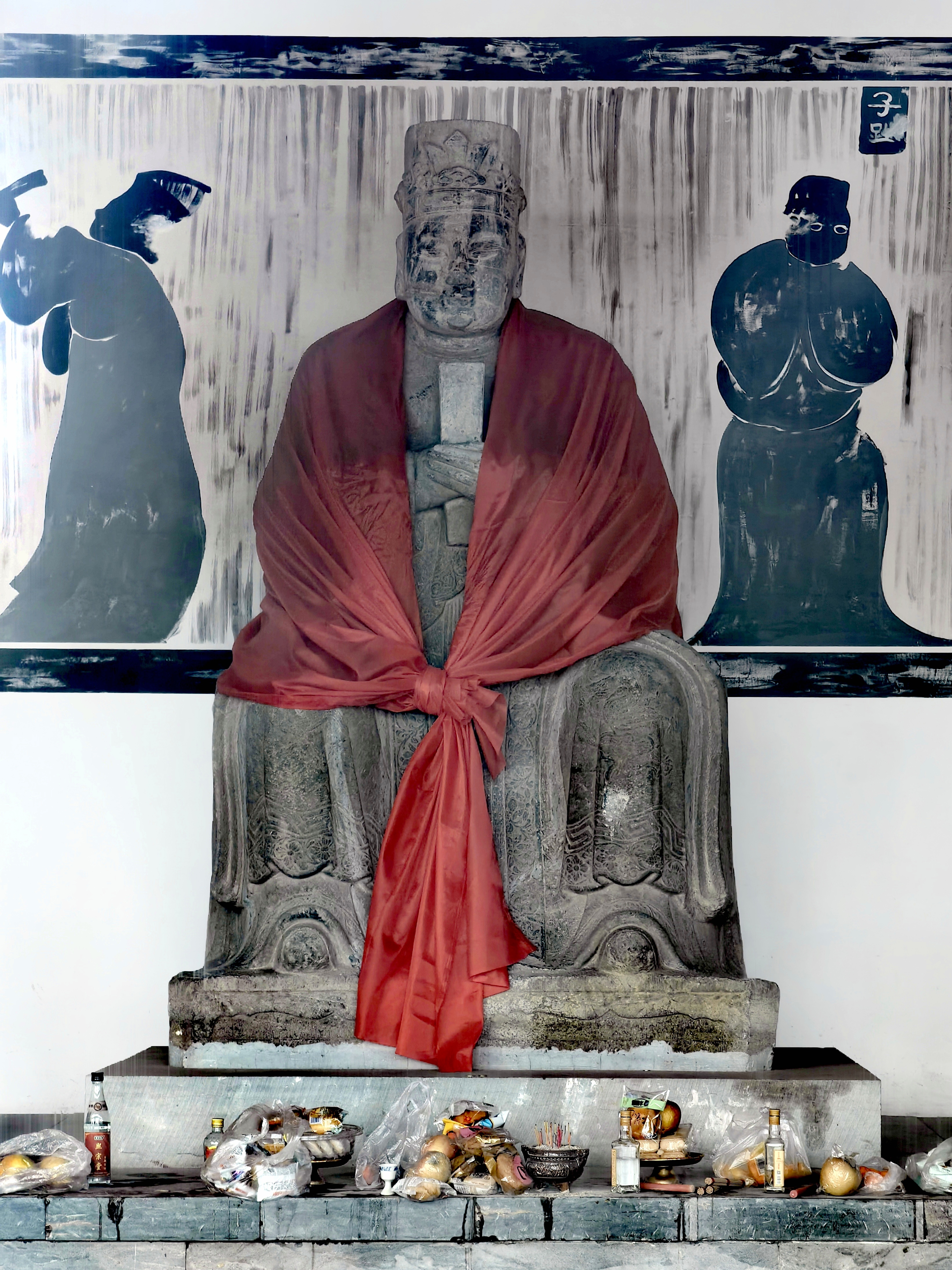
Stone statue of Dong Zhongshu, located at Zaoqiang County

Dong was born in modern Hengshui, Hebei, in 179 BC. His birthplace is associated with Wencheng Township (溫城鄉, now located in Jing Country), so in the Luxuriant Dew of the Spring and Autumn Annals he is once mentioned as Lord Dong of Wencheng (溫城董君).

He entered the imperial service during the reign of Emperor Jing of Han and rose to high office under Emperor Wu of Han. His relationship with the emperor was uneasy though. At one point he was thrown into prison and nearly executed for writings that were considered seditious, and may have cosmologically predicted the overthrow of the Han dynasty and its replacement by a Confucian sage, the first appearance of a theme that would later sweep Wang Mang to the imperial throne. He appears to have been protected by the emperor's chief counselor, Gongsun Hong.

Dong Zhongshu's thought integrated Yin Yang cosmology into a Confucian ethical framework. He emphasised the importance of the Spring and Autumn Annals as a source for both political and metaphysical ideas, following the tradition of the Gongyang Commentary by Gongyang Gao in seeking hidden meanings from its text. He is also considered the originator of the doctrine of Interactions Between Heaven and Mankind, which lays down rules for deciding the legitimacy of a monarch as well as providing a set of checks and balances for a reigning monarch. Dong expressed the idea of "three heritages", through which "a new king must keep safe the heritage of the two [earlier] kings as a means of maintaining the connection".

== Bibliography ==
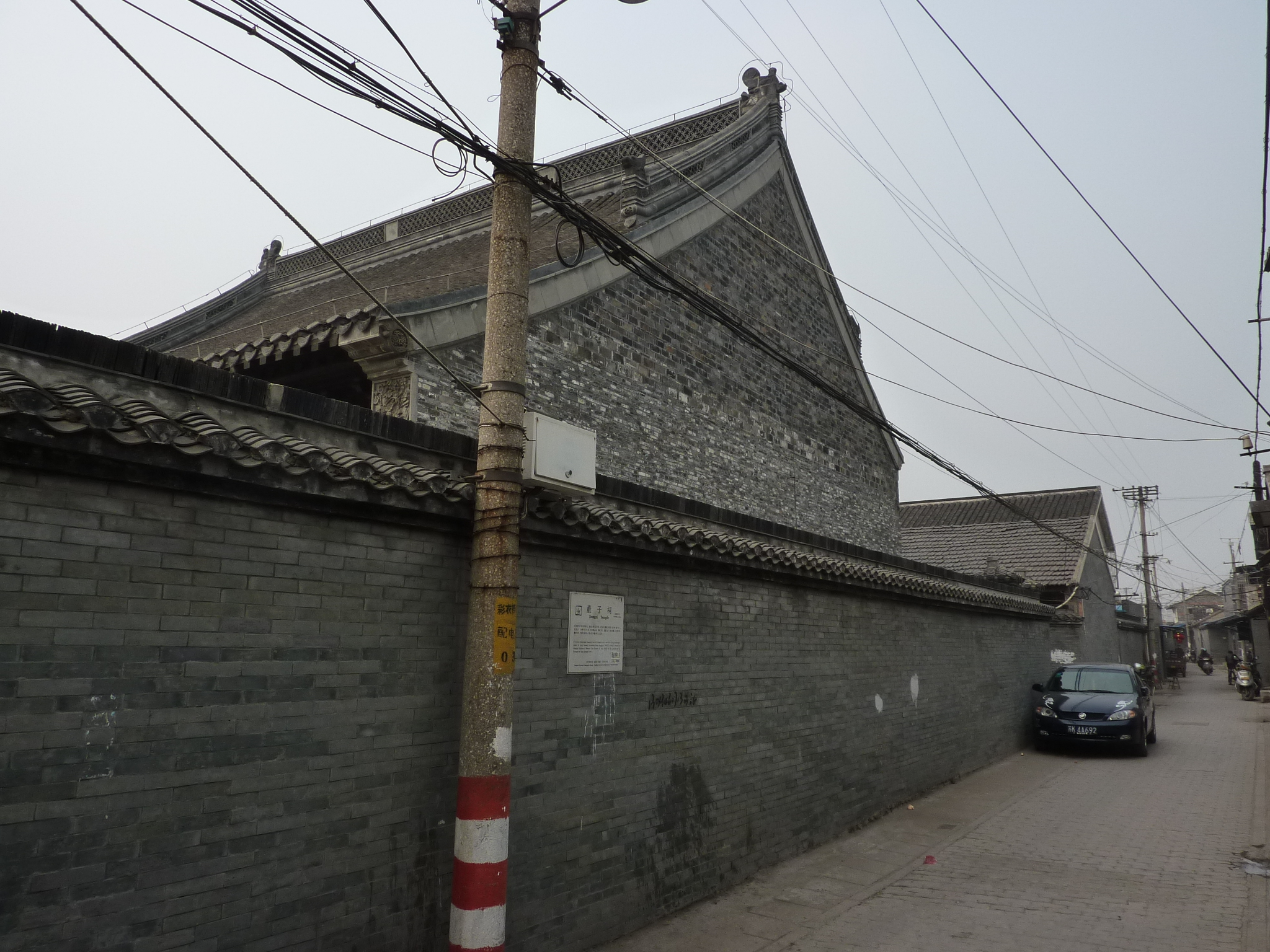
Temple in honor of Dong Zhongshu in Yangzhou

There are two works that are attributed to Dong Zhongshu, one of which is the Ju Xianliang Duice in three chapters, preserved under the Book of Han. The most significant text attributed to him is the Luxuriant Dew of the Spring and Autumn Annals, which is a commentary on the canonical Confucian text Spring and Summer Annals. The Luxuriant Dew of the Spring and Autumn Annals bears many marks of multiple authorship. Whether the work was written by Dong himself has been called into question by several scholars including Zhu Xi, Cheng Yanzuo, Dai Junren, Keimatsu Mitsuo, and Tanaka Masami.

Scholars now reject as later additions all the passages that discuss five elements theory, and much of the rest of the work is questionable as well. It seems safest to regard it as a collection of unrelated or loosely related chapters and shorter works, which could be subdivided into five categories. Most are more or less connected to the Gongyang Commentary and its school and written by a number of different persons at different times throughout the Han dynasty.

Other important sources for Dong Zhongshu's life and thought include his fu The Scholar's Frustration, his biography included in the Book of Han, his Yin Yang and stimulus-response theorizing noted at various places in the Book of Han "Treatise on the Five Elements," and the fragments of his legal discussions. Dong Zhongshu's theory of 'original qi' (yuanqi or 元氣), the five elements and on the development of history, were later adopted and modified by the late Qing reformer Kang Youwei in order to justify his theories of progress via political reform. It has been questioned, however, how correctly Kang Youwei understood Dong Zhongshu's thought.
