= Mao Commentary =

The Mao Commentary (traditional Chinese: 毛詩傳; simplified Chinese: 毛诗传; pinyin: Máo shī zhuàn) is one of the four early traditions of commentary on the Classic of Poetry. The Mao Commentary is attributed to either Mao Chang 萇 or Mao Heng 亨 (both pre 221 BCE; dates unclear). The "Yiwenzhi" of the Book of Han refers to the Mao Commentary under the title Maoshi guxun zhuan 毛詩故訓傳 as one of two works by Mao on the Classic of Poetry.

Zheng Xuan wrote a jian 箋 ("annotation") on the basis of the Mao commentary, a sub-commentary.

This commentary was not officially recognized until the reign of Emperor Ping (1 BC to 6 AD). However, during the Eastern Han period, the Mao Poetry gradually became the primary version. Proponents of the Mao Poetry said that its text was descended from the first generation of Confucius' students, and as such should be the authoritative version. Xu Shen's influential dictionary Shuowen Jiezi, written in the 2nd century AD, quotes almost exclusively from the Mao Poetry. Finally, the renowned Eastern Han scholar Zheng Xuan used the Mao Poetry as the basis for his annotated edition of the Poetry. By the 5th century, the Lu, Qi and Han traditions had died out, leaving only the Mao Poetry, which has become the received text in use today. Only isolated fragments of the Lu text survive, among the remains of the Xiping Stone Classics. Zheng Xuan's edition of the Mao text became the imperially authorized text and commentary on the Poetry in 653 AD.

Duan Yucai's (1735–1815) in his Maoshi guxun zhuan dingben 毛詩故訓傳定本 (preface 1784), includes the Mao commentary, the Zheng sub-commentary, and other commentarial material by Lu Deming (556-627) and Kong Yingda (574-648). Duan's produced this edition because previous editions confused the main text, the commentary, and the sub-commentary.
