= Han shi waizhuan =

Pages from a Ming dynasty printed edition of the Han shi waizhuan

A page from a 20th century printed edition of Han shi waizhuan

Han shi waizhuan (simplified Chinese: 韩诗外传; traditional Chinese: 韓詩外傳), translated as Exoteric traditions of the Han version of the Songs, Illustrations of the Didactic Application of the Classic of Songs, or "The Outer Commentary to the Book of Songs by Master Han", is a book written in the Western Han dynasty, attributed to Han Ying (Chinese: 韓嬰 fl. 150 BCE). It is a collection of some 300 anecdotes and stories chosen to highlight the poems of the Shi jing (Book of Poetry).

== Significance ==
The Book of Poetry, said to have been edited by Confucius, was among the texts suppressed during the Qin dynasty, but survived in four slightly different versions. The version preserved in the Mao family, known as the Mao shi, is the most complete and best known. The version preserved by the Han family, or "Han School", the Han shi, edited by Han Ying, reflects the family tradition of producing a quote from the Shijing to fit particular situations. The Han shi waizhuan collects stories or quotations to illustrate and interpret these quotes.

Han Ying's biography in the Historical Records of Sima Qian says that he compiled two commentaries, the neizhuan (inner) and the waizhuan (outer), whose interpretations "very much differed" from the Mao School and other schools.

The quotations and excerpts in the Hanshi waizhuan are useful in corroborating or doubting other pre-Qin texts, for instance, the text of the Xunzi.

== References and further reading ==
- "Han shi waizhuan (Exoteric traditions of the Han version of the Songs),"Knechtges, David R.; Chang, Taiping (2010). Ancient and Early Medieval Chinese Literature: A Reference Guide. Leiden Netherlands; Boston: Brill. pp. 334–339. ISBN 9789004191273.
- Idema, Wilt and Lloyd Haft (1997). A Guide to Chinese Literature. Ann Arbor: Center for Chinese Studies, The University of Michigan. ISBN 0892641231.
- Hightower, James Robert (1952). Han Shih Wai Chuan: Han Ying's Illustrations of the Didactic Application of the Classic of Songs. Cambridge: Harvard University Press. The Chinese text with Hightower's translation and annotation is online for free: link Traditions of Exemplary Women (University of Virginia).
- Sato, Masayuki (2003). The Confucian Quest for Order: The Origin and Formation of the Political Thought of Xun Zi. Leiden; Boston: Brill. ISBN 9004129650.

== See also ==
- Mao Commentary
