= Guliang Zhuan =

Commentary on the Spring and Autumn Annals

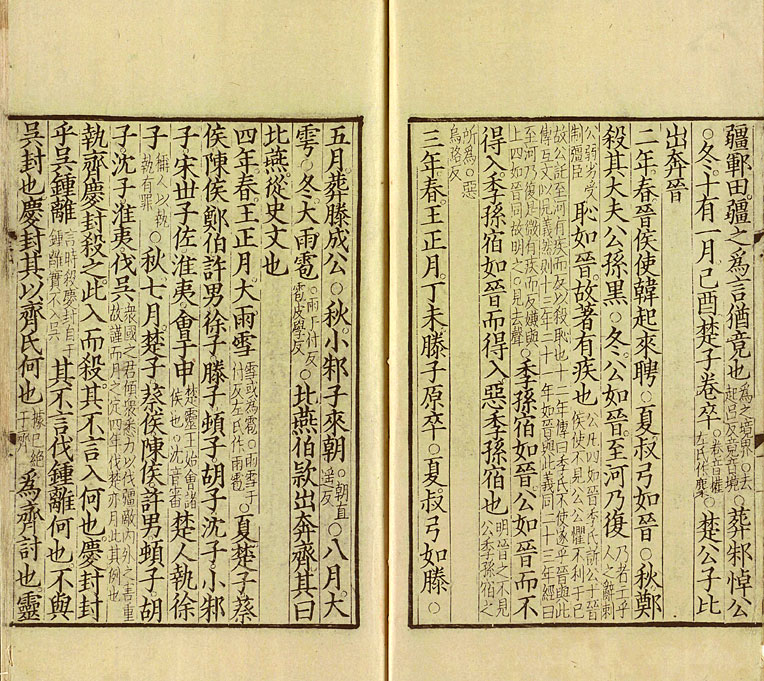
- Guliang Zhuan

Chinese name
- Traditional Chinese: 穀梁傳
- Simplified Chinese: 谷梁传
- Literal meaning: Commentaries of Guliang
Transcriptions
Standard Mandarin
- Hanyu Pinyin: Gǔliáng Zhuàn
- Wade–Giles: Ku^{3}-liang^{2} Chʻuan^{2}
- IPA: [kù.ljǎŋ ʈʂwân]
Yue: Cantonese
- Jyutping: guk1 loeng4 zyun6
Middle Chinese
- Middle Chinese: /kuk̚ lɨɐŋ ɖˠiuᴇn/
Old Chinese
- Zhengzhang: /*kloːɡ raŋ don/

Vietnamese name
- Vietnamese alphabet: Xuân Thu Cốc Lương truyện
- Chữ Hán: 春秋穀梁傳

Korean name
- Hangul: 춘추곡량전
- Hanja: 春秋穀梁傳
Transcriptions
- Revised Romanization: Chunchugongnyangjeon

Japanese name
- Kanji: 春秋穀梁伝
- Kana: しゅんじゅうこくりょうでん
Transcriptions
- Romanization: Shinjū Kokuryōden

The Guliang Zhuan is considered one of the classic books of ancient Chinese history. It is traditionally attributed to a writer from the state of Lu with the surname of Guliang in the disciple tradition of Zixia, but versions of his name vary and there is no definitive way to date the text. Although it may be based in part on oral traditions from as early as the Warring States period (475–221 BCE), the first references to the work appear in the Han dynasty, and the peak of its influence was the 1st century BCE. Along with the Zuo Zhuan and Gongyang Zhuan, the work is one of the Three Commentaries on the Spring and Autumn Annals.

Written in question and answer style, the work annotates the Spring and Autumn Annals covering the period between the first year of Lu ruler Duke Yin of Lu (722 BCE) and the fourteenth year of his later counterpart Duke Ai of Lu (魯哀公) (481 BCE). Like the Gongyang Zhuan, the Gǔliáng Zhuàn is written as a didactic explanation of the subtle political and social messages of the Spring and Autumn Annals rather than in the anecdotal style of the Zuo Zhuan. It is an important book for the study of the development of Confucianism from the Warring States period through the Han dynasty.

Today, the book is usually considered to be the work of the Han dynasty Confucian scholars and contains about 30,000 Chinese characters. Its focus is on clarifying Confucian debate on the political significance of the Spring and Autumn Annals in a style somewhat similar to the Gongyang Zhuan, but with many differences in both doctrine and interpretation. Its major concerns include the ritual code, political and familial hierarchies, and hereditary succession. In general, the Gǔliáng Zhuàn uses a somewhat simple explanatory style rather than the grandiloquent language adopted by the Gongyang Zhuan.
