= Chinese literature =

- Traditional Chinese: 中國文學
- Simplified Chinese: 中国文学
Transcriptions
Standard Mandarin
- Hanyu Pinyin: Zhōngguó wénxué
- Bopomofo: ㄓㄨㄥ ㄍㄨㄛˊ ㄨㄣˊ ㄒㄩㄝˊ
- Wade–Giles: Chung^{1}-kuo^{2} wen^{2}-hsüeh^{2}
- Tongyong Pinyin: Jhongguó wún-syué
- IPA: [ʈʂʊ́ŋ.kwǒ wə̌n.ɕɥě]
Wu
- Romanization: Tson^{平} koh^{入} vhen^{去} oh^{平}
Yue: Cantonese
- Yale Romanization: Jūng-gwok màhn-hohk
- Jyutping: zung1 gwok3 man4 hok6
- IPA: [tsʊŋ˥ kʷɔk̚˧ mɐn˩ hɔk̚˨]
Southern Min
- Tâi-lô: Tiong-kok bûn-ha̍k

The history of Chinese literature extends thousands of years, and begins with the earliest recorded inscriptions, court archives, building to the major works of philosophy and history written during the Axial Age. The Han (202 BC – 220 AD) and Tang (618–907 AD) dynasties were considered golden ages of poetry, while the Song (960–1279) and Yuan (1271–1368) were notable for their lyrics (ci), essays, dramas, and plays. During the Ming and Qing, mature novels were written in written vernacular Chinese, an evolution from the preeminence of Literary Chinese patterned off the language of the Chinese classics. The introduction of widespread woodblock printing during the Tang and the invention of movable type printing by Bi Sheng (990–1051) during the Song rapidly spread written knowledge throughout China. Around the turn of the 20th century, the author Lu Xun (1881–1936) is considered an influential voice of vernacular Chinese literature.

== Pre-classical period ==
Formation of the earliest layer of Chinese literature was influenced by oral traditions of different social and professional provenance: cult and lay musical practices (Shijing), divination (Yi jing, Guicang and Lianshan), astronomy, ritual (Etiquette and Ceremonial), exorcism, etc. An attempt at tracing the genealogy of Chinese literature to religious spells and incantations (the six zhu 六祝, as presented in the "Da zhu" chapter of the Rites of Zhou) was made by Liu Shipei.

== Classical texts ==
There is a wealth of early Chinese literature dating from the Hundred Schools of Thought that occurred during the Eastern Zhou dynasty (770–256 BC). The most important of these include the Classics of Confucianism, of Daoism, of Mohism, of Legalism, as well as works of military science and Chinese history. Note that, except for the books of poems and songs, most of this literature is philosophical and didactic; there is little in the way of fiction. However, these texts maintained their significance through both their ideas and their prose style.

The Confucian works in particular have been of high importance to Chinese culture and history, as a set of works known as the Four Books and Five Classics were, in the 12th century AD, chosen as the basis for the Imperial examination for any government post. These nine books therefore became the center of the educational system. They have been grouped into two categories: the Five Classics, allegedly commented and edited by Confucius, and the Four Books. The Five Classics are:

1. the I Ching, or Classic of Changes, a divination manual; (Note: Attributed to the mythical emperor Fu Xi and based on eight trigrams, the I Ching is still used by adherents of Chinese folk religion.)
2. the Classic of Poetry, a collection of poems, folk songs, festival and ceremonial songs, hymns and eulogies;
3. the Book of Rites or Record of Rites;
4. the Book of Documents, an early Chinese prose collection of documents and speeches allegedly written by rulers and officials of the early Zhou period and earlier;
5. the Spring and Autumn Annals, a historical record of Confucius' native state, Lu, from 722 to 479 BC.

The Four Books are:

1. the Analects of Confucius, a book of pithy sayings attributed to Confucius and recorded by his disciples;
2. the Mencius, a collection of political dialogues;
3. the Doctrine of the Mean, a book that teaches the path to Confucian virtue; and
4. the Great Learning, a book about education, self-cultivation and the Dao.

Other important philosophical works include the Mohist Mozi, which taught "inclusive love" as both an ethical and social principle, and Hanfeizi, one of the central Legalist texts.

Important Daoist classics include the Dao De Jing, the Zhuangzi, and the Liezi. Later authors combined Daoism with Confucianism and Legalism, such as Liu An (2nd century BC), whose Huainanzi (The Philosophers of Huai-nan) also added to the fields of geography and topography.

Among the classics of military science, The Art of War by Sun Tzu (6th century BC) was perhaps the first to outline guidelines for effective international diplomacy. It was also the first in a tradition of Chinese military treatises, such as the Wujing Zongyao (Collection of the Most Important Military Techniques, 1044 AD) and the Huolongjing (Fire Dragon Manual, 14th century AD).

== Historical texts, dictionaries and encyclopedias ==
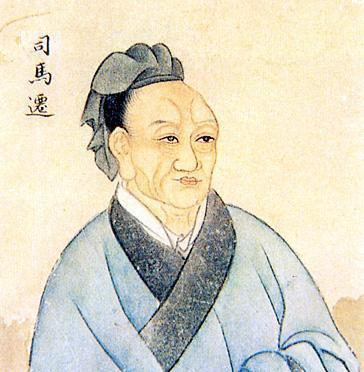
Sima Qian laid the ground for professional Chinese historiography more than 2,000 years ago.

The Chinese kept consistent and accurate court records, and although their calendars varied from court to court, these disparate records could be aligned without evident contradiction by the year 841 BC, at the beginning of the Gonghe Regency of the Western Zhou dynasty. The earliest known narrative history of China was the Zuo Zhuan, which was compiled no later than 389 BC, and attributed to the blind 5th-century BC historian Zuo Qiuming. The Book of Documents is thought to have been compiled as far back as the 6th century BC, and was certainly compiled by the 4th century BC, the latest date for the writing of the Guodian Chu Slips unearthed in a Hubei tomb in 1993. The Book of Documents included early information on geography in the Yu Gong chapter. The Bamboo Annals found in 281 AD in the tomb of the King of Wei, who was interred in 296 BC, provide another example; however, unlike the Zuo Zhuan, the authenticity of the early date of the Bamboo Annals is in doubt. Another early text was the political strategy book of the Zhan Guo Ce, compiled between the 3rd and 1st centuries BC, with partial amounts of the text found amongst the 2nd century BC tomb site at Mawangdui. The oldest extant dictionary in China is the Erya, dated to the 3rd century BC, anonymously written but with later commentary by the historian Guo Pu (276–324). Other early dictionaries include the Fangyan by Yang Xiong (53 BC – 18 AD) and the Shuowen Jiezi by Xu Shen (58–147 AD). One of the largest was the Kangxi Dictionary compiled by 1716 under the auspices of the Kangxi Emperor (r. 1661–1722); it provides definitions for over 47,000 characters.

Although court records and other independent records existed beforehand, the definitive work in early Chinese historical writing was the Shiji, or Records of the Grand Historian written by Han dynasty court historian Sima Qian (145 BC – 90 BC). This text laid the foundation for Chinese historiography and the multiple official Chinese historical texts compiled for each dynasty thereafter. Sima Qian is often compared to the Greek Herodotus in scope and method, because he covered Chinese history from the mythical Xia dynasty until the contemporary reign of Emperor Wu of Han while retaining an objective and non-biased standpoint. This was often difficult for the official dynastic historians, who used historical works to justify the reign of the current dynasty. He influenced the written works of a number of Chinese historians, including the works of Ban Gu and Ban Zhao in the 1st and 2nd centuries, and even Sima Guang's 11th-century compilation of the Zizhi Tongjian, presented to Emperor Shenzong of Song in 1084 AD. The overall scope of the historiographical tradition in China is termed the Twenty-Four Histories, created for each successive Chinese dynasty up until the Ming dynasty (1368–1644); China's last dynasty, the Qing dynasty (1644–1911), is not included.

Large encyclopedias were also produced in China through the ages. The Yiwen Leiju encyclopedia was completed by Ouyang Xun in 624 during the Tang dynasty, with aid from scholars Linghu Defen and Chen Shuda. During the Song dynasty, the compilation of the Four Great Books of Song (10th century – 11th century), begun by Li Fang and completed by Cefu Yuangui, represented a massive undertaking of written material covering a wide range of different subjects. This included the Taiping Guangji (978), the Taiping Yulan (983), the Wenyuan Yinghua (986), and the Cefu Yuangui (1013). Although these Song dynasty Chinese encyclopedias featured millions of written Chinese characters each, their aggregate size paled in comparison to the later Yongle Encyclopedia (1408) of the Ming dynasty, which contained a total of 50 million Chinese characters. Even this size was trumped by later Qing dynasty encyclopedias, such as the printed the Complete Classics Collection of Ancient China (1726), which featured over 100 million written Chinese characters in over 800,000 pages, printed in 60 different copies using copper-metal Chinese movable type printing. Other great encyclopedic writers include the polymath scientist Shen Kuo (1031–1095) and his Dream Pool Essays, the agronomist and inventor Wang Zhen (fl. 1290–1333) and his Nongshu, and the minor scholar-official Song Yingxing (1587–1666) and his Tiangong Kaiwu.

== Classical poetry ==
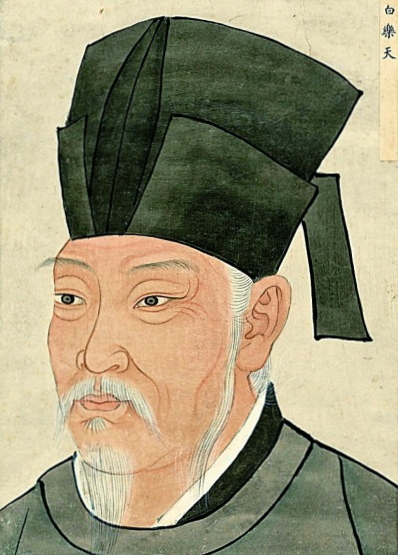
Bai Juyi (772–846), a famous Tang dynasty poet and statesman

The rich tradition of Chinese poetry began with two influential collections. In northern China, the Shijing or Classic of Poetry (approx. 11th–7th century BC) comprises over 300 poems in a variety of styles ranging from those with a strong suggestion of folk music to ceremonial hymns. The word shi has the basic meaning of poem or poetry, as well as its use in criticism to describe one of China's lyrical poetic genres. Confucius is traditionally credited with editing the Shijing. Its stately verses are usually composed of couplets with lines of four characters each (or four syllables, as Chinese characters are monosyllabic), and a formal structure of end rhymes. A number of these early poems establish the later tradition of starting with a description of nature that leads into emotionally expressive statements, known as bi, xing, or sometime bixing. Associated with what was then considered to be southern China, the Chuci is ascribed to Qu Yuan (c. 340–278 BC) and his follower Song Yu (fl. 3rd century BC) and is distinguished by its more emotionally intense affect, often full of despair and descriptions of the fantastic. In some of its sections, the Chu Ci uses a six-character per line meter, dividing these lines into couplets separated in the middle by a strong caesura, producing a driving and dramatic rhythm. Both the Shijing and the Chuci have remained influential throughout Chinese history.

During the greater part of China's first great period of unification, begun with the short-lived Qin dynasty (221 BC – 206 BC) and followed by the centuries-long Han dynasty (206 BC – 220 AD), the shi form of poetry underwent little innovation. But a distinctively descriptive and erudite fu form (not the same fu character as that used for the bureau of music) developed that has been called "rhyme-prose", a uniquely Han offshoot of Chinese poetry's tradition. Equally noteworthy is Music Bureau poetry (yuefu), collected and presumably refined popular lyrics from folk music. The end of the Han witnesses a resurgence of the shi poetry, with the anonymous 19 Old Poems. This collection reflects the emergence of a distinctive five-character line that later became shi poetry's most common line length. From the Jian'an reign period (196 – 220 AD) onward, the five-character line became a focus for innovations in style and theme. The Cao family, rulers of the Wei dynasty (220 – 265 AD) during the post-Han Three Kingdoms period, distinguished themselves as poets by writing poems filled with sympathy for the day-to-day struggles of soldiery and the common people. Taoist philosophy became a different, common theme for other poets, and a genre emphasizing true feeling emerged led by Ruan Ji (210–263). The landscape genre of Chinese nature poetry emerged under the brush of Xie Lingyun (385–433), as he innovated distinctively descriptive and complementary couplets composed of five-character lines. A farmland genre was born in obscurity by Tao Qian (365–427) also known as Tao Yuanming as he labored in his fields and then wrote extolling the influence of wine. Toward the close of this period in which multiple later-developed themes were first experimented with, the Xiao family of the Southern Liang dynasty (502–557) engaged in highly refined and often denigrated court-style poetry lushly describing sensual delights as well as the description of objects.

Reunified China's Tang dynasty (618–907) high culture set a high point for a number of things, including poetry. Various schools of Buddhism (a religion from India) flourished as represented by the Chan (or Zen) beliefs of Wang Wei (701–761). His quatrains (jueju) describing natural scenes are world-famous examples of excellence, each couplet conventionally containing about two distinct images or thoughts per line. Tang poetry's big star is Li Bai (701–762) also pronounced and written as Li Bo, who worked in all major styles, both the more free old style verse (gutishi) as well as the tonally regulated new style verse (jintishi). Regardless of genre, Tang poets notably strove to perfect a style in which poetic subjects are exposed and evident, often without directly referring to the emotional thrust at hand. The poet Du Fu (712–770) excelled at regulated verse and use of the seven-character line, writing denser poems with more allusions as he aged, experiencing hardship and writing about it. A parade of great Tang poets also includes Chen Zi'ang (661–702), Wang Zhihuan (688–742), Meng Haoran (689–740), Bai Juyi (772–846), Li He (790–816), Du Mu (803–852), Wen Tingyun (812–870), (listed chronologically) and Li Shangyin (813–858), whose poetry delights in allusions that often remain obscure, and whose emphasis on the seven-character line also contributed to the emerging posthumous fame of Du Fu, now ranked alongside Li Bai. The distinctively different ci poetry form began its development during the Tang as Central Asian and other musical influences flowed through its cosmopolitan society.

The Song dynasty (960–1279), another period of reunification after a brief period of disunity, saw a fresh high culture. Several of its greatest poets were capable government officials, including Ouyang Xiu (1007–1072), Su Shi (1037–1101), and Wang Anshi (1021–1086). The ci form flourished as a few hundred songs became standard templates for poems with distinctive and variously set meters. The free and expressive style of Song high culture has been contrasted with majestic Tang poems. One scholar writes that "it has long been fashionable, ever since the Song itself, for poets and critics to think of the poetry of the Song as stylistically distinct from that of the Tang, and to debate its merits relative to the earlier work." Additional musical influences contributed to the Yuan dynasty's (1279–1368) distinctive qu opera culture and spawned the sanqu form of individual poems based on it.

Classical Chinese poetry composition became a conventional skill of the well-educated throughout the Ming (1368–1644) and Qing (1644–1911) dynasties. Over a million poems have been preserved, including those by women, such as Dong Xiaowan and Liu Rushi, and by multiple other voices. Painter-poets, such as Shen Zhou (1427–1509), Tang Yin (1470–1524), Wen Zhengming (1470–1559), and Yun Shouping (1633–1690), created worthy poems as they combined art, poetry and calligraphy with brush on paper. Poetry composition competitions were socially common. While China's late imperial period is not known for innovative approaches to poetry, the scholar Jonathan Chaves urged that the "sheer quantity of Ming poetry, the quality of so much of it, and its stylistic richness and diversity all cry out for serious attention."

== Classical prose ==
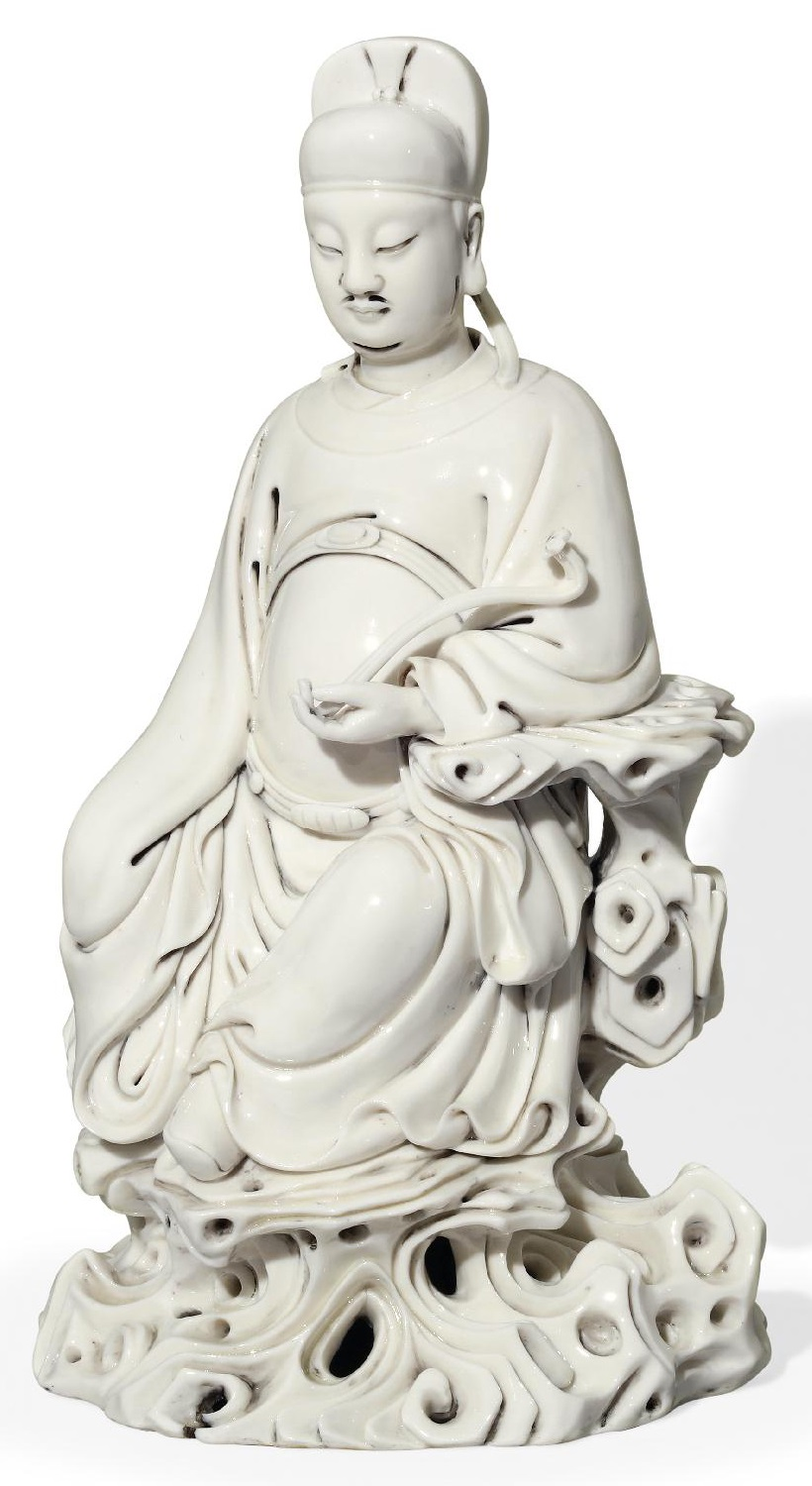
A Ming dynasty Dehua porcelain sculpture of Wenchang Wang, a Chinese deity of literature

Early Chinese prose was deeply influenced by the great philosophical writings of the Hundred Schools of Thought (770–221 BC). The works of Mozi, Mencius, and Zhuang Zhou contain well-reasoned, carefully developed discourses that reveal much stronger organization and style than their predecessors. Mozi's polemic prose was built on solid and effective methodological reasoning. Mencius contributed elegant diction and, like Zhuang Zhou, relied on comparisons, anecdotes, and allegories. By the 3rd century BC, these writers had developed a simple, concise and economical style that served as a model literary form for over two millennia. These were written in Classical Chinese, which mostly represented the spoken language during the Spring and Autumn period.

During the Tang dynasty, the ornate, artificial style of prose developed in previous periods was replaced by a simple, direct, and forceful prose based on examples from the Hundred Schools and the Han dynasty, the period in which the great historical works of Sima Tan and Sima Qian were published. This neoclassical style dominated prose writing for the next 800 years. It was exemplified in the work of Han Yu (768–824), a master essayist and strong advocate of a return to Confucian orthodoxy; Han Yu was later listed as one of the "Eight Great Prose Masters of the Tang and Song".

The Song dynasty saw the rise in popularity of "travel record literature" (youji wenxue). Travel literature combined both diary and narrative prose formats, it was practised by seasoned travellers like Fan Chengda (1126–1193) and Xu Xiake (1587–1641), and can be seen in the example of Su Shi's Record of Stone Bell Mountain.

After the 14th century, vernacular fiction became popular, at least outside of court circles. Vernacular fiction covered a broader range of subject matter and was longer and more loosely structured than literary fiction. One of the masterpieces of Chinese vernacular fiction is the 18th-century literati novel Dream of the Red Chamber.

=== Classical fiction and drama ===
Pages from a printed edition of the 17th century novel Xingshi Yinyuan Zhuan (translated as The Bonds of Matrimony and others) written by Xizhou Sheng, one of the longest Chinese novels of the time at over a million words

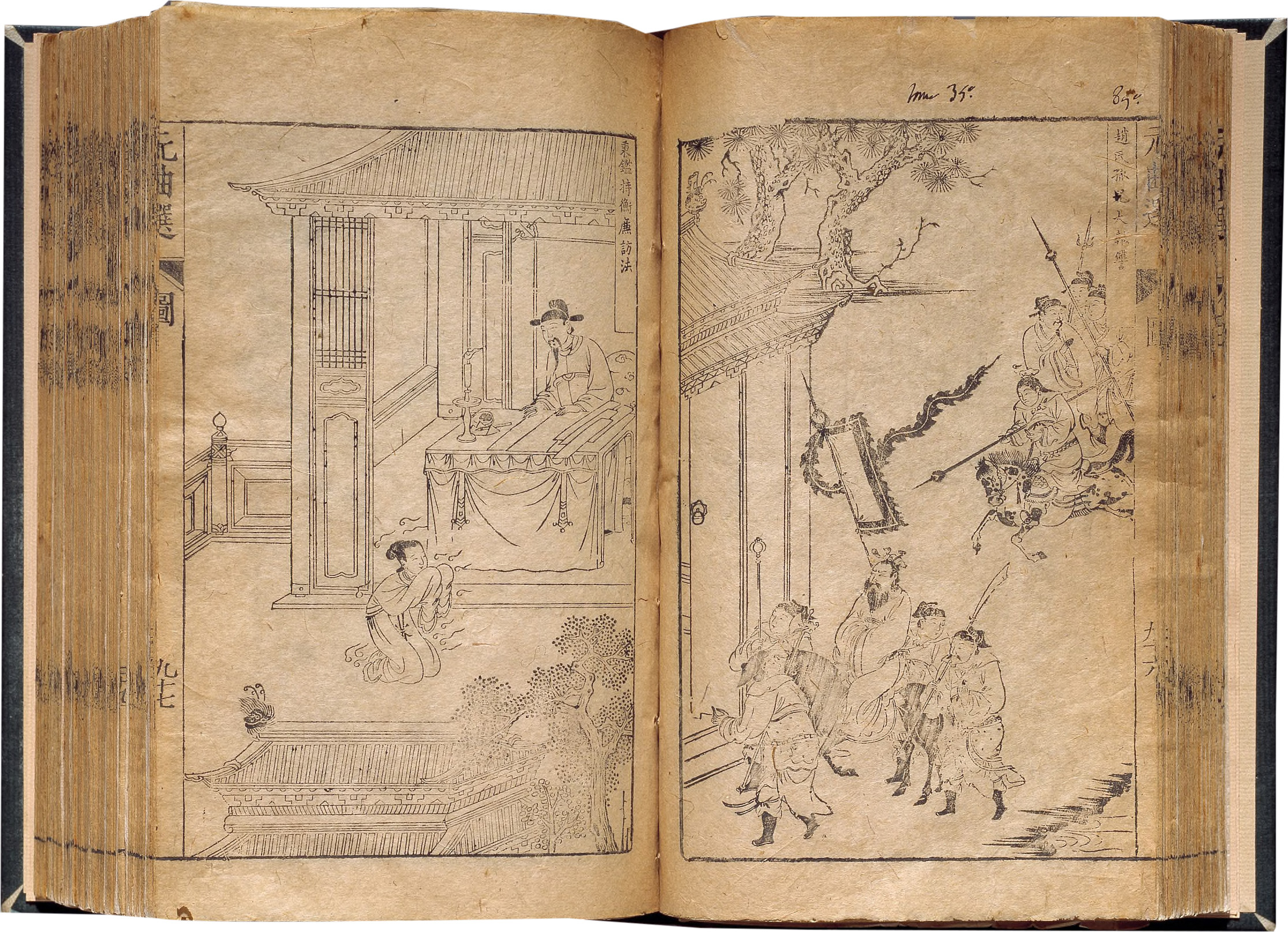
Illustrations from the collection "Selected One Hundred Plays of the Yuan dynasty", compiled by Zang Maoxun from the Ming dynasty

Chinese fiction was rooted in narratives, official histories and less formal works such as the Tale of King Mu, Son of Heaven, Yandanzi, Hainei shizhou ji, Garden of Stories, Xinxu, Shenyijing, Lieyi Zhuan, Bowuzhi, Xijing Zaji, Shi Yi Ji, In Search of the Supernatural and A New Account of the Tales of the World (4th and 5th centuries), and You Ming Lu, etc. Finest Flowers from the World of Letters is a 10th-century compilation of earlier works, while the Great Tang Records on the Western Regions was completed by a pilgrim to India named Xuanzang in 646. Miscellaneous Morsels from Youyang was one of the best known collections of Literary Chinese chuanqi from the Tang dynasty, and the Taiping Guangji preserved the corpus of these Tang dynasty tales. There was a range of less formal works either oral or using oral conventions, such as bianwen, pingshu, and huaben, which formed background to the novel as early as the Song dynasty. The novel as an extended prose narrative which realistically creates a believable world of its own evolved in China and in Europe from the 14th–18th centuries, though a little earlier in China. Chinese audiences were more interested in history and Chinese authors generally did not present their works as fictional. Readers appreciated relative optimism, moral humanism, relative emphasis on group behavior, and welfare of the society.

With the rise of monetary economy and urbanization beginning in the Song dynasty, there was a growing professionalization of entertainment fostered by the spread of printing, the rise of literacy and education. In both China and Europe, the novel gradually became more autobiographical and serious in exploration of social, moral, and philosophical problems. Chinese fiction of the late Ming dynasty and early Qing dynasty was varied, self-conscious, and experimental.

Drama is another significant component of Chinese literature. For examples, the zaju and chuanqi were two of the major Chinese dramatic traditions in the second millennium. Of the thousands of zaju plays that were recorded in history, only about a few hundred of these plays are extant (estimates range from around 200 surviving zaju plays to about 530 intact Yuan dynasty variety plays).

== Modern literature ==
Scholars now tend to agree that modern Chinese literature did not erupt suddenly in the New Culture Movement (1910s–1920s). Instead, they trace its origins back at least to the late Qing period (1895–1911) and at most to the 17th century.

=== Late Qing (1895–1911) ===
The late Qing was a period of intellectual ferment sparked by a sense of national crisis. Around the beginning of the 20th century, reform-minded intellectuals used fiction as a mechanism for critique of politics and history. Among other examples, reformist intellectuals used the foreign genre of science fiction to project their teleological view of national rejuvenation and technological development.

Intellectuals began to seek solutions to China's problems outside of its own tradition. They translated works of Western expository writing and literature, which enthralled readers with new ideas and opened up windows onto new exotic cultures. Most outstanding were the translations of Yan Fu (嚴復) (1864–1921) and Lin Shu (林紓) (1852–1924). In this climate, a boom in the writing of fiction occurred, especially after the 1905 abolition of the civil service examination when literati struggled to fill new social and cultural roles for themselves. Stylistically, this fiction shows signs of both the Chinese novelistic tradition and Western narrative modes. In subject matter, it is strikingly concerned with the contemporary: social problems, historical upheaval, changing ethical values, etc. In this sense, late Qing fiction is modern. Important novelists of the period include Wu Woyao (吳沃堯) (1866–1910), Li Boyuan (李伯元) (1867–1906), Liu E (劉鶚) (1857–1909), and Zeng Pu (曾樸) (1872–1935).

The late Qing also saw a "revolution in poetry" (詩界革命), which promoted experimentation with new forms and the incorporation of new registers of language. However, the poetry scene was still dominated by the adherents to the Tongguang School (named after the Tongzhi and Guangxu reigns of the Qing), whose leaders—Chen Yan (陳衍), Chen Sanli (陳三立), Zheng Xiaoxu (鄭孝胥), and Shen Zengzhi (沈曾植)—promoted a Song style in the manner of Huang Tingjian. These poets would become the objects of scorn by New Culturalists like Hu Shih, who saw their work as overly allusive, artificial, and divorced from contemporary reality.

In drama, the late Qing saw the emergence of the new "civilized drama" (文明戲), a hybrid of Chinese operatic drama with Western-style spoken drama. Peking opera and "reformed Peking opera" were also popular at the time.

=== Republican Era (1912–49) ===
The literary scene in the first few years before the collapse of the Qing in 1911 was dominated by popular love stories, some written in the classical language and some in the vernacular. This entertainment fiction would later be labeled "Mandarin Ducks and Butterflies" fiction by New Culturalists, who despised its lack of social engagement. Throughout much of the Republican era, Butterfly fiction would reach many more readers than its "progressive" counterpart.

In the course of the New Culture Movement during the 1910s and 1920s decades, the vernacular language largely displaced the classical in all areas of literature and writing. Literary reformers Hu Shih (1891–1962) and Chen Duxiu (1880–1942) declared the classical language "dead" and promoted the vibrant vernacular in its stead. Hu Shih once said, "A dead language can never produce a living literature." In terms of literary practice, Lu Xun (1881–1936) is usually said to be the first major stylist in the new vernacular prose that Hu Shih and Chen Duxiu were promoting. Publishing in the United States in a journal for overseas Chinese students, Chen Hengzhe published the first short story in the vernacular. Another female writer who, in the words of scholar Nicole Huang, "persistently experimented with new literary language" is Eileen Chang.

Fiction became increasingly polemical in the 1920s as leftist writers used it to promote a progressive agenda. Much of the May Fourth fiction focused on realism. Among the more fantastical body of May Fourth literature, depicting dystopia was the trend.

Though often said to be less successful than their counterparts in fiction writing, poets also experimented with the vernacular in new poetic forms, such as free verse and the sonnet. Given that there was no tradition of writing poetry in the vernacular, these experiments were more radical than those in fiction writing and also less easily accepted by the reading public. Modern poetry flourished especially in the 1930s, in the hands of poets like Zhu Xiang (朱湘), Dai Wangshu, Li Jinfa (李金發), Wen Yiduo, and Ge Xiao (葛蕭). Other poets, even those among the May Fourth radicals (e.g., Yu Dafu), continued to write poetry in classical styles.

May Fourth radicalism, combined with changes in the education system, made possible the emergence of a large group of women writers. While there had been women writers in the late imperial period and the late Qing, they had been few in number. These writers generally tackled domestic issues, such as relations between the sexes, family, friendship and war, Eileen Chang's writing uses the spatial specificities of the modern apartment as essential to the construction of a vision of life in wartime. But they were revolutionary in giving direct expression to female subjectivity. Ding Ling's story Miss Sophia's Diary exposes the thoughts and feelings of its female diarist in all their complexity.

In the Republican period, the female literary archetypes of the "New Woman" and the "Modern Girl" developed as a response to the Confucian ideal of "good wives" and "wise mothers." Depictions of these new feminine archetypes often varied significantly between female and male writers. In literature written by women, the Modern Girl represented the struggle women confronted in establishing their voices in a changing China. These Modern Girls were sometimes disillusioned with modernity. Male-authored works often portrayed the Modern Girl as a femme fatale who rejected chastity in favor of bodily pleasure and consumerism. The "New Woman" frequently emphasized nationalistic themes. Both of these archetypes appeared in literature dealing with debates over birth control and abortion in China.

The 1920s and 1930s saw the emergence of spoken drama. Most outstanding among playwrights of the day are Ouyang Yuqian, Hong Shen, Tian Han, and Cao Yu. More popular than this Western-style drama, however, was Peking opera, raised to new artistic heights by the likes of Mei Lanfang.

In these decades, mass-appeal fiction which elites deemed culturally insignificant became known as "butterfly fiction," a label largely equivalent to the English phrase low-brow fiction.

In the late 1920s and 1930s, literary journals and societies espousing various artistic theories proliferated. Among the major writers of the period were Guo Moruo (1892–1978), a poet, historian, essayist, and critic; Mao Dun (1896–1981), the first of the novelists to emerge from the League of Left-Wing Writers and one whose work reflected the revolutionary struggle and disillusionment of the late 1920s; satirist and novelist Lao She (1899–1966); and Ba Jin (1904–2005), a novelist whose work was influenced by Ivan Turgenev and other Russian writers. In the 1930s Ba Jin produced a trilogy that depicted the struggle of modern youth against the age-old dominance of the Confucian family system. Comparison often is made between Jia (Family), one of the novels in the trilogy, and Dream of the Red Chamber. A number of these writers became administrators of artistic and literary policy after 1949. Most of those authors who were still alive during the Cultural Revolution (1966–76) were either purged or forced to submit to public humiliation.

The League of Left-Wing Writers founded in 1930 included Lu Xun among its leadership. By 1932 it had adopted the Soviet doctrine of socialist realism; that is, the insistence that art must concentrate on contemporary events in a realistic way, exposing the ills of nonsocialist society and promoting a glorious future under communism.

Other styles of literature were at odds with the highly-political literature being promoted by the League. The New Sensationists (新感覺派)—a group of writers based in Shanghai who were influenced, to varying degrees, by Western and Japanese modernism—wrote fiction that was more concerned with the unconscious and with aesthetics than with politics or social problems. Most important among these writers were Mu Shiying, Liu Na'ou (劉吶鷗), and Shi Zhecun. Other writers, including Shen Congwen and Fei Ming (廢名), balked at the utilitarian role for literature by writing lyrical, almost nostalgic, depictions of the countryside. Lin Yutang, who had studied at Harvard and Leipzig, introduced the concept of youmo (humor), which he used in trenchant criticism of China's political and cultural situation before leaving for the United States.

Themes of "revolution plus love" became a left-wing literary fashion during the 1930s, although it was also criticized from the left including by Mao Dun. In this narrative formula, the story begins with conflict between the revolutionary mission and romantic love, followed by calls for the protagonists to devote themselves to revolution and set aside their personal feelings, and ultimately results in the couple working together for the revolution in a form of love itself. As described by academic David Der-Wei Wang, "[R]evolution plus love functioned both as a literary trope, titillating and sustaining a society's desire for self-reform, and as a political mandate, calling for the redisposition of the social body in both public and personal spheres."

During the Second Sino-Japanese War, there was a revival of writing classical-style poetry.

The Chinese Communist Party had established a base after the Long March in Yan'an. In 1942, Mao Zedong gave a series of lectures, the Talks at the Yan'an Forum on Art and Literature, that clearly made literature subservient to politics via the Yan'an Rectification Movement. The Yan'an Talks articulated the view that socialist literature should not merely reflect existing culture, but should help culturally produce the consciousness of a new society. Mao articulated five independent although related categories of creative consideration for socialist cultural production: (1) class stand, (2) attitude, (3) audience, (4) work style, and (5) popularization/massification. The Yan'an Talks would become the national guideline for culture after the establishment of the People's Republic of China.

Consistent with political goals of mobilizing the masses, literary depictions of Party cadres became important. Literature of the period represented good cadres as those who took the lead on the road to socialism while adopting a theme of antibureaucratism to criticize cadres who sought special privileges.

=== Maoist Era (1949–76) ===
After coming to power in 1949, the Communists gradually nationalized the publishing industry, centralized the book distribution system, and brought writers under institutional control through the Writers Union. A system of strict censorship was implemented, with Mao's Yan'an Talks as the guiding force. Periodic literary campaigns targeted figures such as Hu Shih and other figures from the New Culture period, especially Hu Feng, a protege of Lu Xun who, along with his wife Mei Zhi, did not toe the Party line on literature.

In the early 1950s, programs developed to encourage and develop workers as writers. Among the most widely-known was the Literary Lecture Institute, founded by Ding Ling.

Socialist realism became the uniform style, and multiple Soviet works were translated. The "two-in-one" principle of socialist literature combined revolutionary realism and revolutionary romanticism. The widely read genre of revolutionary history romance emphasized depicting stories in the pre-founding of the PRC, and included novels like Red Crag, The Song of Youth, Defend Yan'an, and The Red Sun.

A surge of science fantasy writing, which emphasized technological marvels and novelties, occurred from the mid-1950s to the 1960s. Academic Rudolf Wagner writes that this trend was influenced by the Marching Toward Science campaign.

In the first twenty years after the founding of the People's Republic of China, multiple literary works addressed the close relationship between rural Chinese and the Communist Party. Peasant novels portrayed the peasant experience during the land reform movement and in the forming of rural communes. These included works such as A Chronicle of Creation and Three Mile Bay.

At the time of the Great Leap Forward (1957–59), the government increased its insistence on the use of socialist realism. Class struggle was a frequent narrative structure and political mode of expression in literature of the late 1950s. These narratives depicted class struggle as a way to resolve social conflict, usually through the protagonists uncovering a conspiracy between new and old class enemies.

During the 1960s, the Maoist view of class struggle focused on challenging revisionism within society through the socialist education movement, and, motivated by concerns that Party bureaucrats might become a new bourgeoisie, implementing class struggle within the party itself. Literature of the period reflected both strands of class struggle.

Local government bureaus and work units composed cultural works such as songs and dramas in an effort to overturn traditional cultural preferences for early marriage, large families, and sons over daughters. Academic Sarah Mellors Rodriguez writes that though these works of birth planning propaganda may seem trite to modern audiences, their themes spoke directly to widespread concerns among Chinese people at the time.

Mao Zedong's poetry, written before and after the founding of the PRC, include such works as:

  - Changsha 沁园春·长沙 (1925)
  - Double Ninth Festival 采桑子·重阳 (1929)
  - Long March 七律·长征 (1935)
  - Snow 沁园春·雪 (1936)
  - The People's Liberation Army occupied Nanjing 七律·人民解放军占领南京 (1949)
  - Swimming 水调歌头·游泳 (1956)
  - Ode to the Plum Blossom 卜算子咏梅 (1961)

From the 1950s, literary trends on Taiwan include modernist poetry, including avant-garde and surrealism, led by Qin Zihao (1902–1963) and Ji Xian (b. 1903).

==== Cultural Revolution ====
During the Cultural Revolution (1966–1976), Mao's wife, Jiang Qing led the campaign against "feudal" and "bourgeois" culture. The only stage productions allowed were her "Eight Model Operas", which combined traditional and western forms, while great fanfare was given to politically orthodox films and heroic novels, such as those by Hao Ran (浩然).

The principles for cultural production laid out by Mao in the 1942 Talks at the Yan'an Forum became dogmatized during the Cultural Revolution.

During the Cultural Revolution, the long-form novel was an emphasized form of literature. Among the major genres were novels about the experiences of sent-down youth. These included novels written by sent-down youths themselves, such as Zhang Kangkang's 1975 novel Dividing Line and Zhang Changgong's 1973 novel Youth.

Literature adapted the aesthetic themes from the model works, such as the "three prominences". Applied in the literary context, the principle of the three prominences was that texts should demonstrate the struggle between revolutionary and reactionary forces in a stark and dichotomous manner.

Trends of promoting birth planning through art continued after Mao's death. Under Hua Guofeng, a collection of songs, short plays, and skits relating to birth control were published as a volume titled Compilation of Birth Planning Literature and Art Propaganda Materials.

=== Opening and reform (1978–1989) ===
The arrest of Jiang Qing and the other members of the Gang of Four in 1976, and especially the reforms initiated at the Third Plenum of the Eleventh National Party Congress Central Committee in December 1978, led writers to take up their pens again. Much of the literature in what would be called the "new era" (新時期) discussed the serious abuses of power that had taken place at both the national and the local levels during the Cultural Revolution. The writers decried the waste of time and talent during that decade and bemoaned abuses that had held China back. Scar literature and reportage literature in the early 1980s presented graphic narratives of violence in the Cultural Revolution. Being patriotic, these authors wrote cynically of the political leadership that gave rise to the extreme chaos and disorder of the Cultural Revolution. A number of these themes and attitudes were also found in Fifth Generation films of directors trained after 1978, many of which were based on published novels and short stories. Some of this fiction and cinema extended the blame to the entire generation of leaders and to the political system itself.

During this period, the number of literary magazines rose sharply, and a number of them from before the Cultural Revolution were revived. Poetry also changed in its form and content. Four "misty poets", Bei Dao, Gu Cheng, Duo Duo and Yang Lian expressed themselves in deliberately obscure verse which reflected subjective realism rather than the realism of the sort promoted during the Cultural Revolution. There was a special interest in foreign works. Recent foreign literature was translated, often without carefully considering its interest for the Chinese reader. Literary magazines specializing in translations of foreign short stories became popular, especially among the young.

Some leaders in the government, literary and art circles feared change was happening too fast. The first reaction came in 1980 with calls to combat "bourgeois liberalism", a campaign that was repeated in 1981. These two difficult periods were followed by the Anti-Spiritual Pollution Campaign in late 1983.

At the same time, writers remained freer to write in unconventional styles and to treat sensitive subject matter. A spirit of literary experimentation flourished in the second half of the 1980s. Fiction writers such as Wang Meng, Zhang Xinxin, and Zong Pu and dramatists such as Gao Xingjian experimented with modernist language and narrative modes. Another group of writers—collectively said to constitute the Xungen movement—including Han Shaogong, Mo Yan, Ah Cheng, and Jia Pingwa sought to reconnect literature and culture to Chinese traditions, from which a century of modernization and cultural and political iconoclasm had severed them. Other writers such as Yu Hua, Ge Fei, and Su Tong experimented in a more avant-garde mode of writing that was daring in form and language and showed a complete loss of faith in ideals of any sort.

=== Post-Tiananmen (1989–present) ===
After Deng Xiaoping's 1992 southern tour, the culture industry of China became increasingly commercialized. Wang Shuo, a "hooligan" writer, is among the manifestation of this commercial shift, though his fiction is not without serious intent. Some writers, such as Yan Lianke, continue to take seriously the role of literature in exposing social problems; his novel Dreams of Ding Village (丁庄梦) deals with the plight of HIV-AIDS victims. As in the May Fourth Movement, women writers came to the fore. Many of them, such as Chen Ran, Wei Hui, Wang Anyi, and Hong Ying, explore female subjectivity in a radically changing society. Neo-realism is another important current in post-Tiananmen fiction, for instance in the writings of Liu Heng, Chi Li, Fang Fang, He Dun, and Zhu Wen.

According to Martin Woesler trends in contemporary Chinese literature include: 'cult literature' with Guo Jingming's Cry Me a Sad River (悲伤逆流成河), vagabond literature with Xu Zechen's Running Through Beijing (跑步穿过中关村) Liu Zhenyun's The Pickpockets (我叫刘跃), underground literature with Mian Mian's Panda Sex (声名狼藉), divided in historicizing literature with Yu Dan's Confucius in Your Heart (《论语》心得), 'longing for something' literature such as Yi Zhongtian, and in Tibetan literature with Alai, literature of the mega cities, women's literature with Bi Shumin's Women’s Boxing (女儿拳) and The Female Psychologist (女心理师), master narratives by narrators like Mo Yan with Life and Death are Wearing Me Out (生死疲劳). Oblique social criticism is also a popular form, for example Han Han's novel His land (他的国), which was written in a surreal style opposed to the uncritical mainstream, but ranked 1st in 2009 Chinese bestseller list. Another example is Yan Ge's novel Family of Joy (我们家), which was written in Sichuanese and won the Chinese Media Group New Talent Award in 2013.

Chinese language literature also flourishes in the diaspora—in South East Asia, the United States, and Europe. According to a 2014 report from the International Publishing Association, China is the largest publisher of books, magazines and newspapers in the world by volume. In book publishing alone, some 128,800 new titles of books were published in 2005, according to the General Administration of Press and Publication. There are more than 600 literary journals across the country. Living in France but continuing to write primarily in Chinese, Gao Xingjian became the first Chinese writer to receive the Nobel Prize for Literature in 2000. In 2012, Mo Yan also received the Nobel Prize in Literature. In 2015, children's author Cao Wenxuan was awarded the Hans Christian Andersen Award, the first Chinese author to win the top international children's book prize (although several Chinese authors had previously been nominated).

Selections from Asia Weekly's 100 greatest Chinese novels of the 20th century
No. 1: The True Story of Ah Q (Call to Arms) by Lu Xun

No. 3: Rickshaw Boy by Lao She

No. 5: Fortress Besieged by Qian Zhongshu

No. 6: Ziye by Mao Dun

No. 8: Family by Ba Jin

No. 9: Tales of Hulan River by Xiao Hong

No. 10: The Travels of Lao Can by Liu E

No. 13: Officialdom Unmasked by Li Baojia

No. 16: Sinking by Yu Dafu

No. 25: Four Generations Under One Roof by Lao She

No. 27: Fate in Tears and Laughter by Zhang Henshui

No. 32: A Flower in a Sinful Sea by Zeng Pu

No. 95: Bizarre Happenings Eyewitnessed over Two Decades by Wu Jianren

=== Online literature ===
In the new millennium, online literature plays a much more important role in China than in the United States and the rest of the world. Most books are available online, where the most popular novels find millions of readers. They cost an average of 2 CNY, or roughly a tenth of the average price of a printed book. Chinese online literature, also called Chinese Web or Internet Literature, encompasses works written in the Chinese language that are created and consumed on digital platforms. Rising alongside the internet's expansion, especially with the advent of mobile reading, this literature thrives on serialized publication and scrolling-based platforms. Early milestones trace back to the late 1990s with sites like Under the Banyan Tree (榕树下) and influential works such as Cai Zhiheng's The First Intimate Contact on Taiwan's Bulletin Board System (BBS). By the 2000s, Chinese Online Literature had transformed into a major cultural phenomenon, with platforms like Qidian and Jinjiang Literature City emerging to commercialize serialized storytelling. Platforms like Qidian introduced innovative freemium models, paving the way for profitable ventures such as Yuewen Literature (China Literature Limited), formed after a merger between Tencent and Shanda Literature in 2015. Shanda Literature Ltd. is an online publishing company that claims to publish 8,000 Chinese literary works daily. These platforms cater to market demands, focusing on popular genres like fantasy and cultivation fiction while offering flexible contracts for authors. Writers are paid either through royalties or salaries tied to daily output, turning online literature into a viable career for some. Authors like Tang Jia San Shao, for example, have earned millions from writing and adaptations of their works. Chinese online literature today remains sustained by a user-driven economy where readers actively engage with and influence writers through comments, ratings, and monetary gifts. Fandoms play a significant role, often steering story directions and motivating authors to stay consistent with updates. Internationally, platforms such as Wuxiaworld and Webnovel have brought Chinese genres like Xianxia and Wuxia to a global audience, leveraging translation teams and machine learning tools. Although AI-assisted translation shows promise, debates persist regarding its ethics and artistry compared to human efforts. Chinese online literature has also been the center of debates on censorship, especially within the topic of Danmei.

=== Book market ===
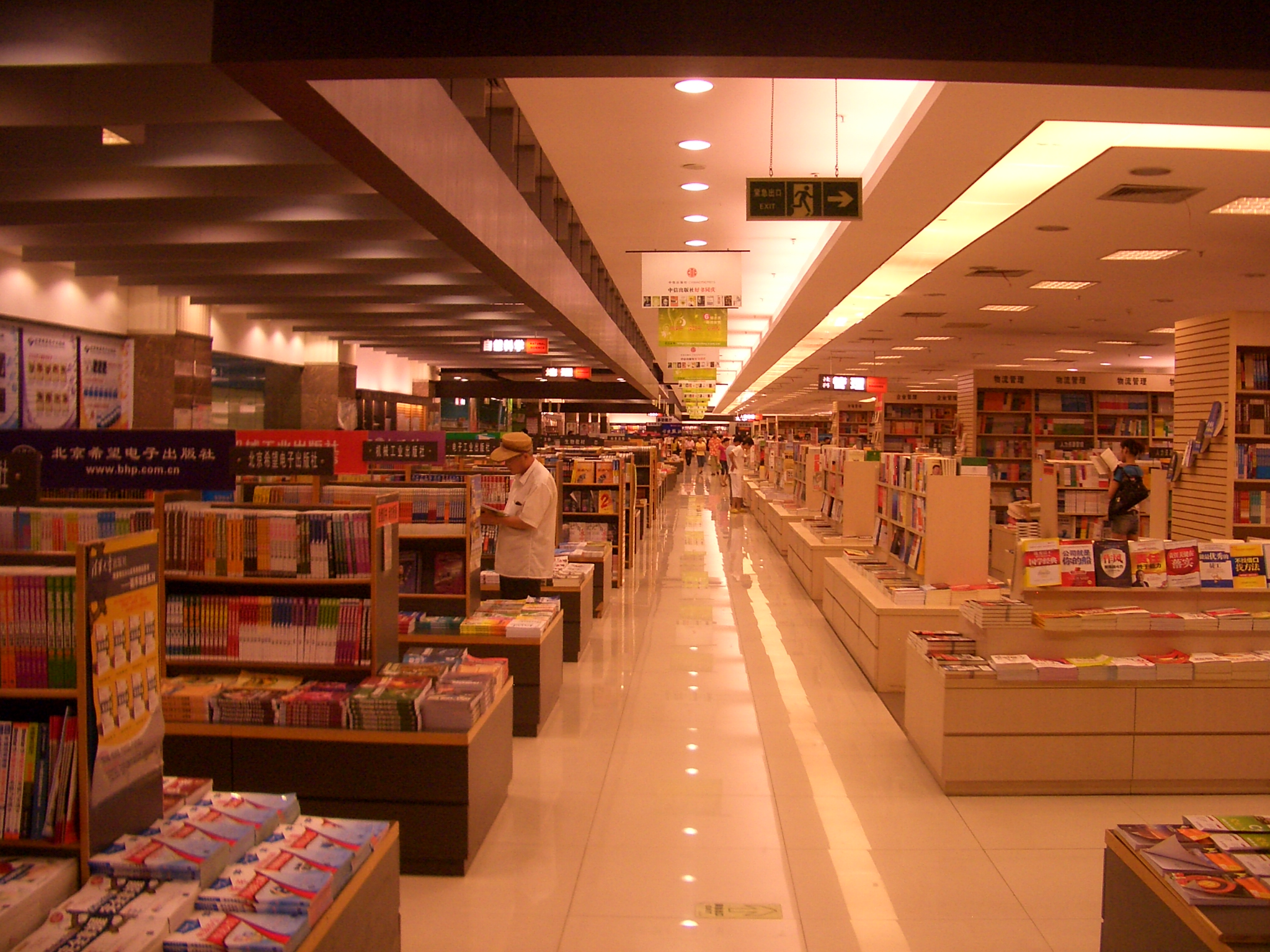
Inside Chongwen Book City, a large bookstore in Wuhan

China buys multiple foreign book rights; nearly 16 million copies of the sixth book of the Harry Potter series were sold in Chinese translation. As China Book Review reported, the rights to 9,328 foreign titles – including a number of children's books – went to China in 2007. China was nominated as a Guest of Honour at the Frankfurt Bookfair in 2009.

The book market in China traditionally orders books during book fairs, because the country lacks a national book ordering system. In 2006, 6.8 million titles were sold, not including an unknown number of banned titles, bootleg copies and underground publishing factories. Seven percent of all publishers are located in Shanghai. Because the industry lacks a national distribution system, a number of titles from publishers in the provinces can only be found there.

The central publishing houses belonging to ministries or (other) government institutions have their main seat at Beijing (40 percent of all publishers). Most regional publishing houses are situated in the capitals of the provinces. Universities also have associated presses. Private publishing is tolerated. 220,000 books were published in 2005. Among 579 publishers—almost five times more than thirty years ago—225 are supervised by ministries, commissions or the army; 348 are controlled by agencies; and six are even more independent. On the other hand, 100,000 private bookstores bring in the half of the income of the book industry.

China's state-run General Administration of Press and Publication (新聞出版總署) screens all Chinese literature intended to be sold on the open market. The GAPP has the legal authority to screen, censor, and ban any print, electronic, or Internet publication in China. Because all publishers in China are required to be licensed by the GAPP, that agency also has the power to deny people the right to publish, and completely shut down any publisher who fails to follow its dictates. As a result, the ratio of official to unlicensed books is said to be 2:3. According to a report in ZonaEuropa, there are more than 4,000 underground publishing factories around China. The Chinese government continues to hold public book burnings on unapproved yet popular "spiritual pollution" literature, though critics claim this spotlight on individual titles only helps fuel book sales. A number of new-generation Chinese authors who were targeted by such government action have been subsequently published in English and found success in western literary markets, such as Wei Hui's Shanghai Baby, Anchee Min's controversial memoir Red Azalea, Time magazine banned-book covergirl Chun Sue's Beijing Doll, and Mian Mian's Candy. Online bestseller Ghost Blows Out the Light had to be rewritten to remove references to the supernatural before it could be released in print.

=== Impact of translation on modern and contemporary Chinese writers ===
Translated literature has long played an important role in modern China. Some writers, such as Lu Xun, Yu Dafu, Ba Jin and others were literary translators themselves, and multiple present day writers in China, such as the Nobel laureate Mo Yan, listed translated works as sources of enlightenment and inspiration.

== Survey books about Chinese literature ==
Modern survey books about Chinese literature appeared around the turn of the 20th century.

The first two known survey books about Chinese literature were published by Japanese authors in the Japanese language. Kojō Tandō wrote the 700 page Shina bungakushi (支那文学史; "History of Chinese Literature"), published in 1897. Sasakawa Rinpū wrote the second ever such book in 1898, also called Shina bungakushi.

The first such book in English was A History of Chinese Literature, by Herbert Giles, published in 1901. 1904's Zhongguo wenxue shi by Lin Chuanjia was the first such survey book in Chinese. Lin Quanjia was inspired by a 1903 translation of Sasakawa's book.

The Cambridge History of Chinese Literature, edited by Kang-i Sun Chang and Stephen Owen, is a fundamental contemporary 2-volumes set work published in 2010 by the Cambridge University Press.

Studies in history of the modern Chinese literature from the 17th century to 21st century were published in 2017 by the Harvard University Press as a fourth volume of new literary history series. The book A New Literary History of Modern China, edited by David Der-wei Wang, contains multiple scholarly essays and articles in time-line order.

== Contemporary Chinese literature in translation ==
Chinese literature is increasingly available in translation- there are now several well-established websites sharing information, for example, Paper Republic, Writing Chinese, Chinese Short Stories, My Chinese Books, Chinese Books for Young Readers.

In 2005, the Chinese government started a sponsoring program for translations of government-approved Chinese works, which has already resulted in more than 200 books being translated from Chinese into other languages.

== Selected modern Chinese writers ==
- Ba Jin (巴金) (1904–2005)
- Bei Dao (北島) (1949—)
- Bing Xin (冰心) (1900–1999)
- Can Xue (殘雪) (1953–)
- Cao Wenxuan (曹文轩) (1955-)
- Cao Yu (曹禺) (1910–1996)
- Eileen Chang (張愛玲) (1920–1995)
- Chen Zhongshi (陳忠實) (1942–2016)
- Chiung Yao (琼瑶) (1938—)
- Cong Weixi (從維熙) (1933–2019)
- Feng Zikai (豐子愷) (1898–1975)
- Gao Xingjian (高行健) (1940–)
- Guo Moruo (郭沫若) (1892–1978)
- He Qifang (何其芳) (1912–1977)
- Hu Shih (胡適) (1891–1962)
- Jia Pingwa (賈平凹) (1952—)
- Jidi Majia (吉狄馬加) (1961–)
- Jin Yong (金庸) (1924–2018) (Pen name of Louis Cha Leung-yung)
- Lao She (老舍) (1897–1966)
- Liang Qichao (梁啟超) (1873–1929)
- Liang Shiqiu (梁實秋) (1903–1987)
- Lin Haiyin (林海音) (1918–2001)
- Lin Yutang (林語堂) (1895–1976)
- Liu Cixin (刘慈欣) (1963—)
- Liu E (劉鶚) (1857–1909)
- Lu Xun (魯迅) (1881–1936)
- Ma Jian (馬建) (1953—)
- Mao Dun (茅盾) (1896–1981)
- Mo Yan (莫言) (1955—)
- Qian Zhongshu (錢鍾書) (1910–1988)
- Qiu Miaojin (邱妙津) (1969–1995)
- Qu Bo (writer) (曲波) (1922–2002)
- Sanmao (author) (三毛) (1943–1991)
- Shen Congwen (沈從文) (1902–1988)
- Shi Tiesheng (史鐵生) (1951–2010)
- Su Manshu (蘇曼殊) (1894–1918)
- Su Tong (蘇童) (1963—)
- Tian Han (田漢) (1898–1968)
- Tie Ning (鐵凝) (1957—)
- Wang Guowei (王國維) (1877–1927)
- Wang Tao (王韜) (1828–1897)
- Wang Xiaobo (王小波) (1952–1997)
- Wang Zengqi (汪曾祺) (1920–1997)
- Wen Yiduo (聞一多) (1899–1946)
- Xiao Hong (萧红) (1911–1942)
- Xu Dishan (許地山) (1893–1941)
- Xu Zhimo (徐志摩) (1896–1936)
- Yan Fu (嚴復) (1853–1924)
- Yan Lianke (阎连科) (1958–)
- Yang Mu (楊牧) (1940–2020)
- Ye Shengtao (葉聖陶) (1894–1988)
- Yu Dafu (郁達夫) (1896–1945)
- Yu Hua (余华) (1960-)
- Zhang Xianliang (張賢亮) (1936–2014)
- Zhang Xinxin (张辛欣) (1953-)
- Zhang Zao (張棗) (1962–2010)
- Zhu Ziqing (朱自清) (1898–1948)

== Writers of Chinese heritage who write in other languages ==
Chinese writers writing in English:
See also List of Asian-American writers, Chinese American literature

- Ha Jin (哈金) (1956—)
- Chiang Yee (1903–1977)
- Amy Tan (譚恩美) (1952–)
- Yiyun Li (1972-)
- Qiu Xiaolong (1953-)
- Tao Lin (1983–)
- Xiaolu Guo (1973-)

Chinese writers writing in French:

- Chen Jitong (陳季同) (1852–1907)
- François Cheng (程抱一) (1929—)
- Dai Sijie (戴思傑) (1954—)
- Shan Sa (山颯) (1972—)

== See also ==
- Censorship in the People's Republic of China
- Chen prophecy
- Chinese classic texts
- Chinese culture
- Chinese dictionary
- Chinese language
- Chinese mythology
- List of Chinese authors
- List of Chinese quotations
- List of libraries in China
- List of poems in Chinese or by Chinese poets
- Literature of Hong Kong
- Taiwanese literature
- Tea classics
- Women in Chinese literature
