= Wenjingtang congshu =

Chinese collectaneum

Wenjingtang congshu (simplified Chinese: 问经堂丛书; traditional Chinese: 問經堂叢書; pinyin: Wénjīngtáng cóngshū; Wade–Giles: Wen-ching-t'ang ts'ung-shu) is a Chinese collectaneum (congshu).

== Introduction ==
The collection was compiled and published during the Qing dynasty by Sun Fengyi (孙冯翼). Sun assembled 18 texts with a total length of 31 juan. The collection mainly contains old, scattered writings that were compiled by Sun and others such as Sun Xingyan (孙星衍), especially works from the Han dynasty period.

Among the works compiled by Sun are: Yiyi kaoyi (易義考逸), Zixia Yizhuan (子夏易傳), Shennong bencao jing (神農本草經), Yizishu (逸子書), Shiben (世本), Shifa (諡法), Sanlitu (三禮圖), Huainan wanbi shu (淮南萬畢術), Huanglan (皇覽), and other books.

Many of these works have long been lost. For example, Huanglan, compiled by Wang Xiang (王象) and others from the state of Cao Wei during the Three Kingdoms period, is considered the first systematic encyclopedia of China.

The following section provides an overview of the contents of the series (following Chinaknowledge):

== Overview ==
- Yiyi kaoyi 易義考逸, 1 juan, (Qing) Sun Fengyi 孫馮翼 (comp.)
- Zixia Yizhuan 子夏易傳, 1 juan, (Zhou) Bu Shang 卜商 (子夏 Zixia); (Qing) Sun Fengyi 孫馮翼 (comp.), Zang Yong 臧庸 (narr.)
- Ma-Wang yiyi 馬王易義, 1 juan, (Han) Ma Rong 馬融; (Wei) Wang Su 王肅; (Qing) Zang Yong 臧庸 (comp.)
- Yili sangfu Ma-Wang zhu 儀禮喪服馬王注, 1 juan, (Han) Ma Rong 馬融; (Wei) Wang Su 王肅; (Qing) Zang Yong 臧庸 (comp.)
- Yugong dili guzhu kao 禹貢地理古注考, 1 juan, (Qing) Sun Fengyi 孫馮翼
- Shirenzhu 釋人注, 1 juan, (Qing) Sun Fengyi 孫馮翼
- Maoshi Ma-Wang wei 毛詩馬王微, 4 juan, (Qing) Zang Yong 臧庸
- Mingtang kao 明堂考, 3 juan, (Qing) Sun Xingyan 孫星衍
- Zhengshi yishu 鄭氏遺書, 9 juan, (Han) Zheng Xuan 鄭玄; (Qing) Wang Fu 王復 (comp.), Wu Yi 武億 (comm.)
- Bo wujing yiyi 駁五經異義, 1 juan
- Buyi 補遺, 1 juan
- Zhengaomang 箴膏肓, 1 juan
- Qifeiji 起廢疾, 1 juan
- Famoshou 發墨守, 1 juan
- Zhengzhi Buyi 鄭志, 3 juan; 補遺, 1 juan, (Wei) Zheng Xiaotong 鄭小同 (comp.)
- Erya Han zhu 爾雅漢注, 3 juan, (Qing) Zang Yongtang 臧鏞堂 (臧庸 Zang Yong, comp.)
- Shuowen zhengzi 說文正字, 2 juan, (Qing) Wang Yu 王瑜, Sun Fengyi 孫馮翼
- Jiangning jinshi daifang lu 江寧金石待訪錄, 4 juan, (Qing) Sun Fengyi 孫馮翼
- Shen Nong bencao jing 神農本草經, 3 juan, (Cao-Wei) Wu Pu 吳普 et al.; (Qing) Sun Xingyan 孫星衍, Sun Fengyi 孫馮翼 (comp.)
- Shangzi (Shangjunshu) 商子 (商君書), 5 juan, (Zhou) Shang Yang 商鞅; (Qing) Sun Xingyan 孫星衍, Sun Fengyi 孫馮翼 (comm.)
- Shizi 尸子, 2 juan, (Zhou) Shi Jiao 尸佼; (Qing) Sun Xingyan 孫星衍 (comp.)
- Yizishu 逸子書, 10 juan, (Qing) Sun Fengyi 孫馮翼 (comp.)
- Yandanzi 燕丹子, 3 juan
- Huainan wanbi shu 淮南萬畢術, 1 juan, (Han) Liu An 劉安
- Xu Shen Huainanzi zhu 許慎淮南子注, 1 juan, (Han) Xu Shen 許慎
- Huanzi xinlun 桓子新論 (新論), 1 juan, (Han) Huan Tan 桓譚
- Dianlun 典論, 1 juan, (Cao-Wei) Cao Pi 曹丕 (魏文帝 Emperor Wen)
- Huanglan 皇覽, 1 juan, (Cao-Wei) Liu Shao 劉邵, Wang Xiang 王象
- Sima Biao Zhuangzi zhu 司馬彪莊子注; Zhuangzi zhu kaoyi 莊子注考逸, 1 juan, (Jin) Sima Biao 司馬彪
- Lienü shi bing xu 列女詩并序, 1 juan, (Qing) Huang Shaofeng 黃紹鳳
- Shiben 世本, 1 juan, (Han) Song Zhong 宋衷 (comm.); (Qing) Sun Fengyi 孫馮翼 (comp.)
- Shifa 謚法, 3 juan, (Han) Liu Xi 劉熙; (Jin) Kong Chao 孔晁 (comm.); (Qing) Sun Fengyi 孫馮翼 (comp.)
- Sanlitu 三禮圖, 3 juan, (Qing) Sun Fengyi 孫馮翼 (comp.)
- Mengzi Liu zhu 孟子劉注, 1 juan, (Han) Liu Xi 劉熙; (Qing) Song Xiangfeng 宋翔鳳; Sun Fengyi 孫馮翼 (comp.)
- Jingdian jilin 經典集林, 32 juan, (Qing) Hong Yixuan 洪頤煊 (comp.)
- Guicang 歸藏, 1 juan
- Chunqiu jueyu 春秋決獄, 1 juan, (Han) Dong Zhongshu 董仲舒
- Shiqu lilun 石渠禮論, 1 juan, (Han) Dai Sheng 戴聖
- Sangfu bianchu 喪服變除, 1 juan, (Han) Dai Sheng 戴聖
- Wujing tongyi 五經通義, 1 juan, (Han) Liu Xiang 劉向
- Wujing yaoyi 五經要義, 1 juan, (Han) Liu Xiang 劉向
- Liuyilun 六藝論, 1 juan, (Han) Zheng Xuan 鄭玄
- Chunqiu tudi ming 春秋土地名, 1 juan, (Jin) Jing Xiangfan 京相璠
- Jizhong suoyu 汲冢瑣語, 1 juan
- Chu-Han chunqiu 楚漢春秋, 1 juan, (Han) Lu Jia 陸賈
- Maolingshu 茂陵書, 1 juan
- Bielu 別錄, 1 juan, (Han) Liu Xiang 劉向
- Qilüe 七略, 1 juan, (Han) Liu Xin 劉歆
- Shuwang benji 蜀王本紀, 1 juan, (Han) Yang Xiong 揚雄
- Han Wu gushi 漢武故事, 1 juan, (Han) Ban Gu 班固
- Zheng Xuan biezhuan 鄭玄別傳, 1 juan
- Linhaiji 臨海記, 1 juan
- Zisizi 子思子, 1 juan, (Zhou) Kong Ji 孔伋 (子思 Zisi)
- Gongsun nizi 公孫尼子, 1 juan, (Zhou) Gongsun Ni 公孫尼
- Lulianzi 魯連子, 1 juan, (Zhou) Lu Zhong 魯仲
- Taigong jingui 太公金匱, 1 juan, (Zhou) Lü Wang 呂望 (齊太公 Qi Taigong)
- Fan Shengzhi shu 氾勝之書, 1 juan, (Han) Fan Shengzhi 氾勝之
- Huangdi wen Xuannü bingfa 黃帝問玄女兵法, 1 juan
- Lingxian 靈憲, 1 juan, (Han) Zhang Heng 張衡
- Huntianyi 渾天儀, 1 juan, (Han) Zhang Heng 張衡
- Shi Kuang zhan 師曠占, 1 juan
- Fanzi jiran 范子計然, 1 juan
- Mengshu 夢書, 1 juan
- Baizetu 白澤圖, 1 juan
- Dijingtu 地鏡圖, 1 juan
- Han zhi shuidao kaozheng 漢志水道考證, 4 juan, (Qing) Hong Yixuan 洪頤煊
- Erju jiuhe kao 二渠九河考, 1 juan, (Qing) Sun Fengyi 孫馮翼. Tu 圖, 1 juan
- Guanzhong shuidao ji 關中水道記, 4 juan, (Qing) Sun Fengyi 孫馮翼

== Bibliography ==
- Li Xueqin 李学勤, and Lü Wenyu 吕文郁 (eds.): Siku da cidian 四庫大辭典. 2 vols. Jilin daxue chubanshe, Changchun 1996 (vol. 2, p. 2081b)
