= Huoshu =

Fantastical beast in Chinese tradition

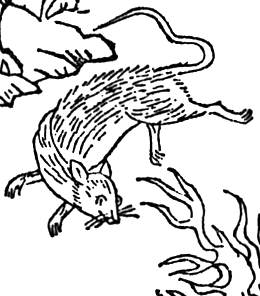
Fire rat depicted in Japanese woodblock print. ―Terajima Ryōan, Wakan sansai zue

The huoshu or huo shu (火鼠), meaning fire rat or fire mouse, is a fantastical beast in Chinese tradition.

The huoshu is said to dwell inside fire within incombustible trees growing in mountains in southern China. Cloth woven from its hair is said to became clean when burnt, and is thus equated with the item known as huo huan bu (火浣布) or "fire-laundered cloth", (Note: The rendition "fire-laundered cloth" by Kazuo Enoki is preferred here, over Unschuld's "cloths washed with fire" and other translation.) which is thought in reality to have been a type of asbestos cloth.

== Attestations ==
According to the Shenyi Jing (神異經, "Book of Gods and Strange Things") purported from the Han period, (Note: Attributed to Dongfang Shuo of Han, but this is considered pseudepigraphic, and the work apparently dates to the JIn or later period.) of which there are different redactions, the "Fire Mountain[s]" in the south measure 40 li in length, where there grows "unincineratable trees" (bu jin mu 不燼木, cf. § Ashless wood below). These keep burning day and night, yet the fire will not wax when windy nor extinguish in rain. Within such fire dwells a mouse. It weighs 100 jin/ catties (var. 1000 catties). (Note: Ancient weight differs from modern. 1 jin was 250 grams (8.8 oz) in the Han dynasty period.), and has hairs 2 chi long, (Note: The chi, or the Chinese foot, measured 23 cm in the Han dynasty period.), fine white hair, like silk. It dies if water is poured on it, and by weaving its hair into cloth, any filth or grime on it will be cleaned when burnt by fire. (Note: Yiwen leiju 藝文類聚, quoting from Shenyi jing.) (Note: Wakan sansai zue 和漢三才図会 quoting from Shenyi jing.)

The "Fire Mountain[s]" in the foregoing tract has been identified with the "Mountain of Flame" (炎火之山) of mythic Kunlun according to the Soushen ji (捜神記, "In Search of the Supernatural"). According to this work, the mountain's beast are the source of hair for making the "fire-laundered cloth".

There is also the huo guang shou (火光獸) or literally "fire light beast" according to the Shizhou ji (十洲記; "Records of the Ten Islands Within the Sea"), which lists it as fauna of Yan zhou (炎洲, one of legendary ten island-provinces), describing it as rat-like and rat-sized, with hairs 3 or 4 cun long. (Note: A cun is a tenth of chi, or Chinese foot, explained above. Thus 1 cun = 2.3 cm in the Han period, shy of 1 inch.) This is also assumed to be another description of whatever animal that supposedly yielded fireproof cloth.

Another attestation occurs in Ge Hong's Baopuzi (抱朴子) which places in Nanhai (South China Sea?) the (volcanic) "Xiao Hill" (蕭丘) (Note: The parenthetical "[volcanic}" supplied in Neeham's quote of Laufer's translation: The hill is transcribed as "Hsiao Chhiu" 粛邱.) measured 1000 li square, igniting in spring and extinguishing in autumn. Here grew plants and the white rat (白鼠) weighing several catties, with hair 3 cun long, immune to burning. The mountain's flowers, bark, and rodent hair yielded 3 types of fireproof cloth (huo huan bu ). (Note: Or Wade-Giles: huo wan pu.) (Note: Yiwen leiju 藝文類聚, quoting from Baopuzi.)

The fire rat resided in the Rinan commandery in present-day Vietnam, according to the Wu li (呉録 "Record of Wu"). (Note: Yamaoka elaborates as collectively the nine commanderies of Rinan, which in the present-day is in Northern Vietnam around Gulf of Tonkin and Hainan Island,) but belonged to the Chinese kingdom of Wu in the past.

The number figures given in these treatises may be rhetorical (hyperbolic). In one account above, the so-called rat weighed a massive 1000 catties (anciently 250 kilograms (550 lb)), as much a large mammal. (Note: Okutsu calculates the modern-day 1000 catties to be 600 kilograms (1,300 lb), as much as a polar bear.) At the modest end, it was said to weigh several catties.

According to Sui shu xiyu chuan (隋書西域傳; "Accounts on the Western Regions in the Book of Sui"), during the reign of Emperor Yang of Sui, fire rat fur was brought back by envoys returning from the Sogdian city-state Shi Guo (史国)) or Kesh, the present-day Shahrisabz, Uzbekistan.

== Early modern era ==
Whereas Li Shizhen, the compiler of the pharmaceutical Bencao Gangmu wrote (Note: That is to say he only gives a brief entry prefaced by "Li Shizhen states" and names no outside sources.) that the beast occurred in the Western Region as well as "Fire Province" of the "Southern Seas" or Nanhai Houzhou, i.e., volcanic islands in a corridor of Southeast Asia. It is possible to parse the passage to read so that "Fire Province" of the Western Region is meant here as well, which is identifiable as Uyghur state of Qocho, near Turfan in modern-day Xinjiang Autonomous Region. (Note: The name Huozhou does mean "Fire Province" as well, but Huozhou is also the phoentic transliteration of the latter part of "Qara Qojha" (var. of Qocho).) Note this coincides with Henry Yule's identification of Chingintalas as Qocho, being the locale where Marco Polo witnessed the asbestos mine.

Li Shizen was the opinion that in these locals, where wildfires lasted spring to summer, it was not only the fur of the fire rat here, but also barks and skins of trees and grasses/forbs that could be woven into "cloths washed with fire". (cf. § Fire-laundered cloth). But Li also categorized the "ashless wood" ( bu hui mu 不灰木) to be a mineral (asbestos), and discussed it under the stones section, and though Li did not list its use as cloth, the "ashless wood" has elsewhere been equated with the "unincineratable wood" relating to the "fire-laundered cloth". (cf. § Ashless wood).

== Early Japanese literature ==
The creature, pronounced kaso, hinezumi or hi no nezumi in Japanese, is of particular interest in classical Japanese literary studies since its pelt-robe is demanded by the Princess Kaguya in The Tale of the Bamboo Cutter, and also mentioned in the Genji Monogatari.

The Wamyō Ruijushō (mid 10th cent.) (Note: Book 18, under "hairs" .) gives the Japanese pronunciation as hinezumi (比禰須三; lit. 'fire rat'), and quotes from the Shenyi jing.

In The Tale of the Bamboo Cutter, the historical personage Abe no Miushi appears as one of the suitors of Princess Kaguya, and he is assigned the task of bringing the hinezumi no kawagoromo (火鼠の裘) or kawaginu (皮衣). In Tanaka Ōhide's commentary, this is equated with the "fire-laundered cloth" of Chinese literature, quoting from the Shenyi jing as well as the Wei zhi (魏志), of the Records of the Three Kingdoms) and Shui Jing Zhu ("Commentary on the Water Classic"). (Note: Tanaka Ōhide Taketori no okina monogatari kai 竹取翁物語解 apud Kawazoe.)

In the Genji monogatari, the 17th chapter "E-awase" features a picture scroll with painted scenes from the "fire rat's pelt robe" episode of the Bamboo Cutter's Tale. There have been numerous past commentaries of the classic novel subsequently written, and one of them, the Kakaishō (河海抄) dating to the Muromachi period is an early instance where the "fire rat" is commented on citing references to the "fire-laundered cloth" in classical Chinese sources such as the Shenyi jing and the Shizhou ji.

It has been noted that the item in the Japanese tale is a piece of fur, distinguishable from the woven cloth in Chinese accounts. Also, the fur Abe managed to obtain, though fake, was of golden-blue color or golden-shining, (Note: One hypothesis is that a superior grade of yellow marten fur was gotten as a substitute of the real thing. Another observation is that blue asbestos could be derived from fibrous Riebeckite (aka crocidolite) may exhibit blue color, according to Hiroshi Yamaguchi,) whereas the "fire-laundered cloth" is supposed to be white according to Chinese sources.

== Salamander parallel ==
It has been argued that the Chinese "fire rat" has its parallel in the European fire-sprite salamander. whose lore dates to Greco-Roman times. Although asbestos was known to Romans, Pliny the Elder (d. 79AD) wrote it was a type of linen or plant, and did not consider it as animal hair or fur. Eventually, there did develop the notion in the West that salamander yielded asbestos, but this was much later, for example, in a 13th-century alchemical work. (Note: By Albertus Magnus (d. 1280), cf. infra.）) (Note: Laufer's example is much later, i.e. Barthélemy d'Herbelot (d. 1695), but d'Herbelot's entry on "salamander" draws his knowledge from Persian (Turkish-translated) sources, thus citing Lutfullah Halimi (lexicographer)'s description of the creature as like a "beech marten or marten (fouine ou martre)" except of different color, red, yellow, or green, from which can be obtained a sturdy cloth (étoffe, 'stuff') that can be tossed in fire, and cleaned, etc. d'Herbelot also cites unspecified Oriental writers as describing the salamander as lizard-like, just as they are conceived of in Europe.)

In Berthold Laufer's formulation, the salamander and asbestos cloth was tied already in antiquity by the Greeks and Romans; he thus theorized asbestos must have been something introduced by the West to China around the Han period or later. Joseph Needham reviewed this premise, and was unconvinced. (Note: Since Laufer equates salamander and cloth, the remainder of his theorizations will be discussed under § Fire-laundereed cloth.)

While the Greeks and Romans conceived of salamander as a lizard-like small creature, when the lore transmitted to the Middle East, the Arab and Persian writers treated the samandal ( الـسـمـنـدل) as a phoenix bird, or a rate, etc. Zakariya al-Qazwini (d. 1283) wrote of it as a type of rat that entered fire. Al-Damiri (d. 1405) in his Life of Animals took it to mean the phoenix. The woven cloth from this bird or its feathers had the property of being cleaned when plunged in fire. Similar description is given of the rat. And these pieces of Arab learning were (reimported back) and transmitted to medieval Europe, argued Laufer.

Whether or not that was the correct route of transmission, it is true the German polymath Albertus Magnus (d. 1280) wrote in his works that the incombustible cloth was salamander feather (Latin: pluma salamandri). Marco Polo after him recorded in his Travels his observation of the "salamander" being mined, fully recognizing it to be mineral, and refuting the notion asbestos came from animal hair.

== Fire-laundered cloth ==
The "fire-laundered cloth" after being tossed in fire and shaken drops off all its dirt and turns snow-white. according to the aforementioned Shizhou ji and like sources. Later sources such as the Biyan lu (碧巌錄, "Blue Cliff Record") quoting Yunji Qiqian (雲笈七籤, "Seven Slips of the Cloud Satchel") speak of the cloth being snow-white after being fire-laundered.

The "fire-laundered cloth" was in fact cloth woven from fibrous asbestos (aka amiantus) (Note: In Japan, inventor Hiraga Gennai during the Edo period was famous for trying to replicate using domestically mined minerals.)

The Zhao shu ("Book of Zhou") and Lie Yukou, there is given an account that King Mu of Zhou was given tributes from the Xirong western barbarians, consisting of the jade-cutting-sword and fire-launderd cloth. Laufer consider these as spurious (later fabrications). and argued prior knowledge in the West before China. Needham was not willing to concede China had been ignorant before Rome, and discussed the accounts set in the Zhou dynasty period as possibly containing a germ of ancient writings, and worth considering as evidence.

Theophrastus wrote of an ignitable mineral which resembled "rotten wood", which was arguably asbestos, though this is disputed. (Note: Theophrastus discussed salamander as a fiery creature, Theophrastus (without connection to the creature) also describes a mineral from Skapte Hyle like rotten wood (de Lapidibus "On Stones", Ch. II.17), which can be lit but will not be consumed, thought to refer to asbestos by Nathaniel Fish Moore, but interpreted as lignite by translators Carey and Richards (1956), and identified as palygorskite by Robert H. S. Robertson (1963).) As far as Needham was concerned, back in the 4th century BC, this disciple of Aristotle's disciple did not yet know of asbestos, nor did his learned Chinese contemporary who was vassal to King Goujian of Yueh. (Note: Needham (1959), p. 656: "Theophrastus in the 4th century [BC] did not know of asbestos; neither did Chi Yen". Here, Chi Yen (pinyin: Ji Yan; 計𥓋) aka Chi Jan (Ji Ren; 計燃), and in Needham's volume 2, otherwise known as Chi Ni Tzu (Ji Nizi; 計倪子).)

Thus, in Needham's reckoning, knowledge of asbestos in the West dates to Roman writers from Strabo (d. 24 BC) to Pliny. (Note: Laufer apparently considered the knowledge of asbestos to date back all the way to the Greek Theophrastus (d. 287 BC), but Needham observes Theophrastus did not in fact know about it. Thus, Strabo tops the list of oldest. Theophrastus did discuss the flame-tolerant salamander.) Pliny's notion was that the fire-proof cloth was woven plant fibers from India. It can be laundered by tossing in fire, more cleanly than washing in water. It may be red normally, but burning turn it pearl colored, etc. (Note: Pliny adds there are also asbestos from Arcadia, which are iron colored.)

Ignoring the claims dating to Zhou, the oldest attestation in China of fire-laundering cloth occurs in Yu Huan's Weilüe (魏略, 3rd cent.), according to Laufer, which described the fire-laundered cloth as the specialty product of Daqin (大秦) which he takes to mean the Roman Orient. (Note: Similar accounts occur in Book of the Later Han Book 100.18, etc.) However, In the Wei Records of the Records of the Three Kingdoms, it is stated that during the time of Wei's third emperor Cao Fang (also styled Qi wang 斉王), in the year Jingchu 3 (237 AD), there arrived from the "Western territories" a tribute of "fire-cloth" (火布, considered to mean "fire-laundered cloth"), It is not clear what the "Western Territories" mean exactly, and modern scholars appear to favor "Central Asia". The first Emperor Wen of Wei (Cao Pi) had questioned the authenticity of such cloth, as set down in his own authored work Dianlun ("Canonical Essays" or "Authoritative Discourses"), the essays were set in stone by the second emperor, but after foreigners brought such cloth, this particular "essay/discourse" had to be scraped off. (Note: Thus there is discrepancy on whether the third or second emperor of Wei had received the gift of the "fire cloth". It was the first emperor, Cao Pi himself who received the gift, according to Baopuzi.)

The Jin shu (晋書 "Book of Jin") of records that Emperor Fujian (d. 385) of Former Han received a gift of the fire-laundered cloth from Tianzhu (India) polity, then under the reign of Chandragupta II.

According to the Liu Song dynasty Book of Song, during the Daming era (657–664), the Sute (粟特, namely Sogdiana) sent envoys who brought gifts of "live lion, fire-laundered cloth, and sweats blood horse (cf. Ferghana horse)".

== Ashless wood ==
Regarding the bu jin mu (不尽木・不燼木・不烬木) or "unincinerable wood" connected with "fire-laundered cloth", the "bu hui mu" (不灰木) or "ashless wood" is considered synonymous according to a mythographer's dictionary.

The topic of bu hui mu is broached in the Bencao Gangmu, Book 9, under the Part on Stones; however, its uses described there do not include use as fabric. In the explanation taken from Su Song, it is a type of stone that occurs in Shangdang Commandery, now found widely found in the mountains of Lu and Ze provinces. (Note: Lu province (area around present-day Changzhi) shares some counties with the Shangdang Commandery, while Ze province (around Jincheng) lies to its south.) The stone is white and looks like rotting wood, but burning it produces no ash, hence the name.

The compiler Li Shizhen registers his own opinion (similar to Baopuzi above) that there is actually a stone type and tree type. The stone type is harder and heavier, and when steeped in naphtha/petroleum (石腦油) and wrapped in paper, it serves as a lamp which can be lit the whole night long without burning down into ashes.

The tree type of ashless wood, according to Fu Chen's Qi di ji (伏深『齊地記』), was known by the name "wood that conquers fire" (shenghuo mu; 勝火木) and occurred in Dongwu cheng/city (東武城, or Dong Wu Cheng county). (Note: Suzuki's marginal note insists "Dongwucheng" (東武城) were "cities along the Wei River (維水) south of Gaomi city, Shandong." which is consistent with the location given by the Taiping Huanyu Ji , only more precise. However, Unschuld tr.'s companion geographical dictionary gives "Dong wu cheng" as the name of a county, i.e. 东武城县, whose seat was near present-day Qinghe County, Hebei) And the tree type according to the Taiping Huanyu Ji (太平寰宇記) occurred in Jiao zhou, and was metal-rod like, (Note: Or, according to Suzuki, the wood was used as mold in metal casting.) though it had lobes like cattail leaves, and when bunched up into torches, were so long lasting they became known as "torches for a myriad years" (万年火把). Li Shizhen himself bought such a torch, and claims it had burned down by only one or two cun after a whole night.
