= Lianshan (book) =

Ancient Chinese divination text from the Western Zhou dynasty

- Traditional Chinese: 連山
- Simplified Chinese: 连山
Transcriptions
Standard Mandarin
- Hanyu Pinyin: Lián Shān

Lianshan (translated as Joint Mountains or Link to the Mountains) was an ancient Chinese divination text from the Western Zhou dynasty (1046–771 BC). The text was mentioned in classic works such as the Rites of Zhou as one of the three major divination systems (三易), along with I Ching and Guicang.

Unlike the I Ching, Lianshan is largely a lost work. Throughout history, partial versions of the Lianshan were claimed to have survived or have resurfaced, such as during the 6th century, although their authenticity are now questioned by modern scholars. "Fragments" of Lianshan were reconstructed by the Qing dynasty scholar Ma Guohan (馬國翰, 1794–1857) through quotations from other texts, although modern scholars also doubt their faithfulness to the original. During the Qing, other "sets of fragments" of Lianshan were also compiled by other writers, such as Guanhui Daoren (觀頮道人) and Wang Mo (王謨, 1731–1817).

Guicang was likewise lost early, until a Qin manuscript of the text was discovered in 1993.
