= Prophecy =

Message claimed to be from a deity

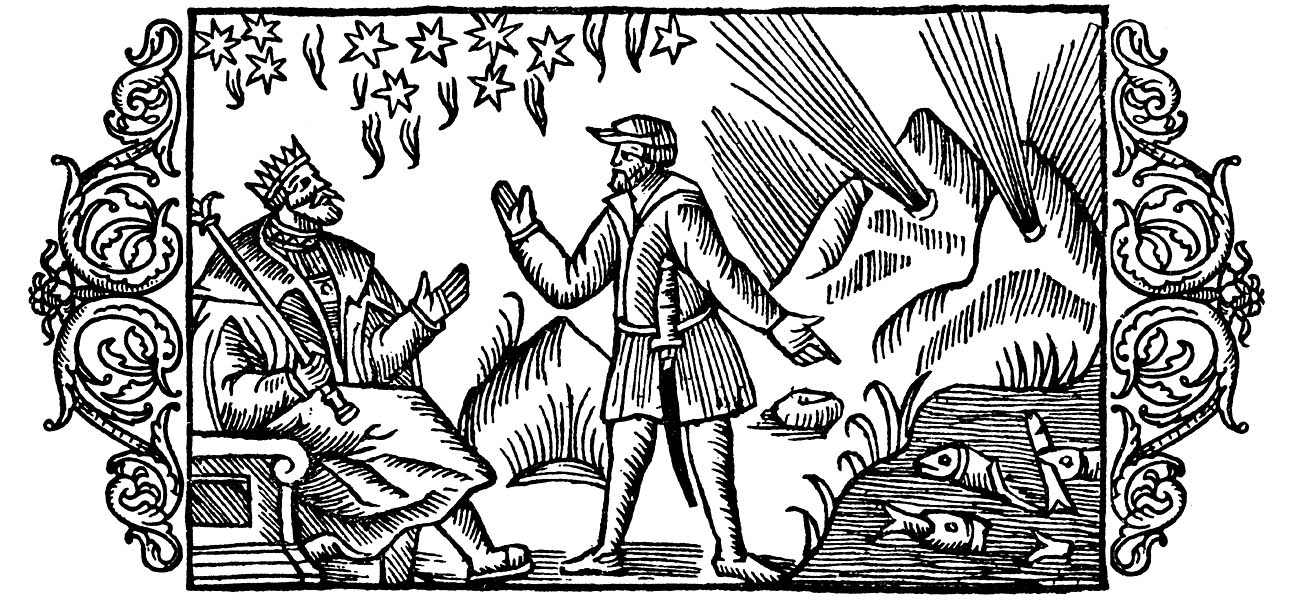
16th century woodcut of a soothsayer delivering a prophecy to a king, deriving it from stars, fishes, and noises from the mountains

In religion, mythology, and fiction, a prophecy is a message that has been communicated to a person (typically called a prophet) by a supernatural entity. Prophecies are a feature of many cultures and belief systems and usually contain divine will or law, or preternatural knowledge, for example of future events. They can be revealed to the prophet in various ways depending on the religion and the story, such as visions, or direct interaction with divine beings in physical form. Stories of prophetic deeds sometimes receive considerable attention and some have been known to survive for centuries through oral tradition or as religious texts.

== Etymology ==
The English noun "prophecy", in the sense of "function of a prophet" appeared from about 1225, from Old French profecie (12th century), and from prophetia, Greek propheteia "gift of interpreting the will of God", from Greek prophetes (see prophet). The related meaning, "thing spoken or written by a prophet", dates from c. 1300, while the verb "to prophesy" is recorded by 1377.

== Definitions ==
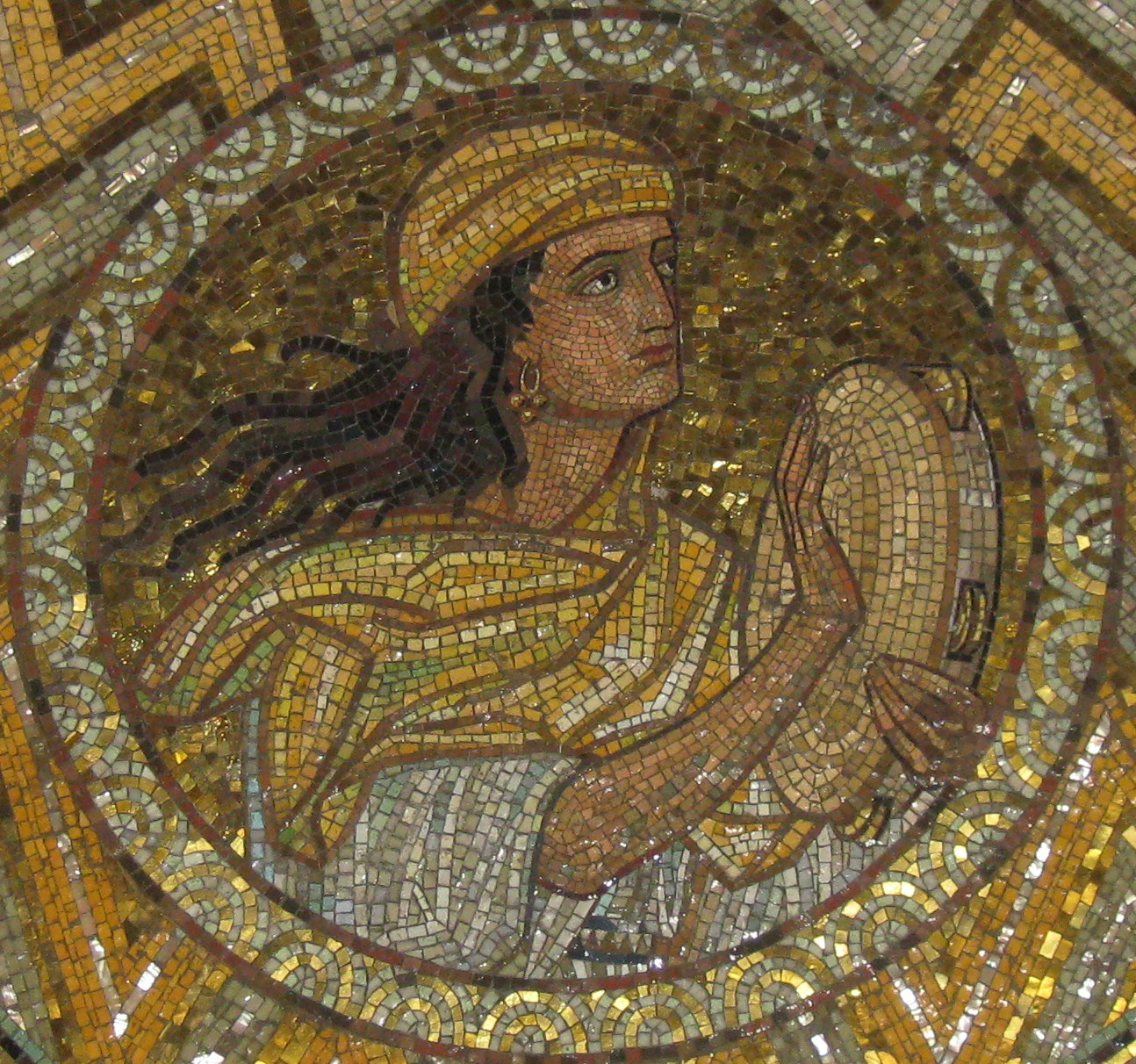
Miriam, prophetess in the Book of Exodus. 20th century mosaic in the Abbey of the Dormition

- Maimonides suggested that "prophecy is, in truth and reality, an emanation sent forth by Divine Being through the medium of the Active Intellect, in the first instance to man's rational faculty, and then to his imaginative faculty".
- The views of Maimonides closely relate to the definition by Al-Fârâbî, who developed the theory of prophecy in Islam.
- Much of the activity of Old Testament prophets involved conditional warnings rather than immutable futures. A summary of a standard Old Testament prophetic formula might run: Repent of sin X and turn to righteousness, otherwise consequence Y will occur.
- Saint Paul emphasizes edification, exhortation and comfort in a definition of prophesying.
- The Catholic Encyclopedia defines a Christian conception of prophecy as "understood in its strict sense, it means the foreknowledge of future events, though it may sometimes apply to past events of which there is no memory, and to present hidden things which cannot be known by the natural light of reason".
- According to Western esotericist Rosemary Guiley, clairvoyance has been used as an adjunct to "divination, prophecy, and magic".
- From a skeptical point of view, a Latin maxim exists: "prophecy written after the fact" (vaticinium ex eventu). The Jewish Torah already deals with the topic of the false prophet (Deuteronomy 13:2-6, 18:20-22).

== By religion or tradition ==
=== Ancient Greek religion ===
According to the playwright Aeschylus, prophecy was giving to mankind by the titan Prometheus to protect it from the violent and mercurial whims of the gods.

=== Abrahamic religions ===
==== Baháʼí Faith ====
In 1863, Bahá'u'lláh, the founder of the Baháʼí Faith, claimed to have been the promised messianic figure of all previous religions, and a Manifestation of God, a type of prophet in the Baháʼí writings that serves as intermediary between the divine and humanity and who speaks with the voice of a God. Bahá'u'lláh claimed that, while being imprisoned in the Siyah-Chal in Iran, he underwent a series of mystical experiences including having a vision of the Maid of Heaven who told him of his divine mission, and the promise of divine assistance; In Baháʼí belief, the Maid of Heaven is a representation of the divine.

==== Christianity ====
According to Walter Brueggemann, the task of prophetic (Christian) ministry is to nurture, nourish and evoke a consciousness and perception alternative to the consciousness and perception of the dominant culture. A recognized form of Christian prophecy is the "prophetic drama" which Frederick Dillistone describes as a "metaphorical conjunction between present situations and future events".

In his Dialogue with Trypho, Justin Martyr argued that prophets were no longer among Israel but were in the Church. The Shepherd of Hermas, written around the mid-2nd century, describes the way prophecy was being used within the church of that time. Irenaeus confirms the existence of such spiritual gifts in his Against Heresies. Although some modern commentators claim that Montanus was rejected because he claimed to be a prophet, a careful examination of history shows that the gift of prophecy was still acknowledged during the time of Montanus, and that he was controversial because of the manner in which he prophesied and the doctrines he propagated.

Prophecy and other spiritual gifts were somewhat rarely acknowledged throughout church history and there are few examples of the prophetic and certain other gifts until the Scottish Covenanters like Prophet Peden and George Wishart. From 1904 to 1906, the Azusa Street Revival occurred in Los Angeles, California and is sometimes considered the birthplace of Pentecostalism. This revival is well known for the "speaking in tongues" that occurred there. Some participants of the Azusa Street Revival are claimed to have prophesied. Pentecostals believe prophecy and certain other gifts are once again being given to Christians. The Charismatic Movement also accepts spiritual gifts like speaking in tongues and prophecy.

The Seventh-day Adventist Church is a denomination that traces its history to the Millerite Movement and the Great Disappointment. Seventh-day Adventists "accept the biblical teaching of spiritual gifts and believe that the gift of prophecy is one of the identifying marks of the remnant church." The church also believes Ellen G. White to be a prophet and that her writings are divinely inspired.

Since 1972, the neo-Pentecostal Church of God Ministry of Jesus Christ International has expressed a belief in prophecy. The church claims this gift is manifested by one person (the prophesier) laying their hands on another person, who receives an individual message said by the prophesier. Prophesiers are believed to be used by the Holy Ghost as instruments through whom their God expresses his promises, advice and commandments. The church claims people receive messages about their future, in the form of promises given by their God and expected to be fulfilled by divine action.

In the Apostolic-Prophetic Movement, a prophesy is simply a word delivered under the inspiration of the Holy Spirit that accurately communicates God's "thoughts and intention". The Apostolic Council of Prophetic Elders was a council of prophetic elders co-convened by C. Peter Wagner and Cindy Jacobs that included: Beth Alves, Jim Gool, Chuck Pierce, Mike and Cindy Jacobs, Bart Pierces, John and Paula Sanford, Dutch Sheets, Tommy Tenny, Heckor Torres, Barbara Wentroble, Mike Bickle, Paul Cain, Emanuele Cannistraci, Bill Hamon, Kingsley Fletcher, Ernest Gentile, Jim Laffoon, James Ryle, and Gwen Shaw. See also: New Apostolic Reformation

Latter Day Saint movement

The Latter Day Saint movement maintains that its first prophet, Joseph Smith, was visited by God and Jesus Christ in 1820. The Latter Day Saints further claims that God communicated directly with Joseph Smith on many subsequent occasions, and that following the death of Joseph Smith God has continued to speak through subsequent prophets. Joseph Smith claims to have been led by an angel to a large hill in upstate New York, where he was shown an ancient manuscript engraved on plates of gold metal. Joseph Smith claimed to have translated this manuscript into modern English under divine inspiration by the gift and power of God, and the publication of this translation are known as the Book of Mormon.

Following Smith's murder, there was a succession crisis that resulted in a great schism. The majority of Latter-day Saints believing Brigham Young to be the next prophet and following him out to Utah, while a minority returned to Missouri with Emma Smith, believing Joseph Smith Junior's son, Joseph Smith III, to be the next legitimate prophet (forming the Reorganized Church of Jesus Christ of Latter Day Saints, now the Community of Christ). Since even before the death of Joseph Smith in 1844, there have been numerous separatist Latter Day Saint sects that have splintered from the Church of Jesus Christ of Latter Day Saints. To this day, there are an unknown number of organizations within the Latter Day Saint movement, each with their own proposed prophet.

The Church of Jesus Christ of Latter-day Saints (LDS Church) is the largest Latter Day Saint body. The current Prophet/President of the LDS Church is Dallin H. Oaks. The church has, since Joseph Smith's death on June 27, 1844, held a belief that the president of their church is also a literal prophet of God. The church also maintains that further revelations claimed to have been given through Joseph Smith are published in the Doctrine and Covenants, one of the Standard Works. Additional revelations and prophecies outside the Standard Works, such as Joseph Smith's "White Horse Prophecy", concerning a great and final war in the United States before the Second Coming of Jesus Christ, can be found in other church published works.

==== Islam ====
The Arabic term for prophecy nubū'ah (Arabic: نُبُوْءَة) stems from the term for prophets, nabī (Arabic: نَبِي; pl. anbiyāʼ from nabā "tidings, announcement") who are lawbringers that Muslims believe were sent by God to every nation, bringing God's message in a language they can understand. But there is also the term rasūl (Arabic: رسول "messenger, apostle") to classify those who bring a divine revelation (Arabic: رسالة risālah "message") via an angel. Knowledge of the Islamic prophets is one of the six articles of the Islamic faith, and specifically mentioned in the Quran. Along with Muhammad, many of the prophets in Judaism (such as Noah, Abraham, Moses, Aaron, Elijah, etc.) and prophets of Christianity (Adam, Zechariah the priest, John the Baptist, Jesus Christ) are mentioned by name in the Quran.

In the sense of predicting events, the Quran contains verses believed to have predicted many events years before they happened and that such prophecies are proof of the divine origin of the Qur'an. The Qur'an itself states "Every ˹destined˺ matter has a ˹set˺ time to transpire. And you will soon come to know." ^{[Quran 6:67]} Muslims also recognize the validity of some prophecies in other sacred texts like the Bible; however, they believe that, unlike the Qur'an, some parts of the Bible have been corrupted over the years, and as a result, not all of the prophecies and verses in the Bible are accurate.

==== Judaism ====
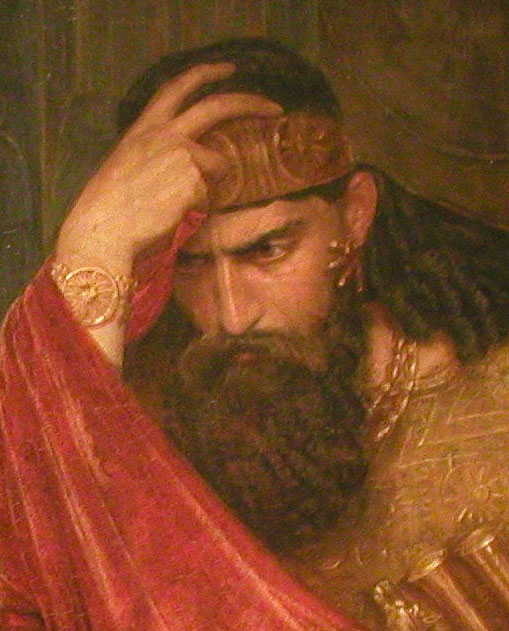
David and Saul, detail from an 1878 oil painting, Nationalmuseum, Stockholm

The Hebrew term for prophet, Navi (נביא), literally means "spokesperson"; a prophet speaks to the people as a mouthpiece of their God, and to their god on behalf of the people. "The name prophet, from the Greek meaning "forespeaker" (πρὸ being used in the original local sense), is an equivalent of the Hebrew Navi, which signifies properly a delegate or mouthpiece of another."

Sigmund Mowinckel's account of prophecy in ancient Israel distinguishes seers and prophets - both in their origins and in their functions:

According to Mowinckel, the early seer and the ecstatic prophet derived from two distinctly different social and institutional backgrounds. The seer belonged to the earliest stratum of Israelite society and was related to the priest who 'was not originally in the first instance a sacrificer, but as with the old Arabs, custodian of the sanctuary, oracle priest, "seer" and holder of the effective future-creating and future-interpreting word of power, the blessing and the curse.' [...] Ecstatic prophecy - nebiism - and temple priests were indigenous to Canaanite culture and represented elements adopted by the Israelites. With the fusion of the functions of the seer-priest with the functions of the temple-sacrificial priests and ecstatic prophets, two main groups developed: the priests occupied with cult and sacrifice [...] and the 'prophets' who 'continued the more "pneumatic" aspect of the character and work of the old "seers"' and 'were mediums of the divinely inspired "word" which was "whispered to" them, or "came to them"' [...] The prophets retained, in guild fashion, the old seer relationship to the cult [...].

According to Judaism, authentic Nevuah (נבואה, "Prophecy") got withdrawn from the world after the destruction of the first Jerusalem Temple. Malachi is acknowledged to have been the last authentic prophet if one accepts the opinion that Nechemyah died in Babylon before 9th Tevet 3448 (313 BCE).

The Torah contains laws concerning the false prophet (Deuteronomy 13:2-6, 18:20-22). Prophets in Islam, like Lot, for example, are false prophets according to Jewish standards.

In the Torah, prophecy often consisted of a conditioned warning by their God of the consequences should the society, specific communities, or their leaders not adhere to the Torah's instructions in the time contemporary with the prophet's life. Prophecies sometimes included conditioned promises of blessing for obeying their god, and returning to behaviors and laws as written in the Torah. Conditioned-warning prophecies feature in all Jewish works of the Tanakh.

Notably Maimonides (1138–1204), philosophically suggested that there once were many levels of prophecy, from the highest (such as those experienced by Moses) to the lowest (where the individuals were able to apprehend the Divine Will, but not respond or even describe this experience to others, citing for example, Shem, Eber and most notably, Noah, who, in the biblical narrative, does not issue prophetic declarations).

Maimonides, in his philosophical work The Guide for the Perplexed, outlines twelve modes of prophecy from lesser to greater degree of clarity:

1. Inspired actions
2. Inspired words
3. Allegorical dream revelations
4. Auditory dream revelations
5. Audiovisual dream revelations/human speaker
6. Audiovisual dream revelations/angelic speaker
7. Audiovisual dream revelations/Divine speaker
8. Allegorical waking vision
9. Auditory waking revelation
10. Audiovisual waking revelation/human speaker
11. Audiovisual waking revelation/angelic speaker
12. Audiovisual waking revelation/Divine speaker (that refers implicitly to Moses)

The Tanakh contains prophecies from various Hebrew prophets (55 in total) who communicated messages from God to the nation of Israel, and later to the population of Judea and elsewhere. Experience of prophecy in the Torah and the rest of Tanakh was not restricted to Jews. Nor was the prophetic experience restricted to the Hebrew language.

=== Buddhism ===
The Haedong Kosung-jon (Biographies of High Monks) records that King Beopheung of Silla desired to promulgate Buddhism as the state religion. However, officials in his court opposed him. In the fourteenth year of his reign, Beopheung's "Grand Secretary", Ichadon, devised a strategy to overcome court opposition. Ichadon schemed with the king, convincing him to make a proclamation granting Buddhism official state sanction using the royal seal. Ichadon told the king to deny having made such a proclamation when the opposing officials received it and demanded an explanation. Instead, Ichadon would confess and accept the punishment of execution, for what would quickly be seen as a forgery. Ichadon prophesied to the king that at his execution a wonderful miracle would convince the opposing court faction of Buddhism's power.

Ichadon's scheme went as planned, and the opposing officials took the bait. When Ichadon was executed on the 15th day of the 9th month in 527, his prophecy was fulfilled; the earth shook, the sun was darkened, beautiful flowers rained from the sky, his severed head flew to the sacred Geumgang Mountains, and milk instead of blood sprayed 100 feet in the air from his beheaded corpse. The omen was accepted by the opposing court officials as a manifestation of heaven's approval, and Buddhism was made the state religion in 527.

=== Chinese tradition ===
In ancient Chinese, prophetic texts are known as Chen (讖). The most famous Chinese prophecies are the I Ching (易經) and the Tui bei tu (推背圖).

=== Native American religions ===
There exists a problem in verifying most Native American prophecies, in that they remain primarily an oral tradition, and thus there is no way to cite references of where writings have been committed to paper. In their system, the best reference is an Elder, who acts as a repository of the accumulated wisdom of their tradition.

In another type of example, it is recorded that there are three Dogrib prophets who had claimed to have been divinely inspired to bring the message of Christianity's God to their people. This prophecy among the Dogrib involves elements such as dances and trance-like states.

=== Western esotericism ===
Esoteric prophecy has been claimed for, but not by, Michel de Nostredame (1503–1566), popularly referred to as Nostradamus, who claimed to be a converted Christian. It is known that he suffered several tragedies in his life, and was persecuted to some degree for his cryptic esoteric writings about the future, reportedly derived through a use of a crystal ball. Nostradamus was a French apothecary and reputed seer who published collections of foreknowledge of future events. He is best known for his book Les Propheties ("The Prophecies"), the first edition of which appeared in 1555. Since Les Propheties was published, Nostradamus has attracted an esoteric following that, along with the popularistic press, credits him with foreseeing world events. His esoteric cryptic foreseeings have in some cases been assimilated to the results of applying the alleged Bible code, as well as to other purported pseudo-prophetic works.

Most reliable academic sources maintain that the associations made between world events and Nostradamus's quatrains are largely the result of misinterpretations or mistranslations (sometimes deliberate) or else are so tenuous as to render them useless as evidence of any genuine predictive power. Moreover, none of the sources listed offers any evidence that anyone has ever interpreted any of Nostradamus's pseudo-prophetic works specifically enough to allow a clear identification of any event in advance.

== Poetry and prophecy ==
For the ancient Greeks, prediction, prophesy, and poetry were often intertwined. Prophecies were given in verse, and a word for poet in Latin is “vates” or prophet. Both poets and oracles claimed to be inspired by forces outside themselves. In ancient China, divination is regarded as the oldest form of occult inquiry and was often expressed in verse. In contemporary Western cultures, theological revelation and poetry are typically seen as distinct and often even as opposed to each other. Yet the two still are often understood together as symbiotic in their origins, aims, and purposes.

Middle English poems of a political nature are linked with Latin and vernacular prophecies. Prophecies in this sense are predictions concerning kingdoms or peoples; and these predictions are often eschatological or apocalyptic. The prophetic tradition in English derives in from Geoffrey of Monmouth's History of the Kings of Britain (1136), otherwise called "Prophecies of Merlin;" this work is prelude to numerous books devoted to King Arthur. In 18th century England, prophecy as poetry is revived by William Blake who wrote: America: A Prophecy (1783) and Europe: A Prophecy (1794).

Contemporary American poetry is also rich in lyrics about prophesy, including poems entitled Prophecy by Dana Gioia and Eileen Myles. In 1962, Robert Frost published "The Prophets Really Prophesy as Mystics the Commentators Merely by Statistics". Other modern poets who write on prophets or prophecy include Carl Dennis, Richard Wilbur, and Derek Walcott.

== Explanations ==
According to skeptics, many apparently fulfilled prophecies can be explained as coincidences, possibly aided by the prophecy's own vagueness, and others may have been invented after the fact to match the circumstances of a past event (an act termed "postdiction").

Bill Whitcomb in The Magician's Companion observes,

One point to remember is that the probability of an event changes as soon as a prophecy (or divination) exists. . . . The accuracy or outcome of any prophecy is altered by the desires and attachments of the seer and those who hear the prophecy.

Many prophets make a large number of prophecies. This makes the chances of at least one prophecy being correct much higher by sheer weight of numbers.

=== Psychology ===
The phenomenon of prophecy is not well understood in psychology research literature. Psychiatrist and neurologist Arthur Deikman describes the phenomenon as an "intuitive knowing, a type of perception that bypasses the usual sensory channels and rational intellect."

"(P)rophecy can be likened to a bridge between the individual 'mystical self' and the communal 'mystical body'," writes religious sociologist Margaret Poloma. Prophecy seems to involve "the free association that occurred through the workings of the right brain."

Psychologist Julian Jaynes proposed that this is a temporary accessing of the bicameral mind; that is, a temporary separating of functions, such that the authoritarian part of the mind seems to literally be speaking to the person as if a separate (and external) voice. Jaynes posits that the gods heard as voices in the head were and are organizations of the central nervous system. God speaking through man, according to Jaynes, is a more recent vestige of God speaking to man; the product of a more integrated higher self. When the bicameral mind speaks, there is no introspection. In earlier times, posits Jaynes, there was additionally a visual component, now lost.

Child development and consciousness author Joseph Chilton Pearce remarked that revelation typically appears in symbolic form and "in a single flash of insight." He used the metaphor of lightning striking and suggests that the revelation is "a result of a buildup of resonant potential." Pearce compared it to the earth asking a question and the sky answering it. Focus, he said, feeds into "a unified field of like resonance (and becomes) capable of attracting and receiving the field's answer when it does form."

Some cite aspects of cognitive psychology such as pattern forming and attention to the formation of prophecy in modern-day society as well as the declining influence of religion in daily life.

== See also ==
- Self-fulfilling prophecy
