= Sun Xingyan =

Qing dynasty scholar

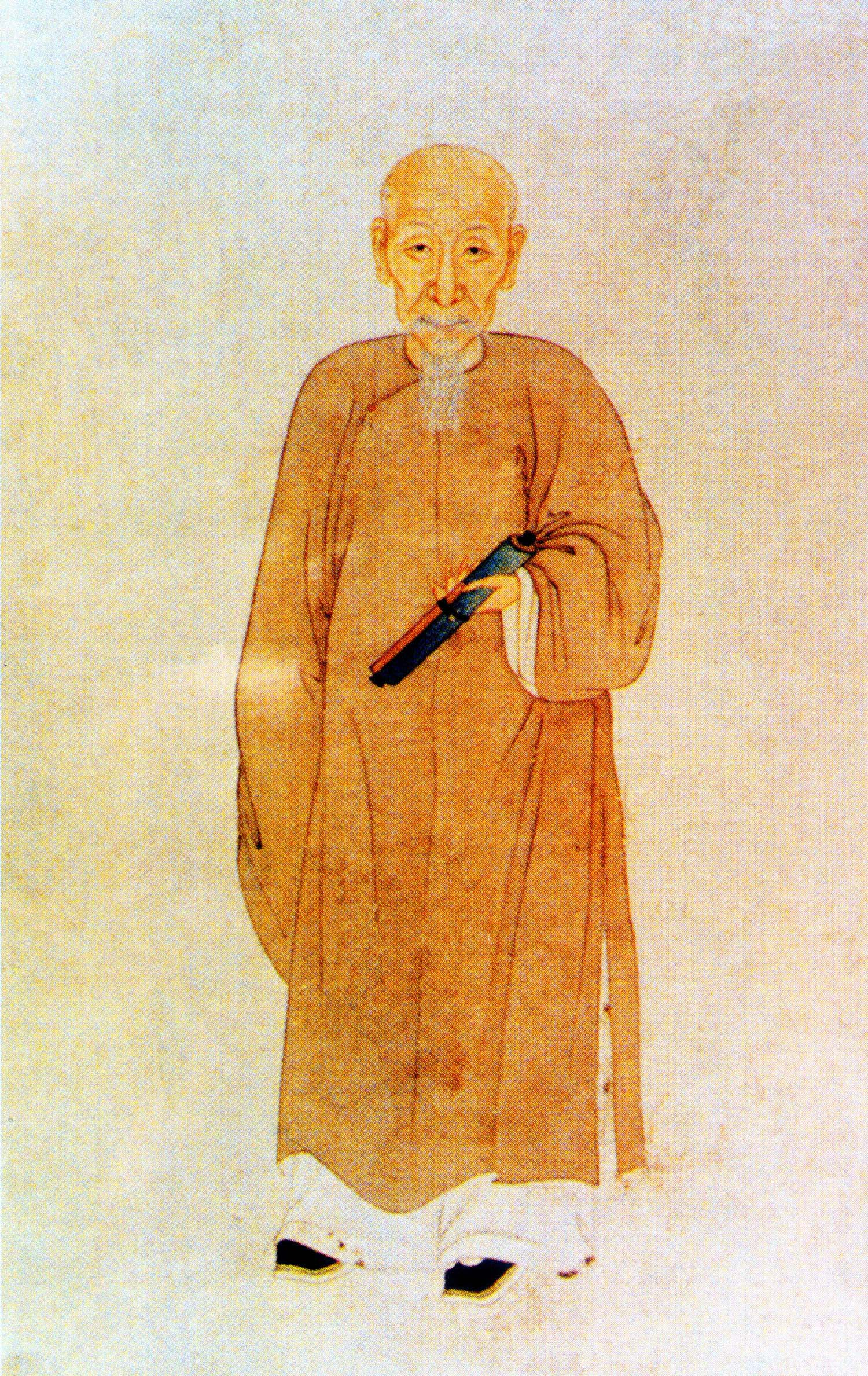
Sun Xingyan

Sun Xingyan (Chinese: 孙星衍; 1753–1818), also known as Yuanru (渊如), was a Confucian scholar and philologist during the Qing dynasty.

He was born in Yanghu (now Wujin, Jiangsu). After a brief career as a government official, Sun devoted most of his life to the study of the Confucian classics, their history, and phonology. His most influential work is his commentary on the Modern Script and Old Script Shangshu (Shangshu jinguwen zhushu 尚书今古文注疏), i.e., the Book of Documents.

== Publications ==
(Hanyu da zidian bibliography, nos. 2415–2417)

- Sun Yuanru shi wenji 孙渊如诗文集 (Sibu congkan yingyin yuan kanben 四部丛刊影印元刊本)
- Xu Guwen yuan 续古文苑 (Pingjinguan congshu 平津馆丛书)
- Huanyu fangbei lu 寰宇访碑绿 (Shangwu paiyinben 商务排印本)

Studies on the following ancient texts are listed in the bibliography of the Hanyu da zidian (abbreviated HYDZD), with references to work numbers, titles, authors, and Congshu series:

- 2 Shangshu 尚书 / Shu 书: Shangshu jinguwen zhushu 尚书今古文注疏 (Pingjinguan congshu 平津馆丛书, typeset and printed by Zhonghua shuju 1986)
- 25 Yanzi chunqiu 晏子春秋: Yanzi chunqiu yinyi 晏子春秋音 (Jingxuntang congshu 经训堂丛书)
- 66 Shi You 史游: Jijiu pian 急就篇: Jijiu zhang kaoyi 急就章考异 (Dainange congshu 岱南阁丛书)
- 77 Wuzi 吴子: Wuzi jicheng 吴子集成 (Zhuzi jicheng 诸子集成)

== See also ==
- Wenjingtang congshu

== Bibliography ==
- Tu Lien-chê: Sun Hsing-yen. In: Arthur Hummel (ed.): Eminent Chinese of the Ch'ing Period. Sun Xingyan is available for free viewing and download at the Internet Archive.
- 汉英中国哲学辞典. Kaifeng 2002
