= List of Chinese quotations =

This List of Chinese quotations is composed of quotations that are important for Chinese culture, history and politics.

== C ==
=== Cao Cao ===
Cao Cao (155–220 CE) was a warlord who rose to power towards the end of the Han dynasty and became the de facto head of the Han government. He established the foundation of the state of Cao Wei in the Three Kingdoms era.

寧我負人，毋人負我！
nìng wǒ fù rén, wú rén fù wǒ!
"I'd rather do wrong to others than allow them to do wrong to me!"
[A remark made by Cao Cao in 189 after he killed Lü Boshe's family by mistake while he was on his way to Chenliu (陳留; around present-day Kaifeng, Henan). The exact words in this quote were altered in the historical novel Romance of the Three Kingdoms. See the article on Lü Boshe for details.]

=== Confucius ===
Confucius (孔夫子; Kǒng Fū Zǐ, lit. "Master Kong," but most frequently referred to as Kongzi (孔子), traditionally 551 – 479 BCE) was a famous Chinese thinker and social philosopher, whose teachings have deeply influenced East Asian life and thought.

十五向學,三十而立,四十而不惑,五十而知天命,六十而耳順,七十而從心欲，不踰矩.
Shí wǔ xiàng xué, sān shí érlì, sì shí ér bùhuò, wǔ shí ér zhī tiānmìng, liù shí ér ěrshùn, qī shí ér cóng xīn yù, bù yú ju.
"At fifteen, I aspired to learning. At thirty, I established my stand. At forty, I had no delusions. At fifty, I knew my destiny. At sixty, I knew truth in all I heard. At seventy, I could follow the wishes of my heart without doing wrong."

學而時習之，不亦悅乎？
Xue er shi xi zhi, bu yi yue hu?
"To learn and to practice what is learned time and again is pleasure, is it not?" (Beginning sentence of the Analects)

有朋自远方来，不亦乐乎？
You peng zi yuan fang lai, bu yi le hu?
"To have friends come from afar is happiness, is it not?"

== D ==
=== Deng Xiaoping ===
Deng Xiaoping (邓小平 Dèng Xiǎopíng); 1904– 1997) was a leader in the Chinese Communist Party. Deng never held office as the head of state or the head of government, but served as the paramount leader of the People's Republic of China from the late 1970s to the early 1990s. He pioneered socialism with Chinese characteristics and reform and opening up, also known as the socialist market economy.

不管黑猫白猫，捉到老鼠就是好猫。
Bùguǎn hēi māo bái māo, zhuō dào lǎoshǔ jiùshì hǎo māo
"No matter if it is a white cat or a black cat; as long as it can catch mice, it is a good cat."

(Source: From a speech in a meeting of the Secretariat, actually a Sichuan proverb)

实事求是。
Shí shì qiú shì
Seek truth from facts
(Actually coined by Mao Zedong, but never really effectively used until Deng's time. This is a slogan referring to pragmatism. Beginning in the late 1970s, it was promoted by Deng Xiaoping and is a part of the official ideology of Socialism with Chinese characteristics. The phrase means to look for economic and political solutions that have practical application rather than those based on political ideology.)

一部分先富起来。
Yibufen xian fuqilai.
Some must get rich first!
(The first reforms in the late 1970s and early 1980s consisted of opening trade with the outside world, instituting the household responsibility system in agriculture, by which farmers could sell their surplus crops on the open market, and the establishment of township village enterprises. The slogan is actually Some must get rich first, and help others to get rich in order to gradually achieve common prosperity.)

一国两制
yì guó liǎng zhì
One country, two systems

(Also coined by Mao Zedong. This idea was later proposed by Deng Xiaoping during the early 1980s for the reunification of China. He suggested that there will be only one China, but areas such as Hong Kong, Macau and Taiwan can have their own capitalist economical and political systems, while mainland China uses the "socialist" system.)

== J ==
=== Jing Ke ===
Jing Ke (Chinese: 荊軻; pinyin: Jīng Kē; Wade–Giles: Ching K'o) was a guest residing in the estates of Dan, crown prince of Yan and renowned for his failed assassination of the Chinese emperor Qin Shi Huang who reigned from 221 BC to 210 BC. His story is told in the chapter entitled Biography of the Assassins (刺客列傳) in Sima Qian's Records of the Grand Historian, or Shiji. He reportedly shouted out this impromptu poem after a cup of wine with friends:

风潇潇兮，易水寒，壮士一去兮不复返!
”Piercing wind, freezing river of Yi. The hero fords, and he never returns!"
(This ideal of heroism reflects the general ideology of the society at that time.)

== L ==
=== Laozi ===
Laozi (Chinese: 老子, Pinyin: Lǎozǐ; also transliterated as Laozi, Lao Tse, Laotze, and in other ways) was an ancient Chinese philosopher. According to Chinese tradition, Lao Tzu lived in the 6th century BC, however many historians contend that Laozi actually lived in the 4th century BC, which was the period of Hundred Schools of Thought and Warring States period.

道可道﹐非常道；名可名，非常名。
Dao ke dao, fei chang dao; ming ke ming, fei chang ming.
”The path that can be walked is not always the path; the name that can be named is not always the name.”
(Literally: "Path can walk, not always path; Name can name, not always name.")

千里之行﹐始於足下。
Qian li zhi xing, shi yu zu xia.
A journey of a thousand miles begins with a single step.

=== Li Bai ===
Li Bai (李白) (701-762) was a Chinese poet who lived during the Tang dynasty.

花间一壶酒。

花间一壶酒。 Amongst the flowers is a pot of wine;
独酌无相亲。 I pour alone but with no friend at hand;
举杯邀明月。 So I lift the cup to invite the shining moon;
对影成三人。 Along with my shadow, a fellowship of three.

(From Drinking Alone by Moonlight)

=== Li Youyuan ===
东方红
Dōngfāng hóng
The East Is Red
(A song that was the de facto anthem of the People's Republic of China during the Cultural Revolution in the 1960s. The lyrics of the song were attributed to, Li Youyuan, a farmer from northern Shaanxi, and the melody was from a local folk song. He allegedly got his inspiration upon seeing the rising sun in the morning of a sunny day.

The song was played through PA systems in every city and village from dawn to dusk. A broadcast show usually began with the song "The East Is Red", and ended with the song "The Internationale".)

=== Lu Xun ===
Lu Xun (simplified Chinese: 鲁迅; traditional Chinese: 魯迅; pinyin: Lǔ Xùn) or Lu Hsün (Wade-Giles) (1881 – 1936), has been considered one of the major Chinese writers of the 20th century and the founder of modern baihua (白话 báihuà), or vernacular, literature. Also a noted translator, his literary works and essays exerted a substantial influence after the May Fourth Movement.

革命是要人生，不是要人死！
Geming shi yao rensheng, bu shi yao ren si!
The Revolution is so that people can live, not so that they can die!

横眉冷对千夫指, 俯首甘为孺子牛.
Hengmei lengdui qian fu zhi, fushou ganwei ruzi niu.
Fierce-browed, I coolly defy a thousand pointing fingers,. Head-bowed, like a willing ox I serve the youngsters.

=== Luo Guanzhong ===
Luo Guanzhong (Traditional Chinese: 羅貫中; Wade Giles: Lo Kuan-chung) (c 1330 - 1400) was a 14th-century Chinese author attributed with writing Romance of the Three Kingdoms and editing Outlaws of the Marsh, two of the most revered adventure epics in Chinese literature.

四海之内皆兄弟
Sihai zhi nei jie xiongdi.
All Men Are Brothers
(Title of the novel 水滸傳 Shuǐhǔ Zhuàn in one of the first English translations by Pearl Buck. Titled All Men are Brothers and published in 1933)

== M ==
=== Mao Zedong ===
Mao Zedong (1893 – 1976) (also Mao Tse-Tung in Wade-Giles) was Chairman of the Chinese Communist Party (CCP) from 1945 until his death. He instigated several major socio-political programmes (some through collectivisation), including the Anti-Rightist Campaign, the Great Leap Forward and the Cultural Revolution.

百花齊放，百家爭鳴
Bǎihuā qífàng, bǎijiā zhēngmíng.
"Let a hundred flowers bloom; let a hundred schools of thought contend."
( Mao had used this to signal what he had wanted from the intellectuals of the country, for different and competing ideologies to voice their opinions about the issues of the day.)

一切反动派都是纸老虎。
Yiqie fandongpai dou shi zhi laohu.
”All Reactionaries are Paper Tigers.“
(Paper tiger is a literal English translation of the Chinese phrase zhǐ lǎohǔ (Chinese: 紙老虎), meaning something which seems as threatening as a tiger, but is really harmless. The phrase is an ancient one in Chinese, but sources differ as to when it entered the English vocabulary. Although some sources may claim it dates back as far as 1850 [1], it seems the Chinese phrase was first translated when it was applied to describe the United States. In 1956, Mao Zedong said of the United States:
”In appearance it is very powerful but in reality it is nothing to be afraid of; it is a paper tiger. Outwardly a tiger, it is made of paper, unable to withstand the wind and the rain. I believe the United States is nothing but a paper tiger.”

枪杆子里面出政权
Qiangganzi limian chu zhengquan.
"Political power grows out of the barrel of a gun."
(The gun is here a metaphor for the military. Mao believed that “the gun must never be allowed to command the Party").

=== Mozi ===
Mozi Chinese: 墨子; pinyin: Mòzǐ; Wade–Giles: Mo Tzu, Lat. as Micius, c. 470 BCE–c. 390 BCE), was a philosopher who lived in China during the Hundred Schools of Thought period (early Warring States period). He founded the school of Mohism and argued strongly against Confucianism and Daoism. During the Warring States period, Mohism was actively developed and practiced in many states, but fell out of favour when the legalist Qin dynasty came to power.

視人之國若視其國，視人之家若視其家，視人之身若視其身。
Shi ren zhi guo ruo shi qi guo, shi ren zhi jia shi qi jia, shi ren zhi shen ruo qi shen.
“They look at the states of others as if they were their own states; they look at the families of others as if they were their own families; they look at others as if they were themselves.”

== S ==
=== Sun Yatsen ===
Sun Yat-sen (Chinese: 孫逸仙; November 12, 1866–March 12, 1925) was a Chinese revolutionary and political leader often referred to as the “father of modern China”. Sun is highly regarded as the National Father of modern China. His political philosophy, known as the Three Principles of the People, was proclaimed in August 1905.

三民主義
Sānmínzhǔyì
Three Principles of the People
(The Three People's Principles, or collectively San-min Doctrine, is a political philosophy as part of a program to make China a free, prosperous, and powerful nation. Its legacy of implementation is most apparent in the governmental organization of the Republic of China. The principles also appear in the first line of the National Anthem of the Republic of China: 三民主義，吾黨所宗，/ 以建民國，以進大同。. Sānmín Zhǔyì, wú dǎng suǒ zōng, / Yǐ jiàn Mínguó, yǐ jìn Dàtóng. San Min Chu-i, Our aim shall be: To found, a free land, World peace, be our stand.)

天下為公
Tianxia wei gong.
The World is for all.

=== Tan Daoji ===
Tan Daoji (檀道濟; (died 436) was a high level general of the dynasty Liu Song. He was one of the most respected generals during the Southern and Northern Dynasties era. Because of this, however, he was feared by Emperor Wen and even more so by Emperor Wen's brother, the prime minister Liu Yikang, and during an illness of Emperor Wen, Liu Yikang had Tan arrested and executed on false accusations of treason. Tan was said to have had Thirty-Six Strategies.

隔岸觀火。
Gé àn guān huǒ
Watch the fires burning from across the river
(Delay entering the field of battle until all the other players have become exhausted fighting amongst themselves.)

借刀殺人。
Jiè dāo shā rén.
Kill with a borrowed knife
(Attack using the strength of another)

走為上策。
Zǒu wéi shàng cè.
If all else fails, retreat.
(This is the most famous one of the 36th strategy, immortalized in the form of a Chinese idiom: "Of the Thirty-Six Strategies, fleeing is best." 三十六計，走為上策。)

== W ==
=== Wang Xizhi ===
Wang Xizhi (王羲之) (303 - 361) was a Chinese calligrapher, traditionally referred to as the "Sage of Calligraphy" (書聖). His most famous work is the "Preface to the Poems Composed at the Orchid Pavilion" (Chinese: 兰亭序; pinyin: Lán Tíng Xù), the preface of a collection of poems written by a number of poets when gathering at Lanting near the town of Shaoxing for the Spring Purification Festival. The original is lost, but there are a number of fine tracing copies and rubbings.

後之視今，亦由今之視昔。
Hòu zhī shì jīn, yì yóu jīn zhī shì xí.
When future generations look back to my time, it will probably be similar to how I now think of the past.

== X ==
=== Xunzi ===
Xunzi (荀子; born Zhao c. 310–237 BCE) was a Chinese philosopher who lived during the Warring States Period, and was part of the during the Hundred Schools of Thought.

人之性、惡；其善，偽也。
Ren zhi xing ĕ; qi shan wei ye.
Human nature is evil, and goodness is caused by intentional activity.
(Xunzi thought that man is prone to evil dispositions, and that ethical norms had been invented to avoid this.)

== Z ==
=== Zhuangzi ===
Zhuangzi (pinyin), Chuang Tzŭ (Wade-Giles), Chuang Tsu, Zhuang Tze, or Chuang Tse (Traditional Chinese characters: 莊子; Simplified Chinese characters: 庄子, literally meaning "Master Zhuang") was a famous philosopher in ancient China who lived around the 4th century BCE during the Warring States Period, corresponding to the Hundred Schools of Thought philosophical summit of Chinese thought. Another well-known part of the book, which is also found in Chapter 2, is usually called "Zhuangzi dreamed he was a butterfly".

莊周夢蝶
Zhuāng Zhōu mèng dié
"Zhuangzi dreamed he was a butterfly"
(昔者庄周梦为胡蝶，栩栩然胡蝶也。自喻适志与！不知周也。俄然觉，则蘧蘧然周也。不知周之梦为胡蝶与？胡蝶之梦为周与？周与胡蝶则必有分矣。此之谓物化。
“Once Zhuang Zhou dreamt he was a butterfly, a butterfly flitting and fluttering around, happy with himself and doing as he pleased. He didn't know he was Zhuang Zhou. Suddenly he woke up and there he was, solid and unmistakable Zhuang Zhou. But he didn't know if he was Zhuang Zhou who had dreamt he was a butterfly, or a butterfly dreaming he was Zhuang Zhou. Between Zhuang Zhou and a butterfly there must be some distinction! This is called the Transformation of Things.”
Translated by Burton Watson 1968. The name of the passage has become a common Chinese idiom, and has spread into Western languages as well. It appears, inter alia, as an illustration in Jorge Luis Borges' famous essay "A New Refutation of Time", and may have inspired H. P. Lovecraft's 1918 short story "Polaris".)

== See also ==
Quotations related to Chinese proverbs at Wikiquote
