= Chen prophecy =

Chen 讖 is the Chinese term for 'prophecy'. It is also written chan or, in the Wade–Giles transliteration as "ch'an": "The Ch'an, couched in enigmatic language, predicted luck and disaster, and constituted oracle books." These prophecies could derive from a dream, be brought from overseas, be discovered in excavated inscriptions, or be revealed in "an ecstatic trance". These prophetic texts were much used by the emperors.

== Chen and the emperors ==
At the partition of the empire at the end of the Later Han dynasty, "Liu Bei ... (161–223) in Shu and Sun Quan ... (182–252) in Wu proclaimed their own mandates and, of course, used favorable chen prophecies ... to serve their own purposes." In the Liang dynasty, "Emperor Wu himself quoted prophetic-apocryphal texts". In the Sui dynasty, chen texts were promoted by Wang Shao (fl. 543–608) : as "imperial historian, Wang repeatedly presented favorable prophetic-apocryphal texts and contemporary chen prophecies to Emperor Wen ... . The emperor was greatly pleased. Encouraged, Wang collected ... chen prophecies ... and wei apocryphal texts, and compiled a ... collection ... . Emperor Wen then had this collection distributed nationwide. As founder of the Sui dynasty, "When Yang first enthroned himself, ... he declared that there had been a large number of ... chen prophecies in his favor.".

=== Chen as description ===
These prophetic texts were also officially accepted as descriptions of particular emperors. An official description of Emperor Gao of the Southern Qi dynasty stated that "His Majesty's name, physical characteristics, as well as the tide, destiny, and the order of succession all correspond with dozens to nearly one hundred chen prophecies."

== Other prophetic texts ==
Other instances of such prophecy are the Wan Nian Ke ("10,000 Years' Poem") by Jiang Ziya, composed early in the Western Zhou dynasty; and the Cang Tou ("Secret Record") by Li Chunfeng, composed during the Tang dynasty.

In Vietnam, the 15th century scholar Nguyễn Bỉnh Khiêm is famous for writing Sấm Trạng Trình (讖狀程, The Prophecies of Trạng nguyên Trình), a collection of chens, or sấm in Vietnamese.

== Work cited ==
- Zongli Lü, Power of The Words : Chen Prophecy in Chinese Politics, AD 265–618, Peter Lang (2003) ISBN 0-8204-5868-6
