= Zhongguo Wenxue Shi =

- Traditional Chinese: 中國文學史
- Simplified Chinese: 中国文学史
Transcriptions
Standard Mandarin
- Hanyu Pinyin: Zhōngguó Wénxuéshǐ
- Wade–Giles: Chung-kuo Wen-hsüeh-shih

Zhongguo Wenxue Shi (Chinese: 中國文學史) is a book about the history of Chinese literature by Lin Chuanjia, published in 1904. It was the first known published history of Chinese literature in Chinese.

Lin Quanjia was inspired by Shina bungakushi (支那文学史; "History of Chinese Literature") by Sasakawa Rinpū, published in 1898. The book focused on classical prose, and did not significantly explore works of fiction nor poetry.

According to Giovanni Vitello of the University of Naples "L'Orientale", due to the cultural difference in what "wenxue" meant in pre-1920s China, in this case how "humanities" was defined by the Imperial Edict of 1903, the work "was not exactly a "history" of Chinese literature as we would understand it today".

In 1922 Zheng Zhenduo criticized the book for having a title he felt was misleading.
