= Hainei shizhou ji =

Collection of fantastical stories from the Han dynasty

A Ming dynasty print version of the Hainei shizhou ji

The first page from a 15th century Ming dynasty print version of the work

Title page of the Hainei shizhou ji from late 19th century Korea

Hainei shizhou ji (traditional Chinese: 海內十洲記; simplified Chinese: 海内十洲记), also known by its shortened name Shizhou ji (traditional Chinese: 十洲記; simplified Chinese: 十洲记), also translated into English as Records of the Ten Continents, Record of Ten Continents within the Seas, and Notes on the Ten Regions on This Side of the Sea, is an ancient Chinese collection of fantastic stories from the Han dynasty. The work is traditionally attributed to the Western Han dynasty scholar Dongfang Shuo (160-93 BCE). Alongside the Shenyijing and Bowuzhi, it is a prominent example of early Chinese fantasy.

Based on mentioning from other texts, the Hainei shizhou ji was already in circulation during the early part of Eastern Han dynasty (25-220).
