= Yandanzi =

A page from a modern copy of Yandanzi

The Yandanzi or Yan Danzi (Chinese: 燕丹子; lit. 'The Prince Dan of Yan') is an ancient Chinese text composed between the Qin and Han dynasties. Although some scholars favors a pre-Han dating for the text, others date the work to the early Han. Yandanzi has achieved considerable fame by the 2nd century BC. The anonymous text is a narrative tale regarding the attempted assassination of Qin Shi Huang.

Yandanzi, along with earlier texts such as Tale of King Mu, Son of Heaven from the Warring States period, are considered prominent examples of a stand-alone work of early Chinese fiction (not including story collections such as Zhuangzi or Yanzi chunqiu).
