= Guicang =

One of the three books of I-Ching, partially lost

The Guicang (歸藏, "Return to the Hidden") is a divination text dating back to the Zhou dynasty, historically circulated alongside the I Ching. It was rediscovered in a rural bog in 1993 after being lost for over two thousand years.

Guicang contains the sixty-four hexagrams, each accompanied by related stories. For example, Hexagram 54 of the I Ching, "Returning Maiden," is paired with the story of how the maiden Chang'e stole the medicine of immortality from Xi Wangmu and, upon returning home, used the hexagrams to determine that she should flee to the moon.
