= Wuya quanshu =

Collection of Chinese books

Wuya quanshu (simplified Chinese: 五雅全书; traditional Chinese: 五雅全書; pinyin: Wǔyǎ quánshū; Wade–Giles: Wu-ya ch'üan-shu) is a Chinese compendium (congshu) compiled by Lang Kuijin 郎奎金 during the Ming dynasty. The title translates roughly as "Complete Book of the Five Ya." The term "Five Ya" (五雅) refers to five classical Chinese lexicons that explain ancient words, terms, and objects. The collection deals with old dictionaries of glosses to ancient texts, and it starts with the Erya, the oldest.

The Five Ya include:

- Erya (尔雅)
- Xiao Erya (小尔雅), compiled by Kong Fu 孔鲋 at the time of end of the state of Qin
- Yiya (逸雅), originally titled Shiming (释名) by Liu Xi 刘熙 in the Eastern Han dynasty, title changed by Lang
- Guangya (广雅), compiled by Zhang Yi 张揖 of the Wei state during the Three Kingdoms period
- Piya (埤雅), compiled by Lu Dian 陆佃 in the Northern Song dynasty

All five works serve as dictionaries or glossaries that clarify the meanings of ancient words, names, and objects. Together, they represent an important part of Chinese lexicographical tradition.

The Piya 埤雅 by Lu Dian 陆佃 for example is used by the Hanyu da zidian (HYDZD) in an edition of the Wuya quanshu 五雅全书.

== See also ==
- Glossary of Chinese Historical Phonology (in German)

== Bibliography ==
- Wuya quanshu 五雅全書. Yiwen yinshuguan 藝文印書館 1967
