= Gujin yishi =

Ming collectaneum

Gujin yishi (Chinese: 古今逸史; pinyin: Gujin yishi; Wade–Giles: Ku-chin i-shih "Remnant Histories of Past and Present"), sometimes abbreviated as Yishi 逸史, is a Ming dynasty congshu (collection). The collection was compiled by Wu Guan 吳琯 (jinshi degree 1571) from Xin'an (新安). The work comprises 55 writings (zhong) in a total of 233 volumes (juan).

These writings contain historical material not recorded in the official histories (zhengshi). Accordingly, there are sayings such as Shǐ shī qiú yě “史失求野” ("If the official history omits something, search for it in popular records") or Rù zhèngshǐ bǔ quē, chū zhèngshǐ shí yí “入正史則可補其闕，出正史則可拾其遺” ("If included in the official history, it fills its gaps; if outside, it preserves what was lost").

The collection Gujin yishi is divided into two main categories: Yizhi (逸志) and Yiji (逸記). The category Yizhi is further subdivided into Hezhi (合志, general treatises) and Fenzhi (分志, specialized treatises). The category Yiji is divided into Ji (紀, annals), Shijia (世家, family chronicles), and Liezhuan (列傳, biographies).

== Contents ==
Table of Contents
In the Chinese catalogue at the CUL, the Gujin yishi is arranged in the following sections:

Yizhi fenzhi 逸志分志

Yuyan lei 语言类

- Youxuan shizhe jue dai yu shi bieguo fangyan 輶轩使者绝代语释别国方言. 13 juan (Han) Yang Xiong 杨雄, (Jin) Guo Pu 郭璞 (commentary)
- Shiming 释名. 8 juan (Han) Liu Xi 刘熙
- Baihutong delun 白虎通德论. 5 juan (Han) Ban Gu 班固
- Guangya 广雅. 10 juan (Wei) Zhang Yi 张揖, (Sui) Cao Xian 曹宪 (音解-commentary)
- Fengsu tongyi 风俗通义. 4 juan (Han) Ying Shao 应劭
- Xiao Erya 小尔雅. 1 juan (Han) Kong Fu 孔鲋, (Song) Song Xian 宋咸 (commentary)
- Duduan 独断. 1 juan (Han) Cai Yong 蔡邕
- Kanwu 刊误. 2 juan (Tang) Li Fu 李涪
- Gujin zhu 古今注. 3 juan (Jin) Cui Bao 崔豹
- Zhonghua gujin zhu 中华古今注. 3 juan (Later Tang) Ma Gao 马缟
- Bowuzhi 博物志. 10 juan (Jin) Zhang Hua 张华, (Song) Zhou Riyong 周日用 (commentary), (Song) Lu 卢氏 (commentary)
- Xu Bowuzhi 续博物志. 10 juan (Song) Li Shi 李石
- Shiyi ji 拾遗记. 10 juan (Former Qin) Wang Jia 王嘉, (Liang) Xiao Qi 萧绮 (record)

Yizhi fenji 逸志分志

- Shanhai jing 山海经. 18 juan (Jin) Guo Pu 郭璞 传
- Hainei shizhou ji 海内十洲记. 1 juan (Han) Dongfang Shuo 东方朔
- Wudi ji 吴地记. 1 juan, later collection 1 juan (Tang) Lu Guangwei 陆广微
- Yueyang fengtu ji 岳阳风土记. 1 juan (Song) Fan Zhiming 范致明
- Luoyang mingyuan ji 洛阳名园记. 1 juan (Song) Li Gefei 李格非
- Guihai yuheng zhi 桂海虞衡志. 1 juan (Song) Fan Chengda 范成大
- Beibian beidui 北边备对. 1 juan (Song) Cheng Dachang 程大昌
- Zhenla fengtu ji 真腊风土记. 1 juan (Yuan) Zhou Daguan 周达观
- Sanfu huangtu 三辅黄图. 6 juan (Han)
- Yonglu 雍录. 10 juan (Song) Cheng Dachang 程大昌
- Luoyang qielan ji 洛阳伽蓝记. 5 juan (Later Wei) Yang Xuanzhi 杨炫之
- Jiaofang ji 教坊记. 1 juan (Tang) Cui Lingqin 崔令钦
- Yuefu zalu 乐府杂录. 1 juan (Tang) Duan Anjie 段安节
- Jiujing buyun 九经补韵. 1 juan (Song) Yang Boyan 杨伯岩

Yizhi ji 逸记纪

- Sanfen 三坟. 1 juan (Jin) Ruan Xian 阮咸 (commentary)
- Mu Tianzi zhuan 穆天子传. 6 juan (Jin) Guo Pu 郭璞 (commentary)
- Zhushu jinian 竹书纪年. 2 juan (Liang) Shen Yue 沈约 (commentary)
- Jizhong Zhoushu 汲冢周书. 10 juan (Jin) Kong Chao 孔晁 (commentary)
- Xijing zaji 西京杂记. 6 juan (Han) Liu Xin 刘歆, (Jin) Ge Hong 葛洪 (record)
- Bieguo dongming ji 别国洞冥记. 4 juan (Han) Guo Xian 郭宪
- Hanwu gushi 汉武故事. 1 juan (Han) Ban Gu 班固
- Zhaohou waizhuan 赵后外传. 1 juan (Han) Ling Xuan 伶玄
- Haishan ji 海山记. 1 juan (Tang)
- Milou ji 迷楼记. 1 juan (Tang)
- Kaihe ji 开河记. 1 juan (Tang)
- Liuchao shiji bianlei 六朝事迹编类. 2 juan (Song) Zhang Dunyi 张敦颐

Yizhi shijia 逸记世家

- Jin shicheng 晋史乘. 1 juan
- Chushi taowu 楚史檮杌. 1 juan
- Yuejue shu 越绝书. 15 juan (Han) Yuan Kang 袁康
- Wuyue chunqiu 吴越春秋. 6 juan (Han) Zhao Ye 赵晔, (Yuan) Xu Tianhu 徐天祜 (音注-commentary)

Yizhi liezhuan shijia 逸记列传逸记世家

- Huayang guozhi 华阳国志. 12 juan (Jin) Chang Qu 常璩

Yizhi liezhuan 逸记列传

- Gaoshi zhuan 高士传. 3 juan (Jin) Huangfu Mi 皇甫谧
- Liexian zhuan 列仙传. 2 juan (Han) Liu Xiang 刘向
- Jianxia zhuan 剑侠传. 4 juan (Tang)
- Shenseng zhuan 神僧传. 9 juan (unknown)
- Benshi shi 本事诗. 1 juan (Tang) Meng Qi 孟棨
- Xu Qixie ji 续齐谐记. 1 juan (Liang) Wu Jun 吴均
- Boyi ji 博异记. 1 juan (Tang) Zheng Huangu 郑还古
- Jiyi ji 集异记. 1 juan (Tang) Xue Yongruo 薛用弱
- Liao zhi 辽志. 1 juan (Song) Ye Longli 叶隆礼
- Jin zhi 金志. 1 juan (Yuan) Yuwen Maozhao 宇文懋昭
- Songmo jiwen 松漠纪闻. 1 juan, with supplement 1 juan (Song) Hong Hao 洪皓

== Reception ==
The Hanyu da zidian (HYDZD) cites editions of this congshu, including references for Huangfu Mi (215-282). Alexander Wylie's book Notes on Chinese Literature lists the individual titles of the collection in its Appendix III.

== See also ==
- Official history (zhengshi)

== Bibliography ==
- Li Xueqin 李學勤, Lü Wenyu 呂文鬰, eds.: Siku da cidian 四庫大辭典. 2 vols. Jilin daxue chubanshe, Changchun 1996 (vol. 2, 2072a).
- Alexander Wylie: Notes on Chinese Literature. 1902 (Appendix III).
