= Shuowen Jiezi (TV series) =

Shuowen Jiezi (simplified Chinese: 说文解字; traditional Chinese: 說文解字; pinyin: Shuōwén Jiězì) is the title of an educational television series broadcast daily on China's Sun TV channel and presented by Zhuang Jing (庄婧). The title is taken from the ancient Chinese etymological dictionary Shuowen Jiezi, and each episode briefly explains a Chinese character.

For scheduling purposes the series is also given an English title, Hanzi Tracing, but this is not a translation of the Chinese title. There is no English in the programs themselves.

== Broadcast times ==
The program is 5 minutes in length and a new episode is broadcast each day. The day's episode is repeated up to 4 times during the next 24 hours. As of December 2010, the usual broadcast times were 04:07, 11:18, 16:53 and 19:55 UTC+08:00 (= 03:18, 08:53, 11:55 and 20:07 UTC) but these do vary.

A selection of some of the previous episodes is also available to view on the program's Web archive.

== Opening and closing lines ==
Zhuang Jing starts each episode with a couplet (simplified Chinese: 中国字 - 天下是 - 欢迎来到说文解字; traditional Chinese: 中國字 - 天下是 - 歡迎來到說文解字; pinyin: Zhōngguózì - tiānxià shì - huānyíng láidào Shuōwén Jiězì; lit. 'Chinese characters everywhere are', 'welcome arrive Shuowen Jiezi') followed by an introduction (simplified Chinese: 我是庄婧——《说文解字》——今天呢? 让我们一起来解一个 pause X 字; traditional Chinese: 我是莊婧——《說文解字》——今天呢? 讓我們一起來解一個 pause X 字; pinyin: wǒ shì Zhuāng Jìng—Shuōwén Jiězì—jīntiān ne? ràng wǒmen yīqǐ lái jiě yī ge (pause) X zì; lit. 'I'm Zhuang Jing—today? let us together explain an X character' where X is the sound of the character about to be discussed). The episode usually ends with a variant of a standard closing (simplified Chinese: 《说文解字》——今天直到这，我们下次再会; traditional Chinese: 《說文解字》——今天直到這，我們下次再會; pinyin: Shuōwén Jiězì—jīntiān zhídào zhè, wǒmen xiàcì zàihuì; lit. 'Shuowen Jiezi—today until here', 'we next-time again-meet').
