= Shengxun =

Method using Chinese character homophones

In classical Chinese philology, shengxun (聲訓; 'voice explanation') or yinxun (音訓; 'sound explanation') is a practice found in Chinese dictionaries where characters are explained by use of a homophone or near-homophone. The practice is ancient, and is present in texts predating the Qin dynasty (221–206 BC). The ancient Shiming (c. 200 AD) dictionary is notable for using shengxun for most of its definitions, and the highly influential Shuowen Jiezi compiled by Xu Shen c. 100 AD also employs the technique. For example, Xu's explanation of the word 'ghost' (鬼) is:

人 所 歸 爲 鬼
Rén suǒ guī wéi guǐ
Human PASS return is ghost
"A 'ghost' is what humans return to."

The words for 'ghost' and 'return' are near-homophones both in Xu's reading and in modern Standard Chinese. A similar explanation of the word can be found in the earlier Erya (c. 3rd century BC). Shengxun can be highly fanciful, and often results in folk etymology. Put another way, the practice points to a notion of 'cognate characters' (同源字), or what Bernhard Karlgren called "word families".

== See also ==
- Rebus
