= Sun TV =

Sun TV may refer to:

- Sun TV (India), an Indian Tamil cable television channel owned by Sun TV Network
  - Sun TV Network, the company that owns the Tamil television channel
- Sun TV (Hong Kong), a Mandarin satellite television channel based in Hong Kong
- SUN TV (Turkey), a local TV in Mersin, Turkey
- Sun News Network (2011–2015), a defunct Canadian news and opinion channel, originally proposed under the name "Sun TV News Channel"
  - CKXT-TV (2003–2011), a defunct independent television station in Toronto, Canada which used the on-air name SUN TV
- Sun Television, a television station in Hyōgo Prefecture, Japan
- Sun Television and Appliances, a defunct retailer of consumer electronics
- Sun Sports, a Florida sports broadcasting network
- SUN TV, the former names of iNews a private terrestrial television network in Indonesia
- Lemar TV (Pashto for "Sun TV"), a television station based in Kabul, Afghanistan
