= List of collections of illustrated biographies of historical figures of China =

Illustrated biographies of historical figures of China List

This is a List of collections of illustrated biographies of historical figures of China. The alphabetical overview contains collections of illustrated biographies (xiangzhuan, 像傳) of prominent historical figures of China, partly legendary. Many of the collections are contained in the collection of the work with the title Zhongguo lidai renwu xiangzhuan (simplified Chinese: 中国历代人物像传; traditional Chinese: 中國歷代人物像傳; pinyin: Zhōngguó lìdài rénwù xiàngzhuàn; see under Further reading), a book which features woodblock-engraved portraits from the Ming and Qing dynasties, arranged according to the traditional biographical format used in historical records. The following list focuses on collections of illustrated biographies. There are many other forms of biographical collections in China.

== List ==
Note: The illustrations presented are samples from the listed works.

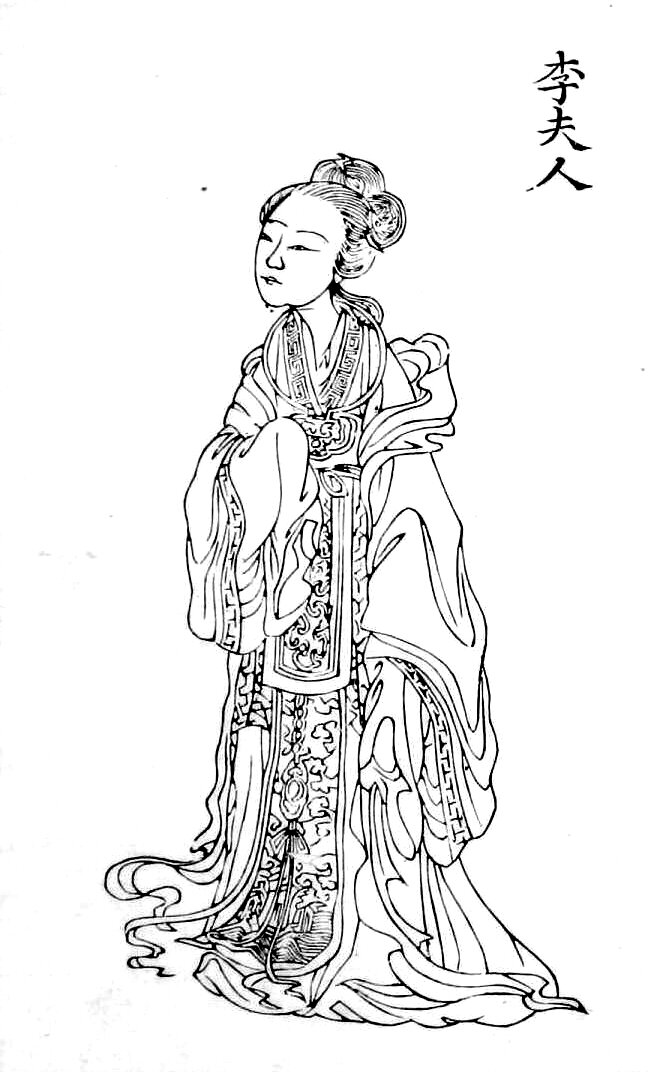
Lady Li (Baimei xinyong tuzhuan)

=== Baimei xinyong tuzhuan ===
Baimei xinyong tuzhuan (百美新詠圖傳 or Baimei xinyong 百美新詠, Illustrated biographies of one hundred beauties with new verses) Illustrated work of the Qing dynasty with poetic descriptions of female beauty, virtue, and cultural significance.

=== Gaoshi zhuan ===
Gaoshi zhuan (高士传 / 高士傳) by Huangfu Mi (皇甫謐, 215-282); cf. Gujin yishi 古今逸史 edition. See also Diwang shiji (帝王世紀 / 帝王世纪) and Lienü zhuan (列女傳) by the same author.

=== Gengzi Xinhai zhonglie xiangzan ===
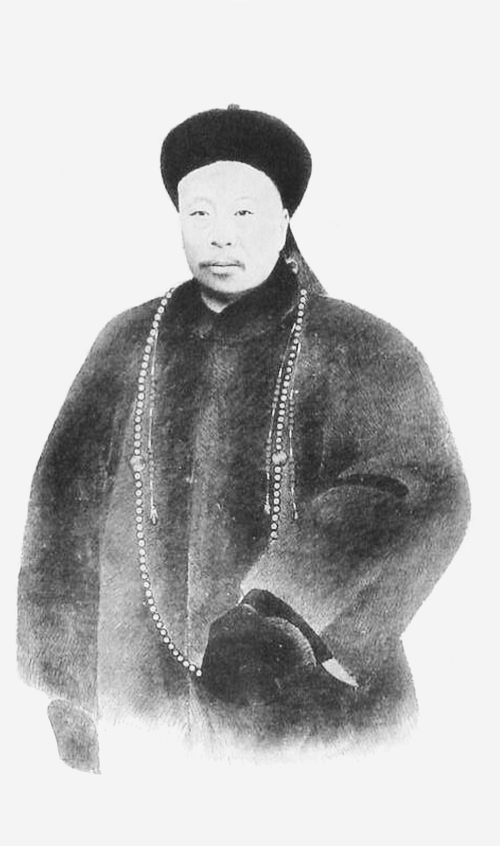
Xu Jingcheng

Gengzi Xinhai zhonglie xiangzan (庚子辛亥忠烈像赞) "Eulogies and Portraits of the Loyal and Heroic Figures of the Gengzi and Xinhai Years" is a work edited in 1934 by Feng Shu (馮恕, 1867–1948) that honors the high-ranking officials of the Qing Dynasty who died during the Gengzi Incident 庚子事件 of 1900 and the Xinhai Revolution of 1911. Each entry features a portrait of the individual, followed by a brief biography and a eulogy poem. It documents the martyrs of the late Qing period.

=== Gu shengxian xiang zhuan lüe ===
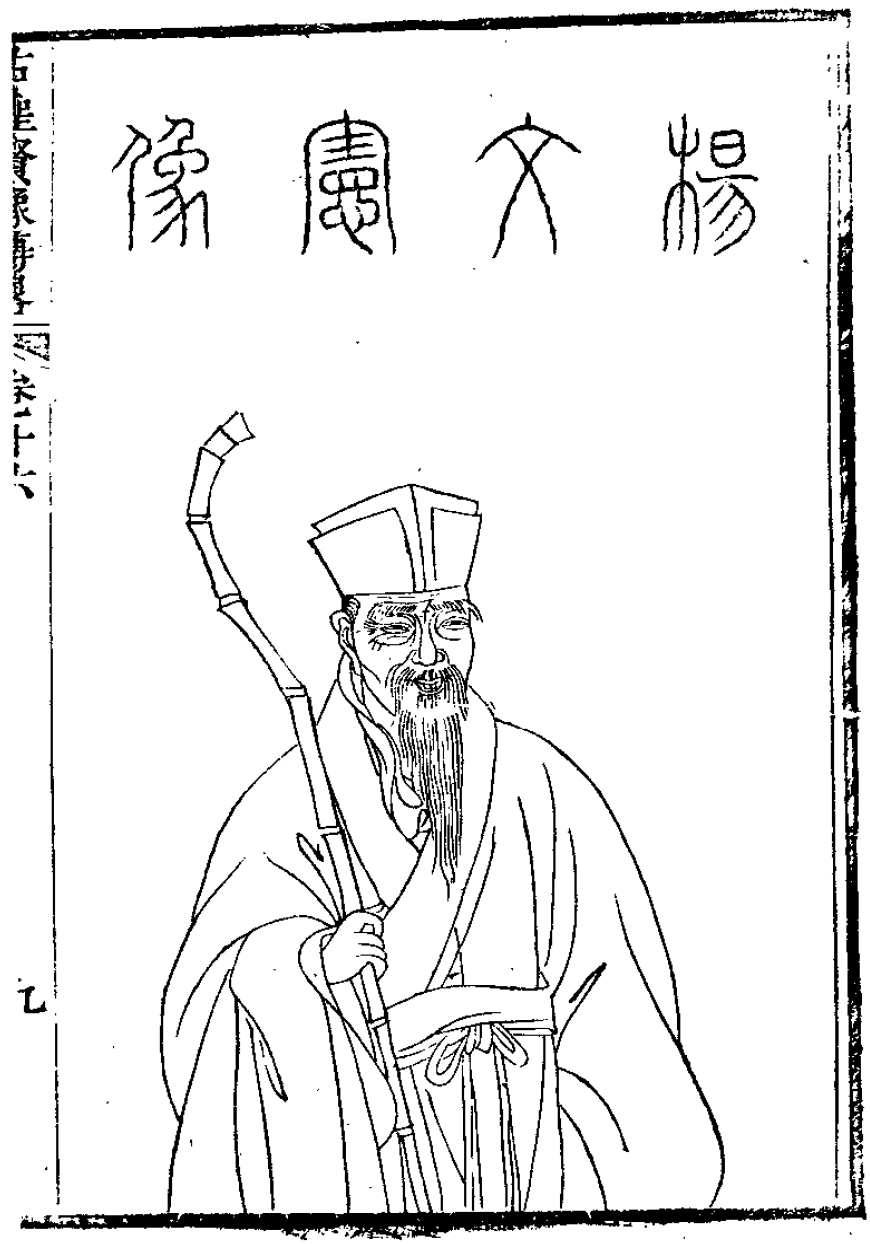
Yang Wenxian

Gu shengxian xiang zhuan lüe (古圣贤像传略 / 古圣賢像傳略) Work on the ancient sages and saints of China. Edited by Gu Yuan 顾沅 during the Qing Dynasty; the portraits were drawn by Kong Lianqing (孔蓮卿). Includes biographical sketches (zhuanlüe, 傳略) and portraits (xiang, 像).

=== Jianxia zhuan ===
Jianxia zhuan (劍俠傳; Tales of Sword Knights) by Wang Shizhen (1526–1590)

=== Lidai guren xiangzan ===
Emperor Shun

Lidai guren xiangzan (历代古人像赞 / 歷代古人像贊) (Portraits of the ancients throughout the ages, with praise) Collection of portraits and eulogies of historical figures from various dynasties. Xiangzan (像贊) means 'portrait with praise.' The work was published in 1498 during the Ming Dynasty and contains 88 portraits of figures from Fuxi to Huang Tingjian.

=== Lingyan ge gongchen tu ===
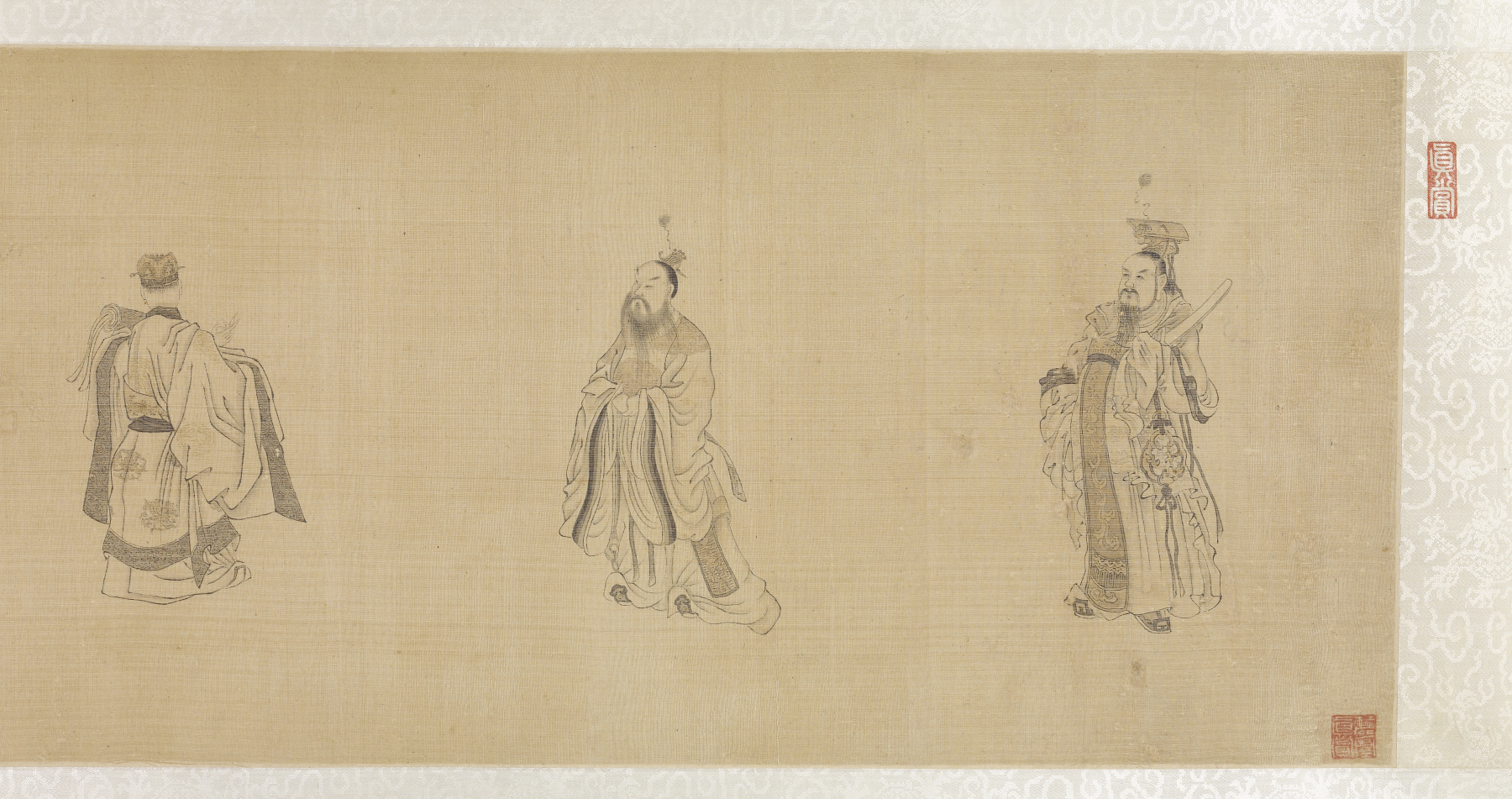
Three ministers

Lingyan ge gongchen tu (凌烟阁功臣图 / 凌煙閣功臣圖) Meritorious Officials of Lingyan Pavilion (digital copy)

=== Qingdai xuezhe xiangzhuan ===
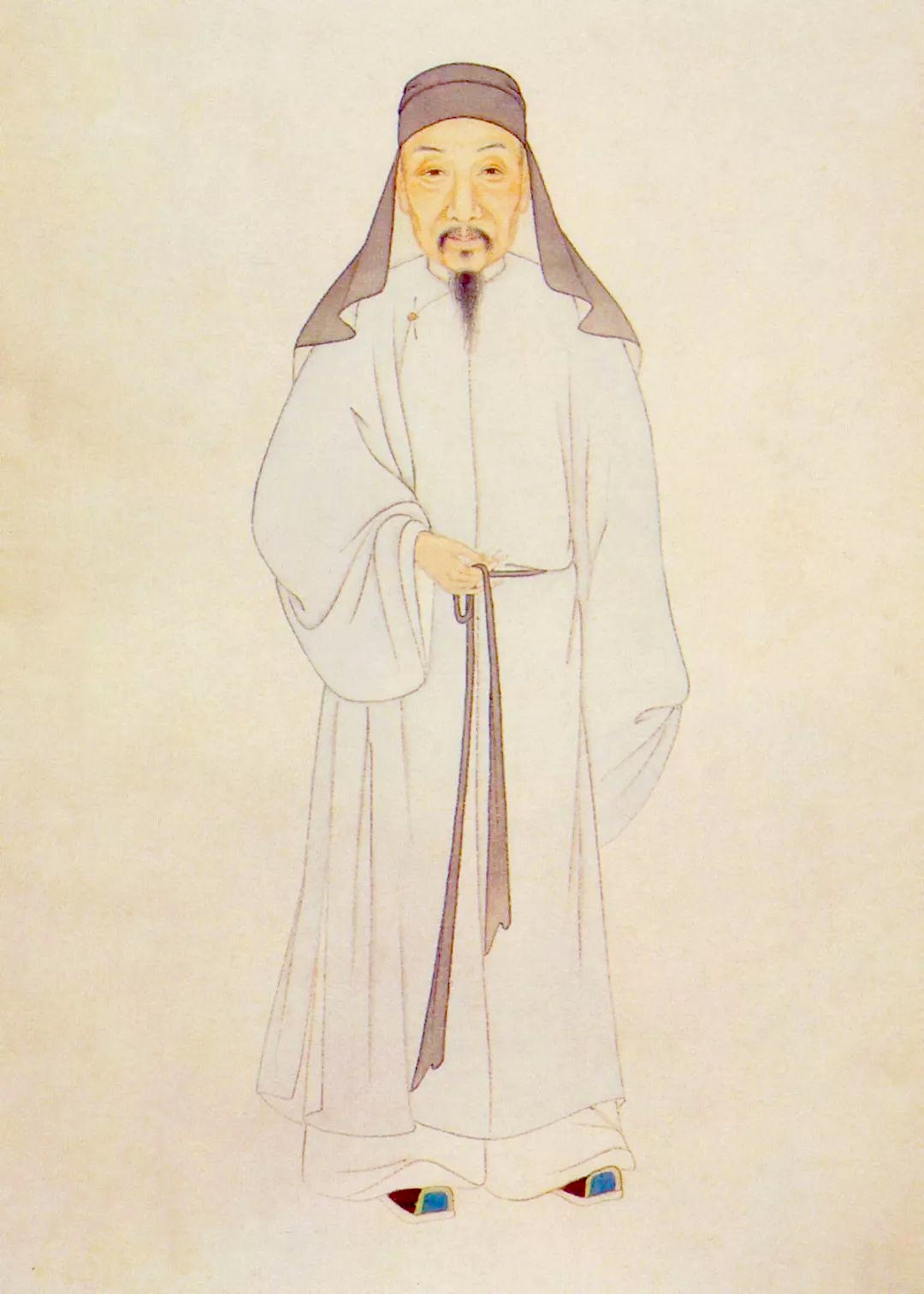
Gu Yanwu

Qingdai xuezhe xiangzhuan (清代学者象传) Biographical work with portraits and descriptions of prominent scholars of the Qing Dynasty. Documents the intellectual life and key thinkers of that period.

=== Qinhuai bayan tuyong ===
Qinhuai bayan tuyong (秦淮八艷圖詠 / 秦淮八豔圖詠), a 19th-century book

=== Sanbuxiu tuzan ===
Sanbuxiu tuzan (三不朽图赞) or Ming yu Yue sanbuxiu mingxian tuzan (明於越三不朽名賢圖贊; Portraits and encomia of the eminent worthies of the three eternals in the Yue region of the Ming) of Zhang Dai 張岱 (web)

=== Sancai tuhui ===
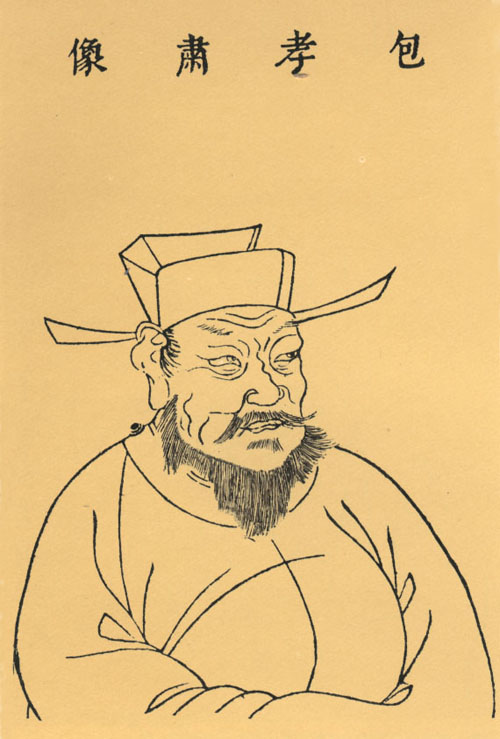
Bao Zheng

Sancai tuhui (三才圖會) Encyclopedic work from the Ming period by Wang Qi and Wang Siyi, covering Heaven (tian), Earth (di), and Man (ren) – the 'three powers' (sancai). Includes texts and illustrations on history, science, geography, and culture. Served as a model for many later illustrated compendia.

=== Shengxian xiangzan ===
Shengxian xiangzan (圣贤像赞 / 圣賢像贊) Images and eulogies of sages and worthies. Edited by Lu Weiqi, collection of portraits and eulogies of sages and saints. Similar to the works Lidai guren xiang zan and Gu shengxian xiang zhuanlüe.

=== Wanxiaotang huazhuan ===
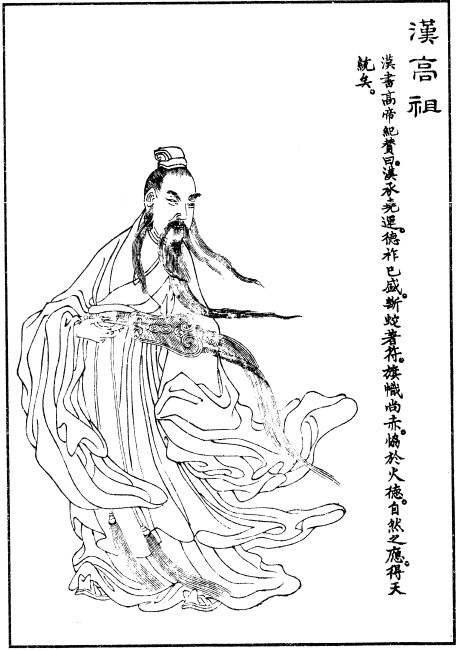
Han Gaozu (Liu Bang)

Wanxiaotang huazhuan (晚笑堂画传 / 晚笑堂畫傳) Famous illustrated work by Shangguan Zhou from the Qing period. Contains hundreds of portraits of historical figures with short biographies and moral commentary. The title means 'Pictorial Biographies from the Hall of the Late Smile'.

=== Wujun mingxian tuzhuanzan ===
Wujun mingxian tuzhuanzan (吴郡名贤图传赞 / 吳郡名賢圖傳贊) Illustrated biographies with commemorative poems of celebrated worthies from Wu prefecture (digital copy)

=== Wushuang pu ===
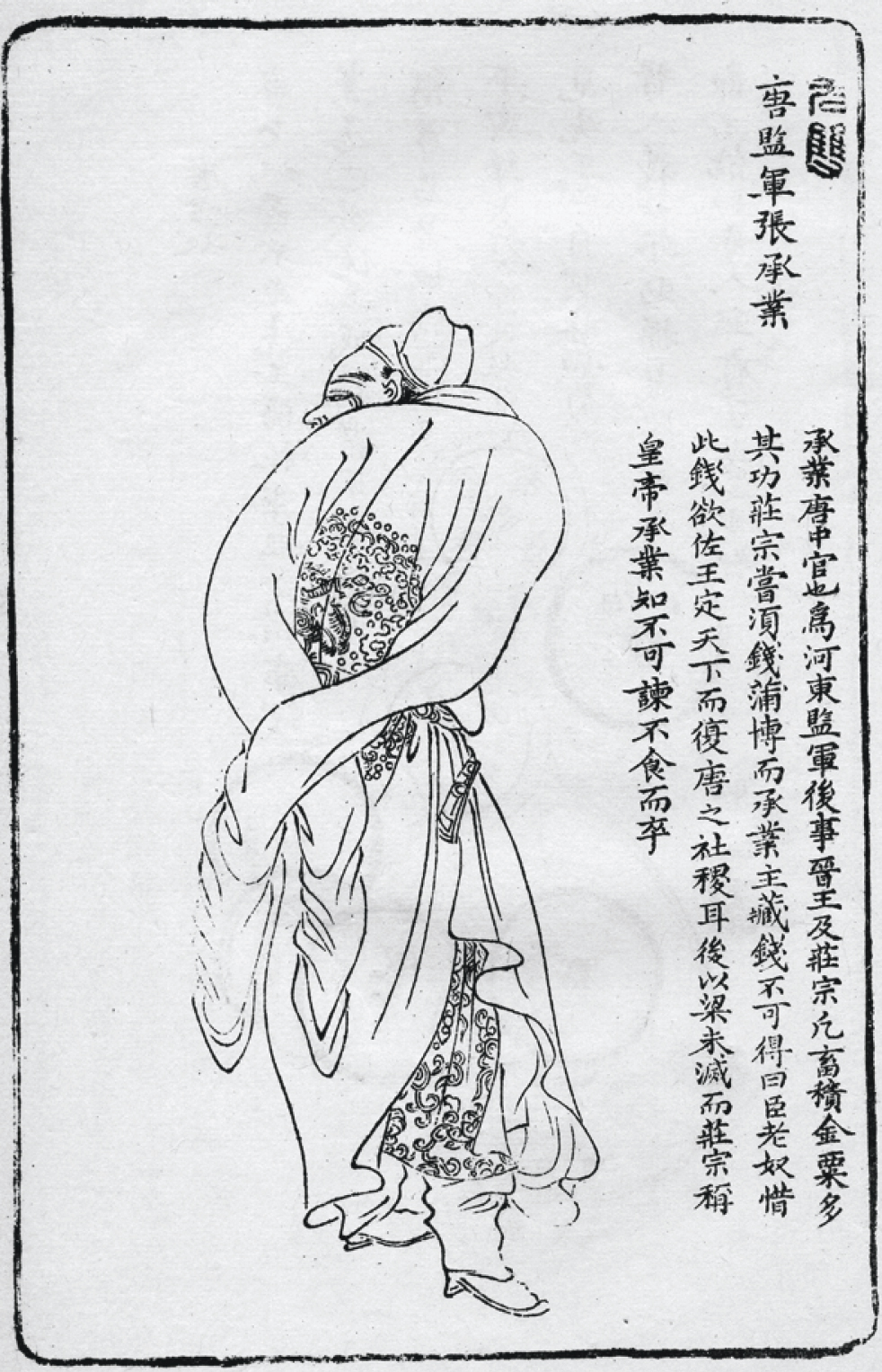
Zhang Chengye

Wushuang pu (无双谱) Work by Jin Guliang, collection of legendary figures with portraits and short biographies. The title means 'The Incomparables'.

=== Yuntai sanshi'er jiangtu ===
Yuntai sanshi'er jiangtu (云臺三十二將圖 / 云台三十二将图) by the painter Zhang Shibao 张士葆 (1805–1878) in the Qing dynasty.

=== Yuyue xianxian xiang zhuanzan ===
Yuyue xianxian xiang zhuanzan (于越先賢像傳贊)

=== Zhongguo lidai renwu xiangzhuan ===
Zhongguo lidai renwu xiangzhuan (中國歷代人物像傳), see Further reading and External links.

=== Zhongguo mingren lu ===
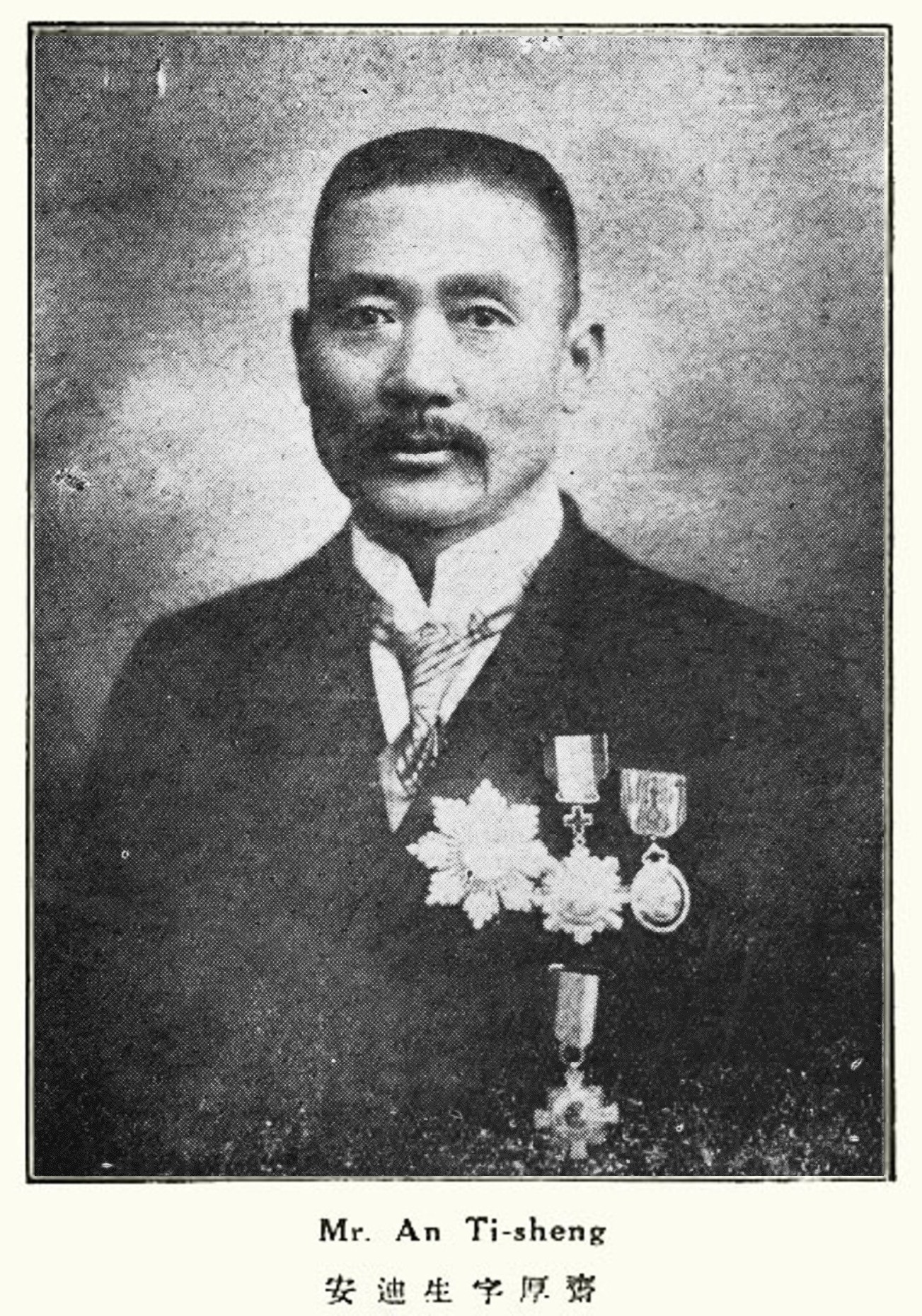
An Disheng

Zhongguo mingren lu (中国名人录) Who's Who in China – Biographical reference work on famous figures of China. Contains short biographies from various eras. The first edition was published between 1918 and 1950 and includes multiple editions.

=== Others ===
Japanese

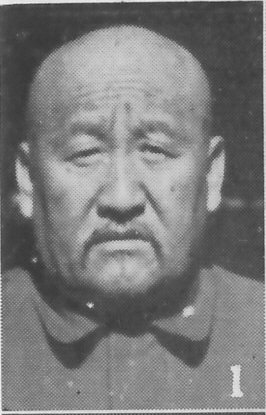
Atalnochir

Saishin Shina yōjin den (最新支那要人传) Japanese work from the early Republican period with portraits and short biographies of contemporary Chinese politicians, military figures, and intellectuals. 'Shina' is an older, now obsolete Japanese term for China.

== See also ==
- Zhongguo lidai renwu xiangzhuan 中国历代人物像传 (Category in Chinese Wikipedia)
