= Shuowen Jiezi =

2nd-century Chinese character dictionary

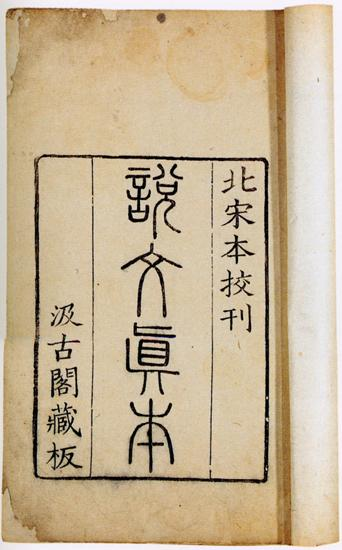
- Cover of a modern reprint of a Song dynasty 'veritable edition' (zhēnběn 真本) of the Shuowen Jiezi
- Traditional Chinese: 說文解字
- Simplified Chinese: 说文解字
- Literal meaning: "Explaining Graphs and Analyzing Characters"
Transcriptions
Standard Mandarin
- Hanyu Pinyin: Shuōwén jiězì
- Wade–Giles: Shuo^{1}-wen^{2} chieh^{3}-tzŭ^{4}
- IPA: [ʂwó.wə̌n tɕjè.tsɨ̂]
Yue: Cantonese
- Yale Romanization: Syut-màhn gáai-jih
- Jyutping: Syut3-man4 gaai2-zi6
- IPA: [syt̚˧.mɐn˩ kaj˧˥.tsi˨]
Southern Min
- Hokkien POJ: Soat-bûn kái-jī
- Tâi-lô: Suat-bûn kái-jī
Middle Chinese
- Middle Chinese: Sywet-mjun kea^{X}-dzi^{H}

The Shuowen Jiezi is a Chinese dictionary compiled by Xu Shen c. 100 CE, during the Eastern Han dynasty (25–220 CE). While prefigured by earlier reference works for Chinese characters like the Erya (c. 3rd century BCE), the Shuowen Jiezi contains the first comprehensive analysis of characters in terms of their structure, where Xu attempted to provide rationales for their construction. It was also the first to organize its entries into sections according to shared components called radicals.

== Background ==
Xu Shen was a scholar of the Five Classics during the Han dynasty. He finished compiling the Shuowen Jiezi in 100 CE. However, due to an unfavorable imperial attitude towards scholarship, he waited until 121 before his son Xu Chong presented it to Emperor An of Han, along with a memorial.

In analyzing the structure of characters and defining the words represented by them, Xu strove to clarify the meaning of the pre-Han classics, so as to ensure order and render their use in governance unquestioned. Xu's motives also included a pragmatic and political dimension: according to Boltz, the compilation of the Shuowen "cannot be held to have arisen from a purely linguistic or lexicographical drive". During the Han era, the prevalent theory of language was the Confucian Rectification of Names, a line of thinking revolving around the use of correct names to ensure proper governance. The postface explains:

Now, as for writing systems and their offspring characters, these are the root of the classics, the origin of kingly government, what former men used to hand down to posterity, and what later men use to remember antiquity.

Previous Chinese dictionaries like the Erya (c. 3rd century BCE) and Fangyan were limited, with entries loosely organized into semantic categories, and merely listing synonymous characters. This layout was comparatively unsuited for looking up characters. In the Shuowen Jiezi, Xu instead organized characters by their apparent shared graphical components. Boltz calls this "a major conceptual innovation in the understanding of the Chinese writing system".

== Structure ==
The 540 radicals used by the Shuowen Jiezi in the original seal script

Xu wrote the Shuowen Jiezi to analyze seal script characters that evolved slowly and organically throughout the mid-to-late Zhou dynasty in the state of Qin, and which were then standardized during the Qin dynasty and promulgated empire-wide. Thus, Needham et al. (1986: 217) describe the Shuowen Jiezi as "a paleographic handbook as well as a dictionary".

The dictionary includes a preface and 15 chapters. The first 14 chapters are character entries; the 15th and final chapter is divided into two parts: a postface and an index of section headers. Xu Shen states in his postface that the dictionary has 9,353 character entries, plus 1,163 graphic variants, with a total length of 133,441 characters. The transmitted texts vary slightly in content, owing to the omissions and emendations of later commentators. Modern editions have 9,831 characters and 1,279 variants.

== Sections ==
Xu Shen sorted the Chinese lexicon into 540 sections, under section headers generally referred to as "radicals" in English: these may be entire characters or simplifications thereof, which also serve as components shared by all the characters in that section. The first section header was 一 (yī 'first') and the last was 亥 (hài), the last character of the Earthly Branches.

Xu's choice of sections appears in large part to have been driven by the desire to create an unbroken, systematic sequence among the headers themselves, such that each had a natural, intuitive relationship (e.g. structural, semantic or phonetic) with the ones before and after, as well as by the desire to reflect cosmology. In the process, he included many section headers that are not considered ones today, such as 炎 (yán 'flame') and 熊 (xióng 'bear'), which modern dictionaries list under the ⽕ 'FIRE' heading. He also included as section headers all the sexagenary cycle characters, that is, the ten Heavenly Stems and twelve Earthly Branches. As a result, unlike modern dictionaries which attempt to maximize the number of characters under each radical, 34 Shuowen radicals have no characters under them, while 159 have only one. From a modern lexicographical perspective, Xu's 540 radicals can seem "enigmatic" or "illogical". For instance, he included 惢 'doubt' as a radical indexing only the rare 繠 (ruǐ 'stamen')—instead of listing the character under the common ⼼ 'HEART'.

== Entries ==
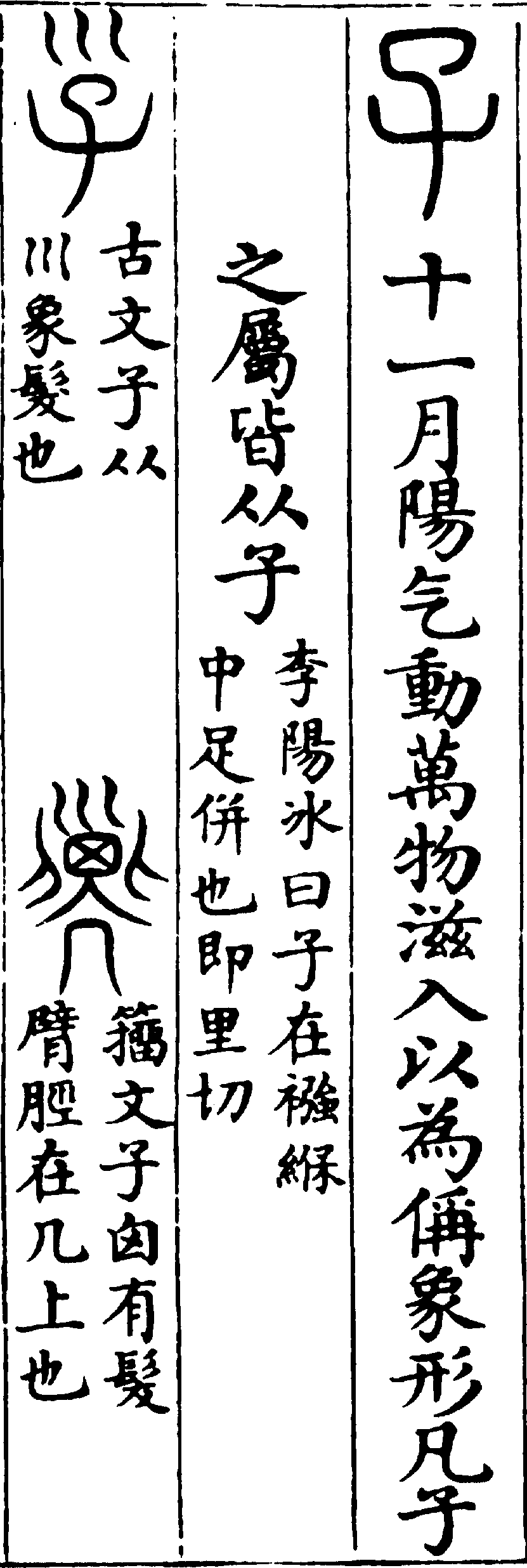
Entry for 子 zǐ 'child', showing the small seal form (top right), with the ancient and Zhou-script forms on the left

A typical Shuowen Jiezi character entry consists of:

1. The seal script form of the character
2. A short definition, usually consisting of a single synonym—occasionally through a shengxun pun, as seen in the Shiming
3. The character's pronunciation, indicated by a homophone
4. In the case of compound graphs, analysis of the character's structure in terms of semantic or phonetic components.

Individual entries can also include graphical variants, secondary definitions, information regarding their regional use, citations from pre-Han texts, and further phonetic information, typically provided in a dúruò (讀若 'read as if') notation.

In addition to the seal script form, two other variant styles were included if they differed in form—called 'ancient script' (gǔwén 古文) and 'Zhou script' (Zhòuwén 籀文), not to be confused with the Zhou dynasty. The Zhou characters were taken from the no-longer extant Shizhoupian, an early copybook traditionally attributed to "Historian Zhou", from the court of King Xuan of Zhou (r. 827–782 BCE). Wang Guowei and Tang Lan argued that the structure and style of these characters suggested a later date, but some modern scholars such as Qiu Xigui argue for the original dating. The ancient characters were based on the characters used in pre-Qin copies of the classics recovered from the walls of houses where they had been hidden to escape the burning of books ordered by Qin Shihuang. Xu believed that these were the most ancient characters available, since Confucius would have used the oldest characters to best convey the meaning of the texts. However, Wang Guowei and other scholars have shown that they were regional variant forms in the eastern areas during the Warring States period, from only slightly earlier than the Qin seal script.

Even as copyists transcribed the main text of the book in clerical script in the late Han, and then in modern standard script in the centuries to follow, the small seal characters continued to be copied in their own seal script to preserve their structure, as were the ancient and Zhou-script characters.

== Structural analysis ==
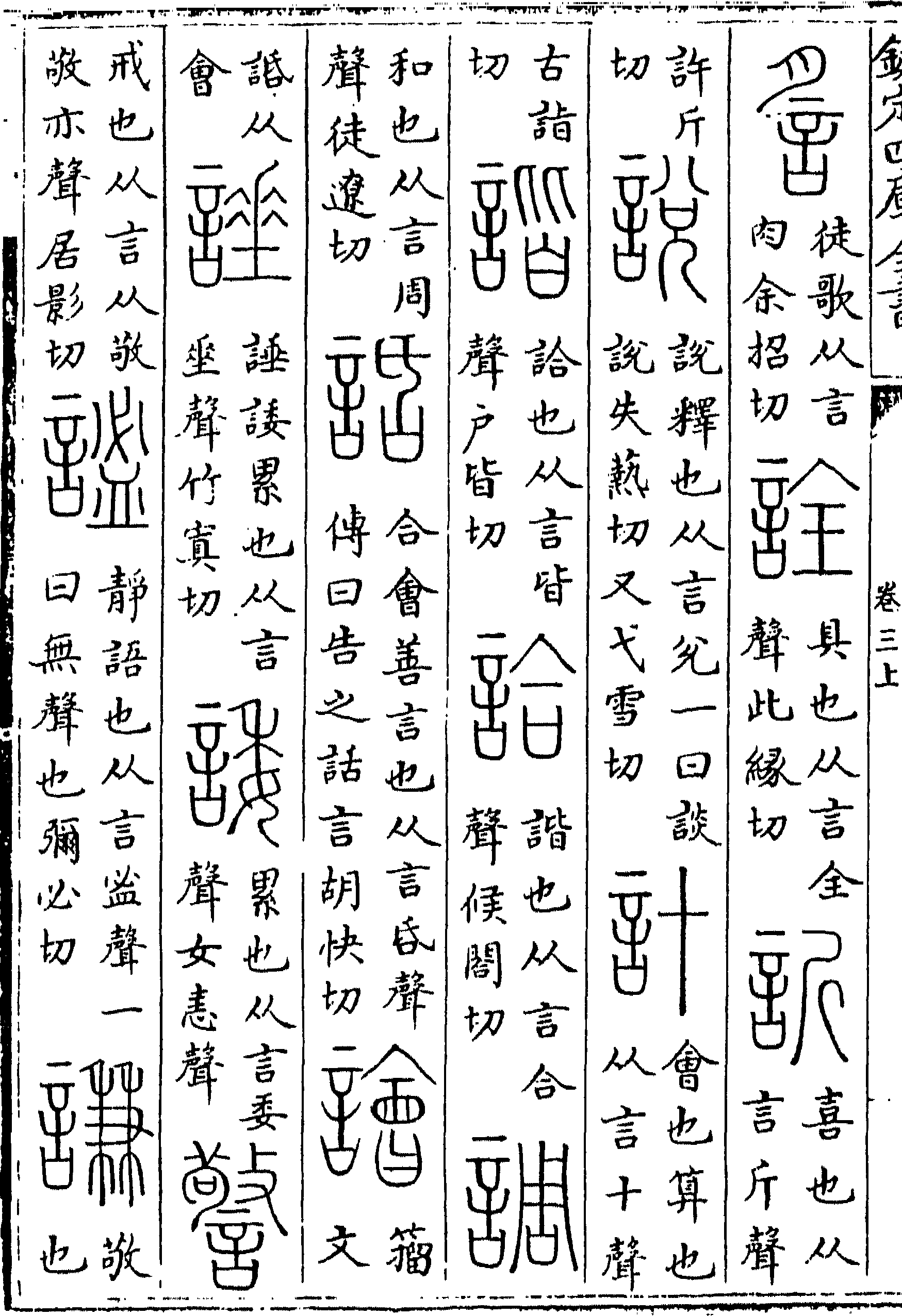
Page from a copy of a Song dynasty edition of the Shuowen, showing characters with the ⾔ 'SPEECH' radical, including 說 shuō

The title of the work is traditionally taken to draw a basic distinction between two types of characters:

- wén 文, characters consisting of a single graphic element (such as the character 文 itself), and
- zì 字, characters composed from multiple elements (such as 字 itself, composed of 宀 and 子).

Thus, according to this interpretation, the work's title would mean "commenting on" (shuō 'comment', 'explain') basic characters, and "analyzing" (jiě 'separate', 'analyze') compound characters. However, this interpretation dates from the Song dynasty, centuries after the work was written. Françoise Bottéro argues that in Xu Shen's original usage, wén refers to characters as purely graphical images, while zì refers to them as graphic representations of spoken words.

Although the "six principles" (liùshū 六書) of traditional character classification had been mentioned by earlier authors, Xu Shen's postface was the first work to provide definitions and examples. However, only the first four of these principles occur in the body of the dictionary.

- Simple indicatives (zhǐshì 指事) are named explicitly in the dictionary by labelling character entries in the typical formula "A is B ... (is) simple indicative" (A B 也...指事 (也)), where B is a definition for the character A.
- Pictograms (xiàngxíng 象形) are similarly labelled with the formula "A is B ... (is) pictograph" (A B 也...象形 (也)).
- Phono-semantic compounds (xíngshēng 形聲) are implicitly defined by the formula "A ... from X, [with] Y sound" (A...從 X, Y 聲), meaning that element X plays a semantic role in A, while Y has a similar pronunciation. In his 10th-century edition, Xu Xuan removed the phonetic marker 聲 in cases where the pronunciations were no longer similar.
- Compound indicatives (huìyì 會意) are rarely labelled directly, but more commonly identified by the formula "A ... from X from Y" (A ... 從 X 從 Y), indicating that character A is obtained through the graphical juxtaposition of X and Y.
- Loangraphs (jiǎjiè 假借) are not new characters, but rather new uses of existing characters, and are never labelled in the dictionary.
- No derived characters (zhuǎnzhù 轉注) are identified by their definitions in the Shuowen.

According to Imre Galambos, the function of the Shuowen was educational. Since Han studies of writing are attested to have begun by pupils of 8 years old, Xu Shen's categorization of characters was proposed to be understood as a mnemonic methodology for juvenile students.

== Textual history and scholarship ==
Although the original Han dynasty Shuowen Jiezi text has been lost, it was transmitted through handwritten copies for centuries. The oldest extant manuscript currently resides in Japan, and consists of a six-page fragment dating to the Tang dynasty, amounting to about 2% of the entire text. The fragment concerns the 木; mù section header. The earliest post-Han scholar known to have researched and emended this dictionary was Li Yangbing (李陽冰; fl. 765–780), who according to Boltz is "usually regarded as something of a bête noire of [Shuowen] studies, owing to his idiosyncratic and somewhat capricious editing of the text".

=== Shuowen Jiezi Xichuan ===
Shuowen scholarship improved greatly during the Southern Tang and Song dynasties, as well as during the later Qing dynasty. The most important Northern Song scholars were the brothers Xu Xuan (徐鉉; 916–991) and Xu Kai (徐鍇; 920–974). In 986, Emperor Taizong of Song ordered Xu Xuan and other editors to publish an authoritative edition of the dictionary, which became the Shuowen Jiezi Xichuan (説文解字繫傳).

Xu Xuan's textual criticism has been especially vital for all subsequent scholarship, since his restoration of the damage done by Li Yangbing resulted in the closest version we have to the original, and the basis for all later editions. Xu Kai, in turn, focused on exegetical study, analyzing the meaning of Xu Shen's text, appending supplemental characters, and adding fanqie pronunciation glosses for each entry. Among Qing-era Shuowen scholars, some like Zhu Junsheng (朱駿聲; 1788–1858), followed the textual criticism model of Xu Xuan, while others like Gui Fu (桂馥; 1736–1805) and Wang Yun (王筠; 1784–1834) followed the analytical exegesis model of Xu Kai.

=== Later and contemporary study ===
While the Shuowen Jiezi has historically been very valuable to scholars and was the most important early source regarding the structure of Chinese characters, much of its analysis and many of its definitions have been superseded by later scholarship, in particular that resulting from the late 19th-century discovery of oracle bone script. It is no longer seen as authoritative for definitions and graphical analysis. Xu lacked access to the earlier oracle bone inscriptions, as well as bronzeware inscriptions from the Late Shang and Western Zhou periods, which often provide valuable insight. For example, Xu categorized 慮 (lǜ 'be concerned', 'consider') under the 思 'think' radical, noting its phonetic as 虍 (hǔ 'tiger'). However, early forms of the character attested on bronzes have a ⼼ 'HEART' signific and 呂 (lǚ 'a musical pitch') phonetic—which is also seen in early forms of 盧 (lǔ 'vessel', 'hut') and 虜 (lǔ 'captive').

The Qing scholar Duan Yucai's annotated Shuowen Jiezi Zhu (說文解字注) is particularly notable, and the most common edition still in use by students.

20th-century scholarship offered new understandings and accessibility. Ding Fubao collected all available Shuowen materials, clipped and arranged them in the original dictionary order, and photo-lithographically printed a colossal edition. Notable advances in Shuowen research have been made by Chinese and Western scholars like Ma Zonghuo (馬宗霍) and Ma Xulun (馬敘倫).

== See also ==
- Kangxi Dictionary
- Shuowen Jiezi (TV series)
