= Chen Ping =

Chen Ping may refer to:

- Chen Ping (Han dynasty) (died 178 BC), minister during the reign of Emperor Gaozu of Han
- Chen Ping (actress) (born 1948), Taiwanese actress
- Chen Ping (Sun TV) (born 1955), chairman of Sun TV in Hong Kong

== See also ==
- Duke Ping of Chen (died 755 BC), ruler of the state of Chen
- Chin Peng (1924–2013), Malaysian politician
