= Chen Ping (Sun TV) =

Chairman of Sun TV in Hong Kong (born 1955)

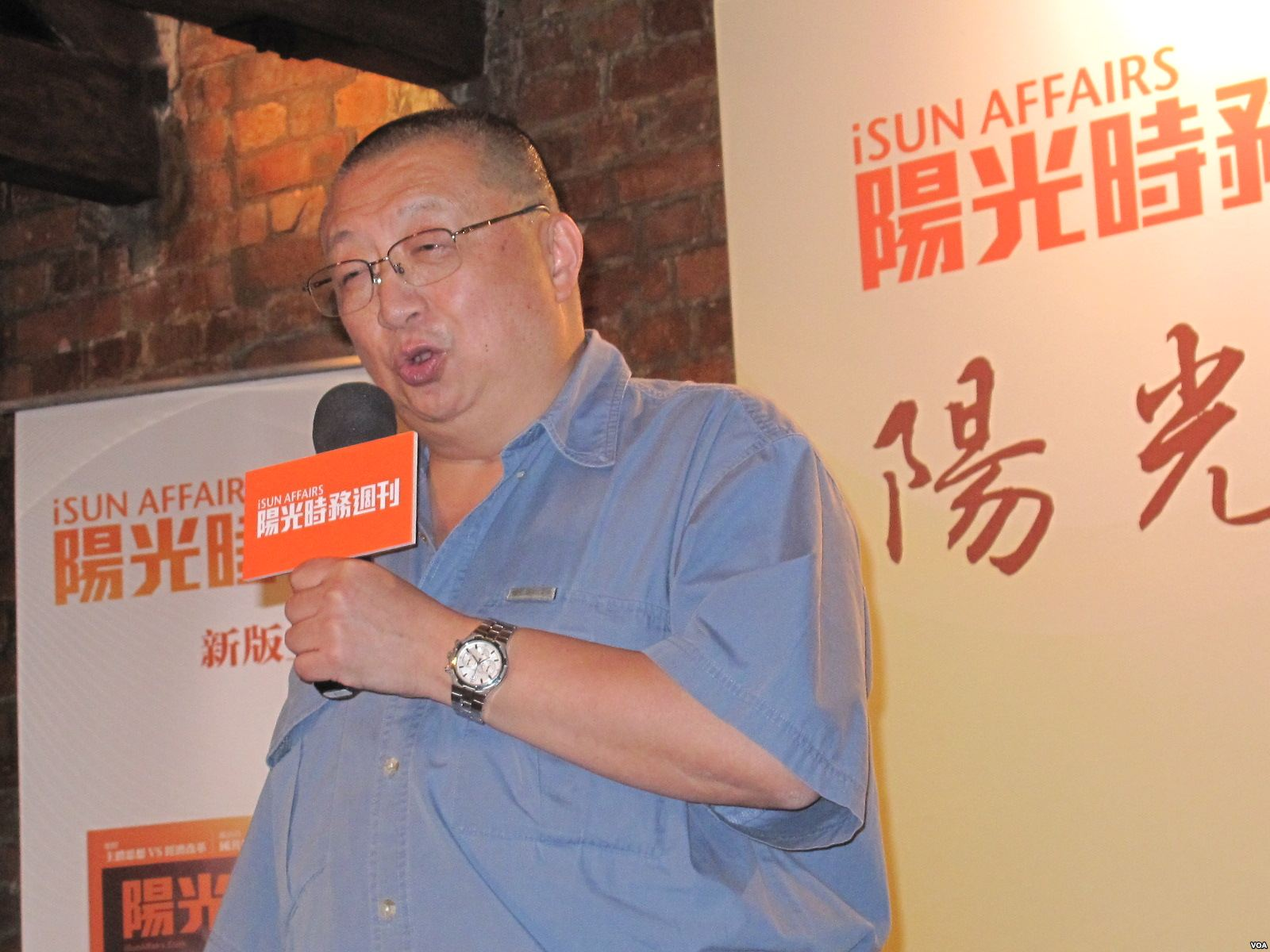
- Chen Ping
- Born: 1955 (age 70–71); Shanghai, China
- Citizenship: China
- Occupations: Businessman, investor, media proprietor

Chen Ping (born 1955) is a Chinese businessman, investor and media proprietor based in Hong Kong. He is chairman of Sun Television Cybernetworks Enterprise Limited and founded iSun Affairs Weekly Magazine in 2011.

== Career ==
Chen graduated from Anhui Mechanical and Electrical Engineering College in 1973. He subsequently became an investor and founded Sun Television in Hong Kong, which launched as a satellite channel in 2000.

In 2011, Chen founded iSun Affairs, a Chinese-language weekly magazine targeting readers in China and Southeast Asia. The publication won awards for its reporting but suspended its print edition in June 2013 to transition to a digital platform.

Chen later co-founded TideBit, a cryptocurrency exchange, through his TideiSun Group.

== Attack ==
On 3 June 2013, Chen was attacked by two baton-wielding men outside the Sino Favour Centre on Yip Street in Chai Wan, Hong Kong. The attackers struck him on the head; he was treated at Pamela Youde Nethersole Eastern Hospital.

At a press conference on 5 June 2013, Chen said the attackers remained silent and he could not identify their motives. He reported suffering from tinnitus as a result. Police said the men had planned an escape route to avoid security cameras. The Oriental Daily News later sent a legal letter to Sun TV requesting removal of an online report; Sun TV declined to retract.
