= Wenzhou city walls =

- 溫州城牆
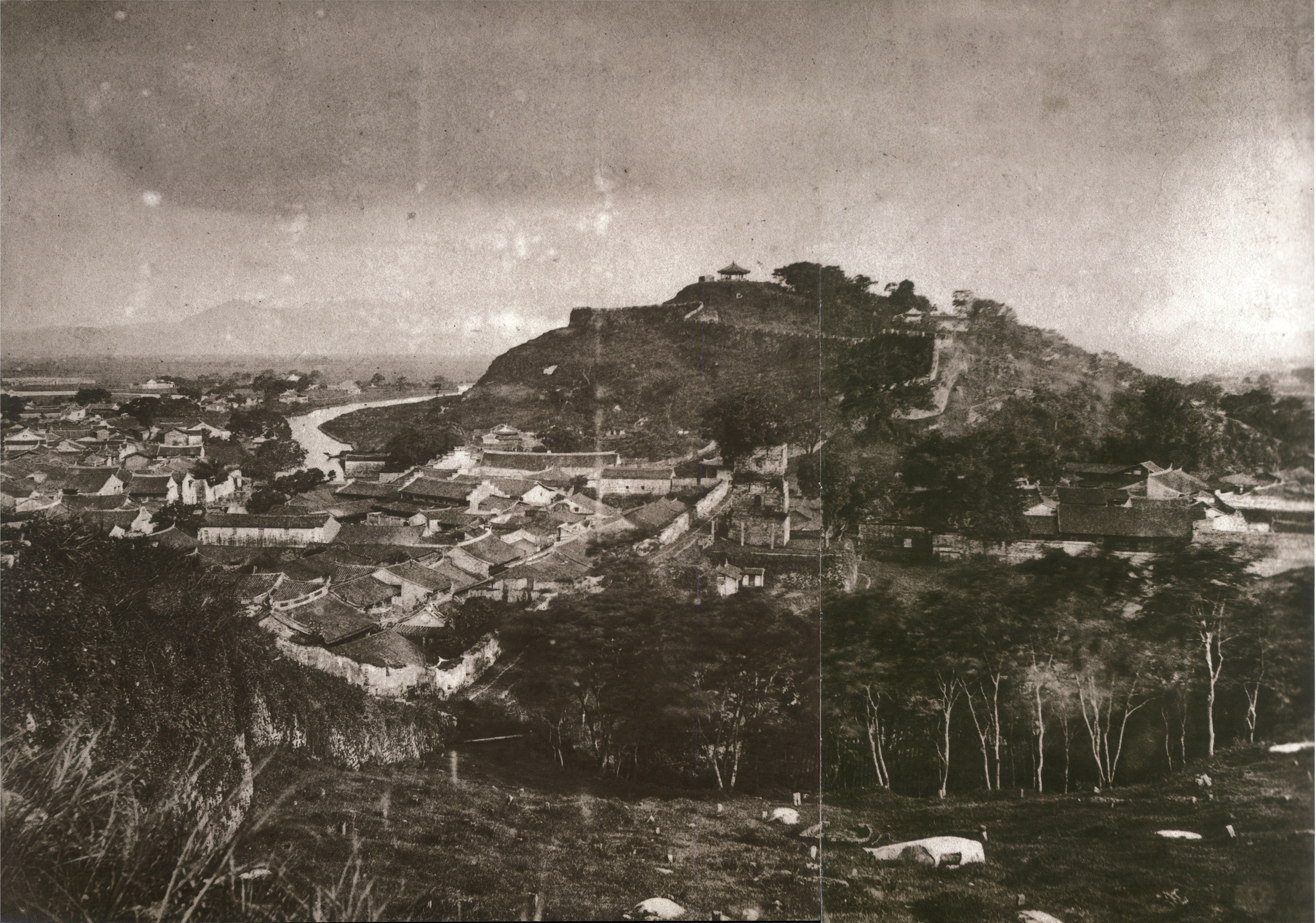
- The eastern city wall of Wenzhou was built along the ridge of Huagai Hill. Photograph by Sir Chaloner Alabaster

General information
- Status: Demolished
- Location: Lucheng, Wenzhou, China
- Year built: 323 AD
- Demolished: 1920s and 1930s

Wenzhou city walls were the defensive walls of Wenzhou. First established after 323 AD, when the southern bank at the confluence of the Ou and Nanxi rivers became the seat of prefectural administration under successive dynasties, including Yongjia Commandery, Wenzhou Prefecture, Rui’an Fu, Wenzhou Circuit, and later Wenzhou Fu, the walls were repeatedly repaired and rebuilt to defend these administrative centres, the walled city defined the historic core of Wenzhou for centuries. Although most sections were dismantled during the 1920s and 1930s, the former walled city continues to constitute the urban core of Wenzhou.

== Main city walls ==
The history of the Wenzhou city walls is traditionally traced back to Guo Pu of the Eastern Jin dynasty. According to legend, after the establishment of Yongjia Commandery in 323, Guo Pu, reputedly skilled in the arts of the Five Elements, astronomy and divination, was invited to select an auspicious site for the construction of the city walls. He is said to have first considered building on the north bank at the confluence of the Ou River and the Nanxi River, but found the soil there too light. Crossing to the south bank, he observed nine hills arranged in a pattern resembling the Big Dipper and therefore chose this location as the city site.

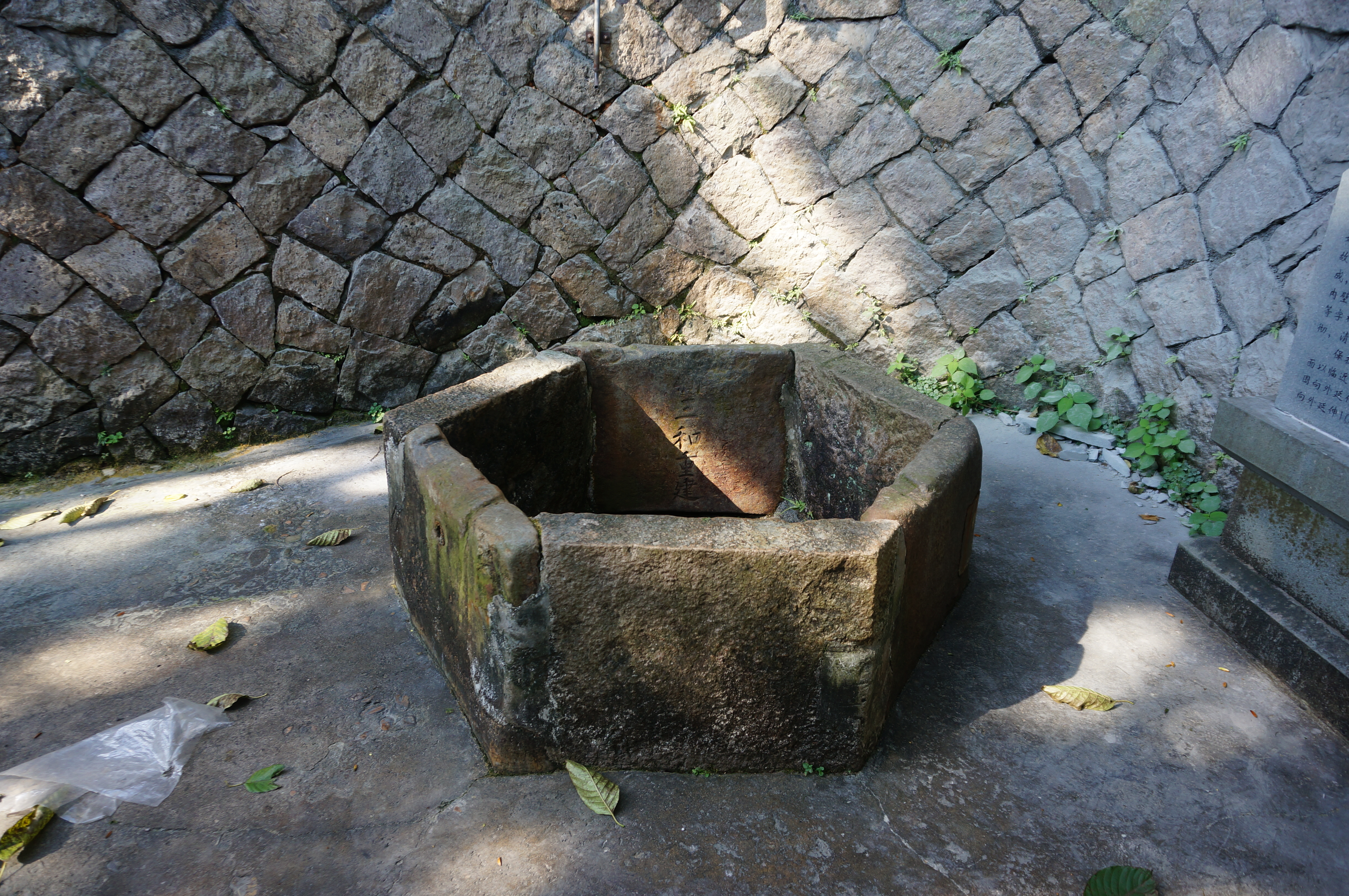
One of the Twenty Eight Mansions wells within the walled city.

The boundaries of the walls were determined in accordance with the surrounding topography. Haitan Hill formed the north eastern corner, Guogong Hill the north western corner, Songtai Hill the south western corner, and Jigu Hill the south eastern corner, while the Ou River served as a natural moat to the north. These four hills were associated with the four stars of the Dipper's bowl, and Huagai Hill was said to “lock” the mouth of the constellation. Additional hills to the south corresponded to the handle of the Dipper, giving rise to the sobriquet “Dipper City”. Within the walls, twenty eight wells were reportedly dug to correspond with the twenty eight lunar mansions. During the construction, an auspicious omen of a white deer carrying flowers was said to have appeared, leading to another nickname, “White Deer City” or Lucheng.

These legends have been widely transmitted, and many local names are said to derive from them, including “Guogong Hill” at the north western corner of the city walls, Lucheng, the present urban core of Wenzhou, and the “Nine Hills Book Society”, a Song literary society in Wenzhou that produced the earliest extant Nanxi play, Zhang Xie the Top Graduate. Some scholars, however, note that while the geographical descriptions in the story, such as the configuration of surrounding hills, may be credible, the account of Guo Pu divining the site did not appear until the Southern Song period and is likely a later legend. In fact, the establishment of a fortified settlement on the south bank of the Ou River may date back earlier, possibly to the Dong’ou Kingdom.

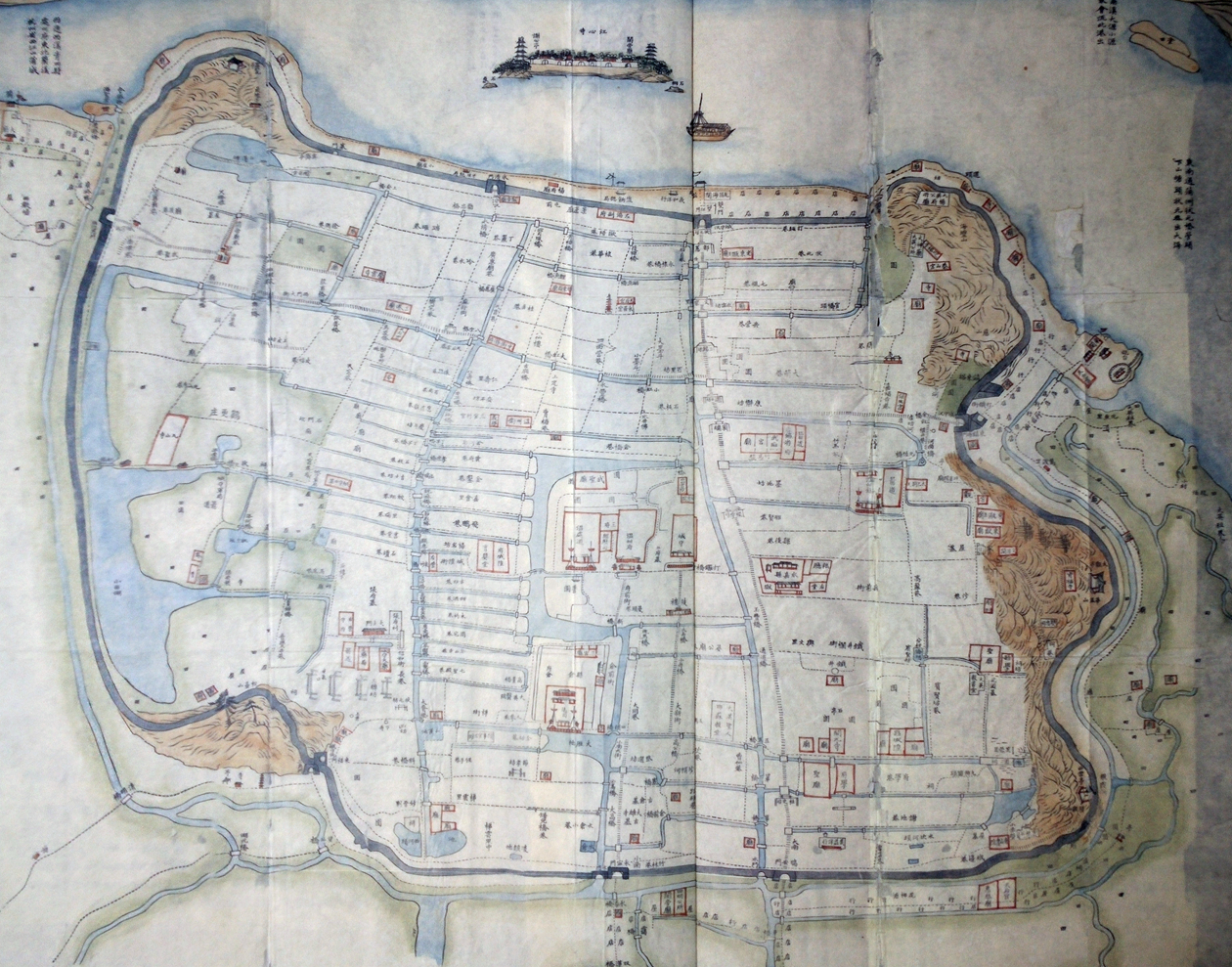
Map of Wenzhou walled city in 1877

After its establishment, the Wenzhou city walls were repaired and reinforced repeatedly in successive dynasties, yet the location and overall extent of the walled city remained essentially unchanged. During the Xuanhe period of the Northern Song, the city successfully withstood the forces of Fang La for more than a month. In the Yuan and Ming dynasties, it likewise repelled repeated attacks by wokou pirates.

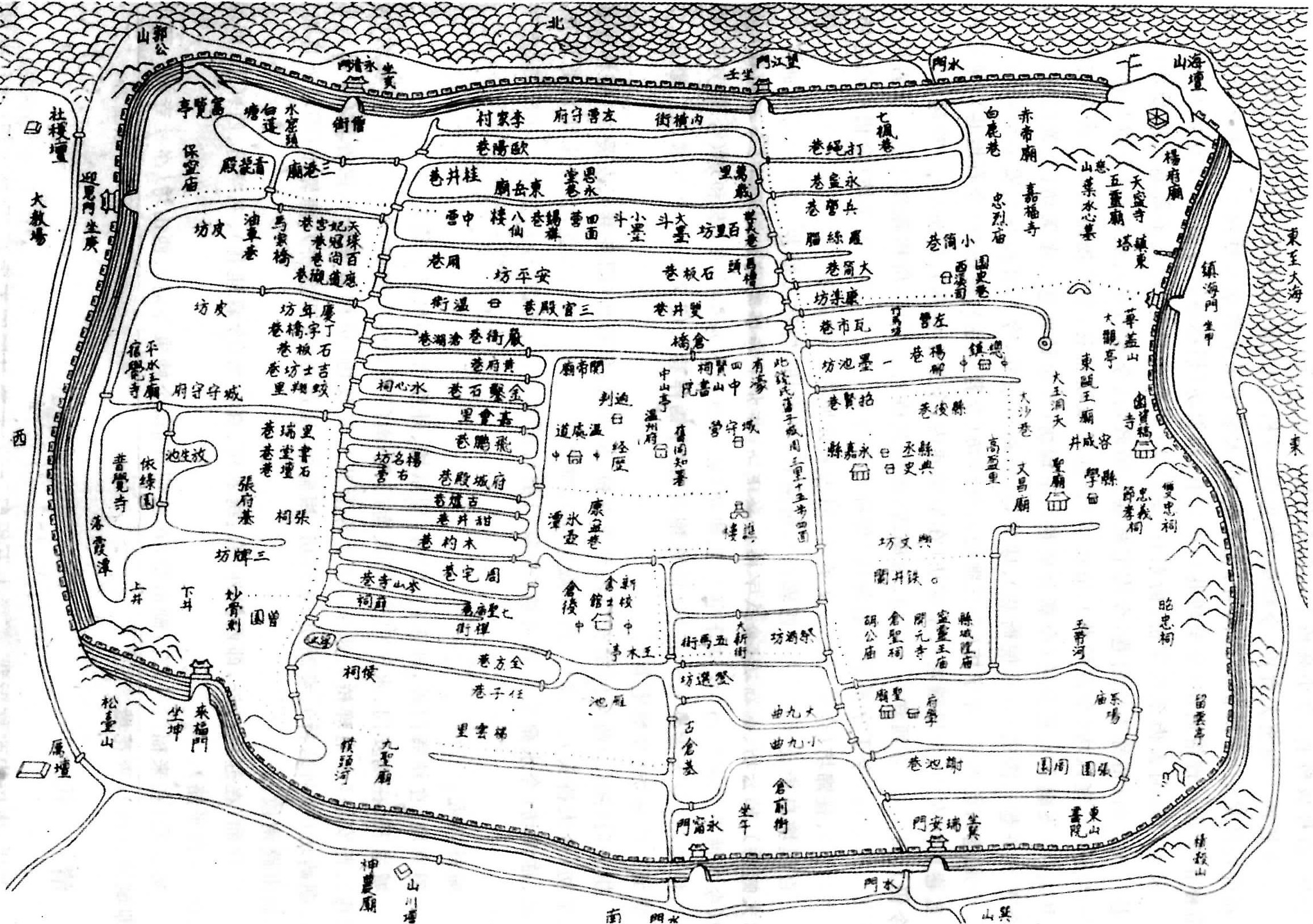
Map of Wenzhou walled city in 1882

In 1927, a section of the city wall between Huagai Hill and Jigu Hill was demolished for the construction of Zhongshan Park. Thereafter, further sections were removed to facilitate road expansion and, during the War of Resistance against Japan, to enable civilian evacuation and protection from air raids. By 1939, most of the walls had been dismantled. The former eastern wall was replaced by what is now Huancheng East Road, the southern wall by Renmin Road, the western wall by Jiushan Road, and the northern wall by Wangjiang East Road. Originally, each side of the walled city was bordered by a moat; today, only the northern side remains as the Ou River, while the moats on the eastern, southern, and western sides have largely been filled in and converted into roads.

In 2004, the remains of a northern city gate dating to the late Tang and Five Dynasties period were discovered at the northern end of Jiefang Street, near the former site of the Wangjiang Gate. Archaeological excavations uncovered sections of the city wall, the gate passage, and associated road surfaces. The site was subsequently reburied for protective preservation.

List of former gates of the Wenzhou walled city
Official name	English translation	Alternative names	Location
镇海门	Zhenhai Gate (lit. 'Gate of Sea Pacification')	宜春门、东门、石窟门	East end of Baili Road
瑞安门	Rui'an Gate (lit. 'Gate of Auspicious Peace')	大南门	Intersection of Jiefang Road and Renmin Road
永甯门	Yongning Gate (lit. 'Gate of Everlasting Peace')	小南门	Intersection of Fuqian Street and Renmin Road
来福门	Laifu Gate (lit. 'Gate of Arriving Blessings')	集云门、山脚门、三角门	Intersection of Laifumen and Renmin Road
迎恩门	Yong'en Gate (lit. 'Gate of Welcoming Grace')	永济门、大西门、西郭门	Intersection of Jiushan Road and Baili Road
永清门	Yongqing Gate (lit. 'Gate of Everlasting Clarity')	麻行门	Jiangxin ferry pier on Wangjiang Road
望江门	Wangjiang Gate (lit. 'Gate of River Outlook')	拱辰门、双门、朔门	Intersection of Jiefang Street and Wangjiang Road

== Inner city walls ==
=== History ===
In 907, when Qian Yuanguan was stationed in Wenzhou, an inner city was constructed with four gates. In 1130, Emperor Gaozong of Song, while fleeing south along the coast to evade Jin forces, first stayed at Jiangxin Temple in Wenzhou and later entered the inner city, using the prefectural office as a temporary imperial residence. In 1276, Wenzhou surrendered along with the Southern Song court at Lin’an. After entering the city, Mongol-led Yuan troops damaged the inner city, leaving only the southern gate intact.

However, the moat surrounding the inner city remained. Thereafter, the administrative offices of Wenchu Prefecture and later Wenzhou Prefecture were located within its bounds. Today, the area has been converted into roads: its eastern boundary lies near present-day Jiefang Street, the southern boundary corresponds to present day Gulou Street and Kangning Road, the western boundary to present day Chengxi Street, and the northern boundary to present day Cangqiao Street.

=== Drum tower ===
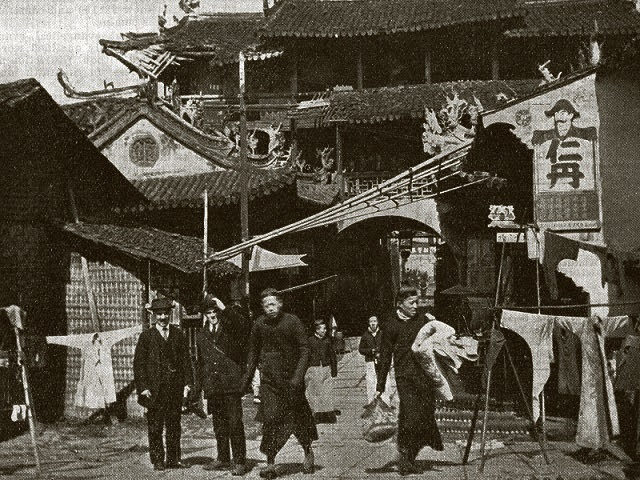
Wenzhou drum tower in 1921

A watchtower, or the Qiaolou, was constructed above the southern gate of the Wenzhou inner city, and the gate therefore became known as the Qiaomen (Watchtower Gate). During the Ming dynasty, a bronze clepsydra was installed inside the tower to regulate the city's standard timekeeping. Drums and horns were also placed there, and were sounded at fixed times each morning and evening. For this reason, the structure was also commonly known as the drum tower. In the Qing dynasty, a Wenchang Shrine was established within the watchtower. To its east stood a Guandi Temple, and to its west an Xuetan Temple.

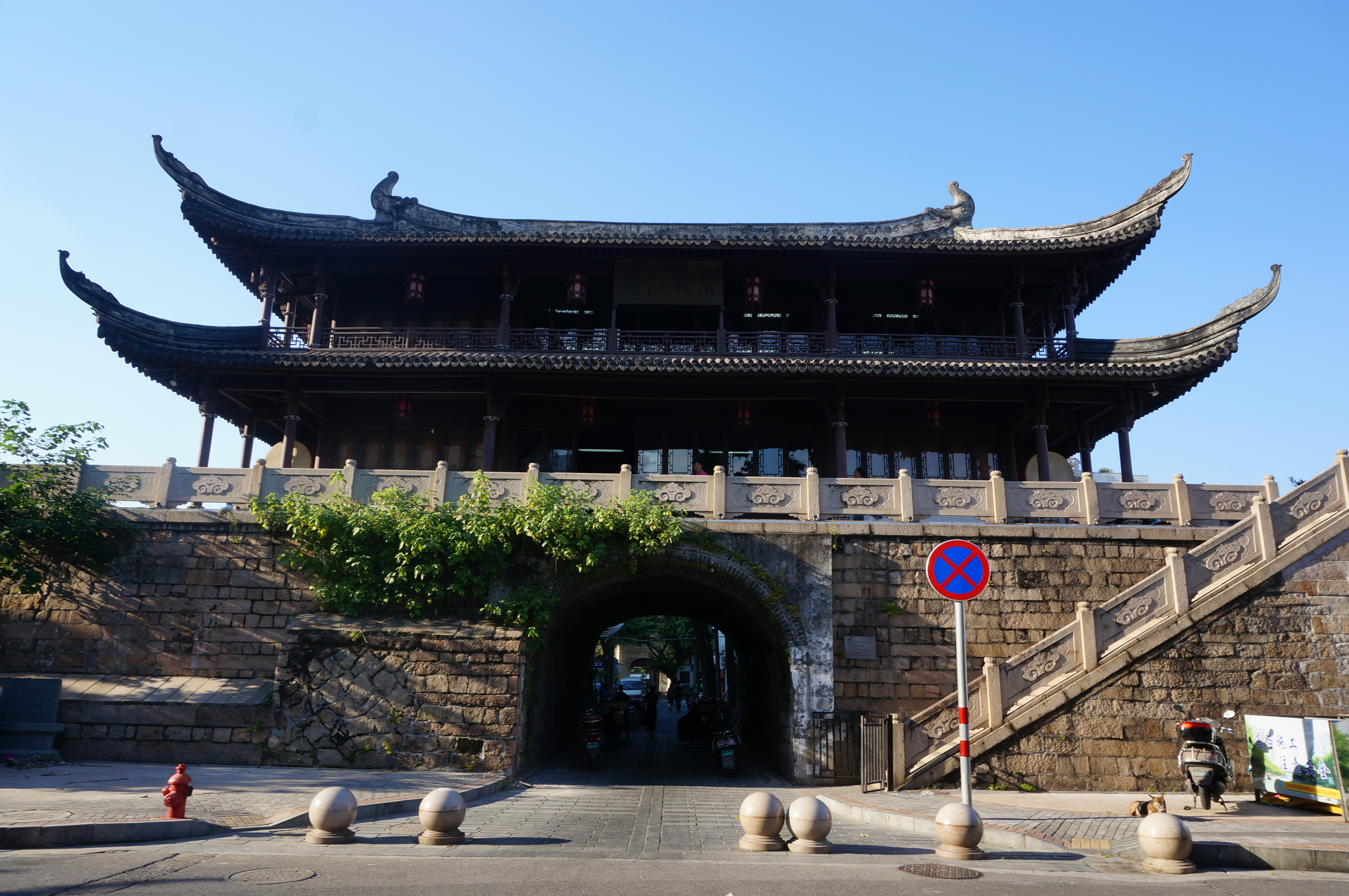
Wenzhou drum tower in 2018

During the Republican era, the gate was remodelled with a brick-and-timber structure built above it. In 1925, it was used as a branch of the Wenzhou Public Library. In 1929, under the initiative of Wang Renju, then director of the Yongjia County Education Bureau, the County Common Education Hall was established in the drum tower, where evening classes, popular science exhibitions, and wartime publicity activities were held.

After 1949, the Qiaolou was altered into a two-storey building and used as residential housing, and was later converted into a canteen for the Municipal Public Security Bureau. In 1991, the municipal government decided to relocate the residents and restore the structure. Wu Shousong, a Wenzhounese businessman based in Taiwan, donated RMB 500,000 towards the project. In 1994, the Qiaolou was rebuilt in a traditional architectural style. In 2011, it was listed as a provincial priority protected site.

In 2013, excavations to the west of the present Qiaomen revealed superimposed remains of the early inner city wall from the Five Dynasties period and the later inner city wall from the Yuan dynasty. The site of the early inner-city Qiaomen gate was also identified, indicating that the gateway had once been shifted approximately 20 metres eastwards. The remains of the gate opening are now covered by a protective structure for conservation and display.
