= Guo Pu =

Chinese writer, historian and poet

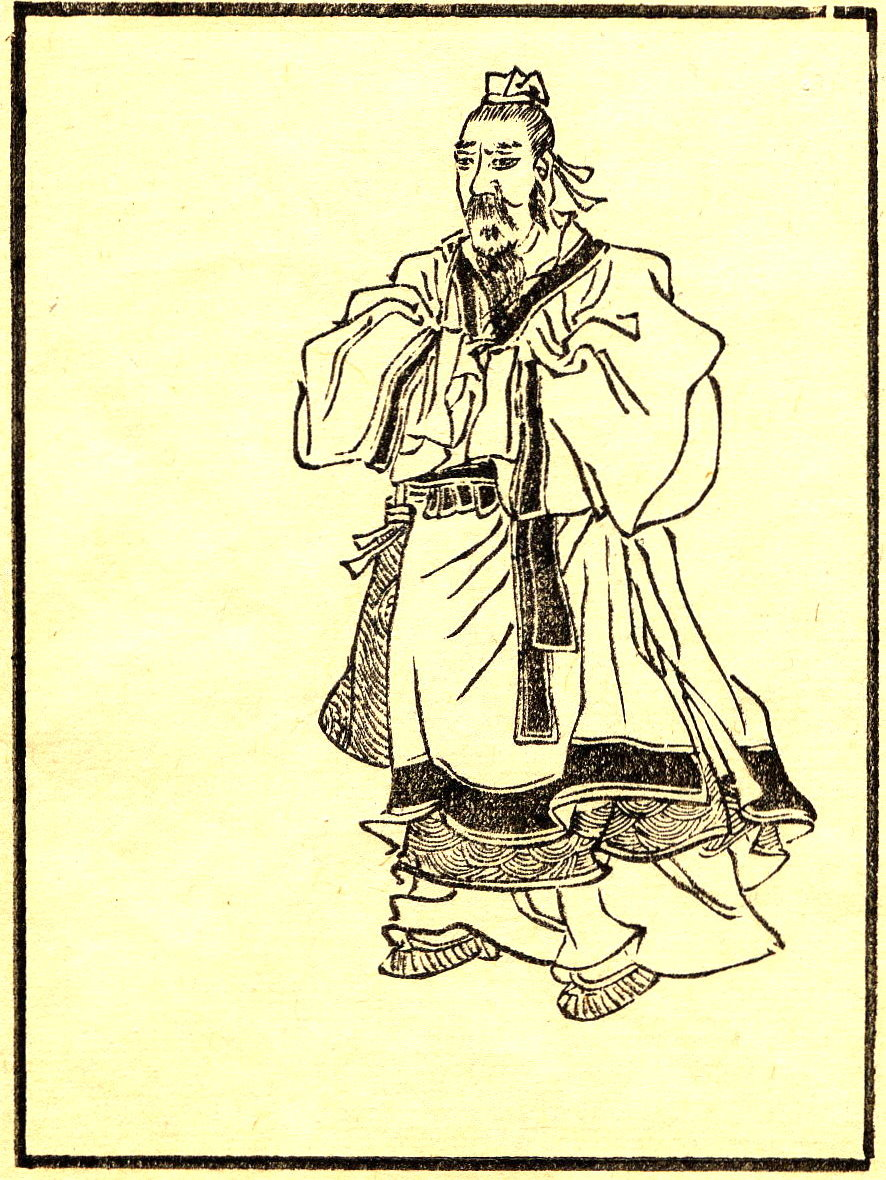
- Guo Pu
- Chinese: 郭璞
- Literal meaning: (personal name)
Transcriptions
Standard Mandarin
- Hanyu Pinyin: Guō Pú
- Gwoyeu Romatzyh: Guo Pwu
- Wade–Giles: Kuo^{1} P'u^{2}
- IPA: [kwó pʰǔ]
Wu
- Romanization: Kueʔ Poʔ
Yue: Cantonese
- Yale Romanization: Gwok Puk
- Jyutping: Gwok^{3} Pok^{3}
- IPA: [kʷɔk̚˧ pʰɔk̚˧]
Southern Min
- Hokkien POJ: Kueh Phok
Middle Chinese
- Middle Chinese: kwak pʰuwk

Alternative Chinese name
- Traditional Chinese: 景純
- Simplified Chinese: 景纯
- Literal meaning: (courtesy name)
Transcriptions
Standard Mandarin
- Hanyu Pinyin: Jǐngchún
- Gwoyeu Romatzyh: Jiingchwen
- Wade–Giles: Ching^{3}-ch'un^{2}
Yue: Cantonese
- Yale Romanization: Gíng-sèuhn
- Jyutping: Ging^{2}-seon^{4}
Southern Min
- Hokkien POJ: Kíng-sûn
Middle Chinese
- Middle Chinese: kjǽng dʒwin

Guo Pu (Chinese: 郭璞; pinyin: Guō Pú; AD 276–324), courtesy name Jingchun (Chinese: 景純; pinyin: Jǐngchún), was a Chinese historian, poet, and writer during the Jin dynasty (mostly Western Jin period, into the Eastern Jin period, from 317–), and is best known as one of China's foremost commentators on ancient texts. Guo was a Taoist mystic, geomancer, collector of strange tales, editor of old texts, and erudite commentator. He was the first commentator of the Shan Hai Jing and so probably, with the noted Han bibliographer Liu Xin, was instrumental in preserving this valuable mythological and religious text. Guo Pu was the well-educated son of a governor. He was a natural historian and a prolific writer of the Jin dynasty. He is the author of The Book of Burial, the first-ever and the most authoritative source of feng shui doctrine and the first book to address the concept of feng shui in the history of China, making Guo Pu the first person historically to define feng shui, and therefore, Guo Pu is usually called the father of feng shui in China.

== Life ==
A native of Wenxi County, in what is now southwest Shanxi Province, Guo studied Daoist occultism and prognostication in his youth, and mainly worked as a prognosticator for various local officials and leaders, interpreting omens and portents in order to predict the success or failure of various endeavors. In AD 307 a Xiongnu clan invaded the area and Guo's family relocated south of the Yangtze River, reaching today Xuancheng and eventually settling in Jiankang (modern Nanjing, Jiangsu). Guo served as an omen-interpreter to military leaders and Eastern Jin chancellor Wang Dao before being appointed to official court positions in 318 and 320. Guo's mother died in 322, which caused Guo to resign his position and spend a year in mourning. In 323 Guo joined the staff of warlord Wang Dun, who controlled much of the modern Hunan and Hubei areas, but was executed in 324 after he failed to produce a favorable omen toward Wang's planned usurpation of the Eastern Jin throne.

== Influence ==
Guo was likely the most learned person of his era, and is one of the foremost commentators on ancient Chinese works. He wrote commentaries to the Chu Ci, Shan Hai Jing, Mu Tianzi Zhuan, Fangyan, Erya, Sima Xiangru's "Fu on the Excursion Hunt of the Son of Heaven", and three ancient dictionaries: Cang Jie, Yuanli, and Boxue. Guo's commentaries, which identify and explain rare words and allusions, are often the only surviving sources of these glosses, and without which leave the original work mostly incomprehensible to modern readers. In particular, Guo's commentaries to the Erya, Shan Hai Jing, and Fangyan are considered sufficiently authoritative that they are included in all standard versions of those texts. Without his glosses and commentaries, large portions of these texts would be unintelligible today.

Guo was also an accomplished poet, and his 11 surviving fu poems display his extensive command of the ancient Chinese language. One of them, entitled "Fu on the Yangtze River" (Jiang fu 江賦), used the image of the Yangtze to praise the restoration of the Jin dynasty, and established his reputation as a leading literary figure. His best known poems are a series entitled "Wandering as an Immortal" (youxian 遊仙), of which 14 survive. The bibliography monograph of the Records of the Sui dynasty list Guo's works in 17 volumes; by the Tang dynasty only 10 volumes remained, and by the end of the Song dynasty all of Guo's writings not included in the Wen Xuan had been lost. All that remains today are his writings from the Wen Xuan and reconstructions from quotations in other surviving works.

Guo Pu is popularly credited in Wenzhou with laying out the former walled city according to feng shui. Local tradition links the walls to surrounding hills and river defences, giving rise to the nicknames “Dipper City” and “White Deer City”, and explains place names such as Guogong Hill and Lucheng, as well as later cultural references like the Song era “Nine Hills Book Society”.Some scholars accept that the topographic details may be plausible, but argue that the Guo Pu attribution appears only from the Southern Song and is likely a later legend; the fortified settlement on the south bank of the Ou River may predate this, possibly back to the Dong’ou Kingdom.
