= Xinan =

Xinan or Xin'an may refer to the following locations in China:

== Xinan ==
- Xinan (西南), region in southwestern China comprising the modern administrative regions of Chongqing, Sichuan, Guizhou, Yunnan, and the Tibet Autonomous Region

=== Towns ===
- Xinan, Shantou (溪南镇), town in Chenghai District, Shantou, Guangdong
- Xinan, Shanwei (西南镇), Guangdong
- Xinan, Xiapu County (溪南镇), Fujian
- Xinan, Zhangping (溪南镇), town in Fujian
- Xinan, Sichuan (西南镇), town in Mianzhuzinan

=== Subdistricts ===
- Xinan Subdistrict, Foshan (西南街道), in Sanshui District, Foshan, Guangdong
- Xinan Subdistrict, Jiexiu (西南街道), Shanxi
- Xinan Subdistrict, Jinzhong (西南街道), in Yuci District, Jinzhong, Shanxi

== Xin'an ==
The following entries are written as "新安", unless otherwise noted:

- Xin'an County, Henan
- Bao'an County, formerly Xin'an County, historical region of Guangdong
- Xin'an Station, station on Shenzhen Metro

=== Subdistricts ===
- Xin'an Subdistrict, Shenzhen, in Bao'an District
- Xin'an Subdistrict, Mudanjiang, in Dong'an District, Mudanjiang, Heilongjiang
- Xin'an Subdistrict, Qitaihe, in Xinxing District, Qitaihe, Heilongjiang
- Xin'an Subdistrict, Shuangyashan, in Baoshan District, Shuangyashan, Heilongjiang
- Xin'an Subdistrict, Wuxi, in Binhu District, Wuxi, Jiangsu
- Xin'an Subdistrict, Huichun, Jilin
- Xin'an Subdistrict, Jilin City, in Longtan District, Jilin City
- Xin'an Subdistrict, Anqiu, Shandong
- Xin'an Subdistrict, Qingdao (辛安街道), in Huangdao District
- Xin'an Subdistrict, Quzhou (信安街道), in Kecheng District, Quzhou, Zhejiang

=== Towns ===
- Xin'an, Lai'an County, Anhui
- Xin'an, Lu'an, in Yu'an District, Lu'an, Anhui
- Xin'an, Maoming, in Huazhou, Guangdong
- Xin'an, Guangxi, in Pingguo County
- Xin'an, Guizhou, in Anlong County
- Xin'an, Langfang (信安镇), in Bazhou City
- Xin'an, Zhengding County, Hebei
- Xin'an, Wuyang County (辛安镇), Henan
- Xin'an, Linli (新安镇), is a town in Linli County, Hunan Province.
- Xin'an, Guannan County, Jiangsu
- Xin'an, Xuzhou, in Xinyi, Jiangsu
- Xin'an, Changling County, Jilin
- Xin'an, Inner Mongolia, in Urad Front Banner
- Xin'an, Haiyang (辛安镇), Shandong
- Xin'an, Jiangyou, Sichuan
- Xin'an, Yibin, in Pingshan County, Sichuan
- Xin'an, Tianjin, in Baodi District
- Xin'an, Zhejiang, in Deqing County

=== Townships ===
- Xin'an Township, Anhui, in Qimen County
- Xin'an Township, Jilin, in Shulan
- Xin'an Township, Yunnan, in Mojiang Hani Autonomous County
