= Piya =

Chinese dictionary compiled by Lu Dian

The Piya (Chinese: 埤雅; pinyin: Píyǎ; Wade–Giles: P'i-ya; "Increased [Er]ya") was a Chinese dictionary compiled by Song Dynasty scholar Lu Dian (陸佃/陆佃, 1042–1102). He wrote this Erya supplement along with his Erya Xinyi (爾雅新義 "New Exegesis of the Erya") commentary. Although the Piya preface written by his son Lu Zai (陸宰/陆宰) is dated 1125, the dictionary was written earlier; estimates around the Yuanfeng era (元豐, 1078–1085), and Joseph Needham says around 1096.

Lu Dian arranged the Piya into 8 semantically based chapters that closely correspond with the last Erya chapters 13–19. The only exceptions are Chapter 5 ("Explaining Horses") that is contained in Erya 19 ("Explaining Domestic Animals") and Chapter 8 ("Explaining Heaven") that anomalously corresponds with the first part of the Erya.

Chapter	Chinese	Pinyin	Translation	Erya Chapter
1	釋魚	Shiyu	Explaining Fishes	16
2	釋獸	Shishou	Explaining Beasts	18
3	釋鳥	Shiniao	Explaining Birds	17
4	釋蟲	Shichong	Explaining Insects	15
5	釋馬	Shima	Explaining Horses	(19)
6	釋木	Shimu	Explaining Trees	14
7	釋草	Shicao	Explaining Plants	13
8	釋天	Shitian	Explaining Heaven	8

The preface explains Lu's motives for defining flora and fauna terminology. Since Song officials changed the basis for the Imperial examination from mastering poetry to jingyi (經義/经义 "expounding on a classical quotation"), literati no longer studied the lyrical names for plants and animals.

== See also ==
- Xiao Erya
- Shiming
- Guangya
