= Guangya =

The (c. 230) Guangya (Chinese: 廣雅/广雅; pinyin: Guǎngyǎ; Wade–Giles: Kuang Ya; "Expanded [Er]ya") was an early 3rd-century CE Chinese dictionary, edited by Zhang Yi (張揖) during the Three Kingdoms period. It was later called the Boya (博雅; Bóyǎ; Po-ya; "Broadened [Er]ya") owing to naming taboo on Yang Guang (楊廣), which was the birth name of Emperor Yang of Sui.

Zhang Yi wrote the Guangya as a supplement to the centuries older Erya dictionary. He used the same 19 chapter divisions into lexical categories, and numerous Guangya entries are abstract words under the first three chapters Shigu (釋詁 "Explaining Old Words"), Shiyan (釋言 "Explaining Words"), and Shixun (釋訓 "Explaining Instructions"). Based upon entries in the Guangya biological chapters, Joseph Needham et al. say most are original and different, showing little overlap with Erya entries, so that Zhang Yi almost doubled the 334 plants and trees in the classic dictionary.

The Qing Dynasty philologist Wang Niansun spent a decade studying this dictionary, and his Guangya shuzheng (廣雅疏證 "Guangya Annotations and Proofs") is still considered the authoritative edition, in which he demonstrated the important philological principle of "looking for the ancient meaning by considering the ancient sound ... not constrained by the structure of the character" (就古音以求古義......不限形體). His preface notes the Guangya has 2343 entries and a total of 18,150 characters (the received text has 17,326), including corrections and emendations, which is about 5000 more than the received Erya. The linguist Zhou Fagao edited an index to the Guangya.

== See also ==
- Erya
- Xiao Erya
- Shiming
- Piya
