= Zhang Yi (Cao Wei) =

- Traditional Chinese: 張揖
- Simplified Chinese: 张揖
Transcriptions
Standard Mandarin
- Hanyu Pinyin: Zhāng Yī

Zhang Yi (fl. 227–232), styled Zhì Ràng (稚让), was a native of Cao Wei of the Three Kingdoms period. He was the author of the Guangya, an early 3rd century CE Chinese dictionary. Around 230 CE, he held the rank of Doctor in the Imperial Academy under Emperor Ming.
