= Shiming =

Early Chinese dictionary (c. 200 CE)

- Traditional Chinese: 釋名
- Simplified Chinese: 释名
- Literal meaning: Explanation of names
Transcriptions
Standard Mandarin
- Hanyu Pinyin: Shìmíng
- Wade–Giles: Shih^{4}-ming^{2}
- IPA: [ʂɨ̂mǐŋ]
Yue: Cantonese
- Yale Romanization: Sīk-mèhng
- Jyutping: Sik1 meng4
Southern Min
- Tâi-lô: Sik-miâ

Yiya
- Chinese: 逸雅
- Literal meaning: Lost Erya
Transcriptions
Standard Mandarin
- Hanyu Pinyin: Yìyǎ

The Shiming, also known as the Yiya, is a Chinese dictionary that employed phonological glosses, and is believed have been composed c. 200 CE. Because it records the pronunciation of an Eastern Han Chinese dialect, sinologists have used the Shiming to estimate the dates of sound shifts, such as the loss of consonant clusters that took place between the Old Chinese and Middle Chinese stages.

== Format ==
The 1,502 definitions attempt to establish semantic connections based upon puns between the word being defined and the word defining it, which is often followed with an explanation. For example, chapter 12 contains:

愛哀也。愛乃思念之也。
Love is sorrow. If you love, then you remember fondly.

Here 愛 (ài 'love') is glossed as 哀 (āi 'sorrow'), which was similar in sound (and still is today). The Chinese call these paronomastic glosses shengxun 'sound teaching', which goes back to the Rectification of Names, which hypothesized a connection between names and reality. The Shiming preface explains this ancient Chinese theory of language.

In the correspondence of name with reality, there is in each instance that which is right and proper. The common people use names every day, but they do not know the reasons why names are what they are. Therefore I have chosen to record names for heaven and earth, [yin and yang], the four seasons, states, cities, vehicles, clothing and mourning ceremonies, up to and including the vessels commonly used by the people, and have discussed these terms intending to explain their origin.

== Authorship and internal organization ==
There is controversy whether this dictionary's author was Liu Xi (劉熙; fl. c. 200 CE) or the more famous Liu Zhen (劉珍; d. 126 CE). The earliest reference to the Shiming is a criticism in the late 3rd-century Records of Three Kingdoms biography of Wei Zhao (韋昭; 204–273); while in prison, Wei wrote a supplement to Liu Xi's Shiming because it lacked information on official titles. The next reference is in the mid-5th century Book of the Later Han biography of Liu Zhen, which notes that he wrote an otherwise unknown Shiming in 30 chapters. The received text has 8 volumes and 27 sections that the Shiming preface, written in Liu Xi's name, calls 27 chapters. Bibliographies in official histories simply listed the Shiming as having eight fascicles without mentioning the number of chapters. The Ming dynasty scholar Zheng Mingxuan (鄭明選; fl. 1572–1620) questioned the difference in chapters and doubted the book's authenticity. The Qing-era commentator Bi Yuan (畢沅; 1730–1797), who published the 1789 Shiming shuzheng (釋名疏證 'Exegetical evidence for Shiming') critical edition, believed that the work was begun by Liu Zhen and completed by Liu Xi who added his preface. Another Qing scholar Qian Daxin (錢大昕; 1728–1804) concurred that Liu Xi was the author based upon studies of his students' biographies. Based on internal evidence Bodman concludes "[i]t is not impossible that Liu Zhen did compose such a work and that Liu Xi might have used some of its material in his work, but the chance of this having happened is very small". The date of the Shiming is almost as controversial as its author. However, it is undisputed that Liu Xi lived at the end of the Eastern Han dynasty and was a refugee who fled to Jiaozhou (present-day Hanoi) from the turmoil between the Yellow Turban Rebellion in 184 and the dynasty's collapse in 220.

List of Shiming chapters
No.	Chinese	Translation
1	釋天; Shìtiān	Explaining Heaven
2	釋地; Shìdì	Explaining Earth
3	釋山; Shìshān	Explaining mountains
4	釋水; Shìshuǐ	Explaining rivers
5	釋丘; Shìqiū	Explaining hills
6	釋道; Shìdào	Explaining roads
8	釋形體; Shìxíngtǐ	Explaining physical bodies
9	釋姿容; Shìzīróng	Explaining appearance
10	釋長幼; Shìzhǎngyòu	Explaining age-group terms
11	釋親屬; Shìqīnshǔ	Explaining kinship terms
12	釋言語; Shìyányǔ	Explaining speech and language
13	釋飲食; Shìyǐnshí	Explaining food and drink
14	釋綵帛; Shìcǎibó	Explaining dyes and silk
15	釋首飾; Shìshǒushì	Explaining hair ornaments
16	釋衣服; Shìyīfú	Explaining clothing
17	釋宮室; Shìgōngshì	Explaining dwellings
18	釋床帳; Shìchuángzhàng	Explaining beds and curtains
19	釋書契; Shìshūqì	Explaining writing and documents
20	釋典藝; Shìdiǎnyì	Explaining literature and art
21	釋用器; Shìyòngqì	Explaining utensils and implements
22	釋樂器; Shìlèqì	Explaining musical instruments
23	釋兵; Shìbīng	Explaining weapons
24	釋車; Shìchē	Explaining wheeled vehicles
25	釋船; Shìchuán	Explaining boats
26	釋疾病; Shìjíbìng	Explaining disease and illness
27	釋喪制; Shìsàngzhì	Explaining mourning ritual

From this table of contents, the Shiming clearly followed the Erya's organization into semantically arranged chapters and all their titles begin with the word shì 'explain'.

== See also ==
- Xiao Erya
- Guangya
- Piya
