= Sun TV (Hong Kong) =

Mandarin satellite television channel based in Hong Kong

SunTV (Chinese: 陽光網視) is a blockchains Chinese movies streaming application that is supported on the system of iOS, Android App, website and TV. Sun TV is a satellite television channel that was launched on August 8, 2000 in Hong Kong. Chen Ping currently serves as the chairman of Sunshine TV, a Chinese television station that primarily airs programs related to history, humanities, finance, current events, and documentaries. The station's ownership changed hands multiple times in the past. The Chinese government-imposed restrictions on the station's signal in mainland China which prevented viewers from directly accessing the station's programs on television and the official website from mainland China. Despite this, various mobile applications still are available for users to access the station's programs and live broadcasts.

It covers a wide range of topics, including art, economics, documentaries, history, entertainment, journalism, design, food, architecture, travel, and more. ISunTV is one of Asia's few non-political media platforms that has approved or produced controversial videos such as 十年, the life of Malaysian politician Datuk Anwar Ibrahim.

The company has offices in Hong Kong, Taipei, and New York City. Currently, membership is only available via invitation.
