= Glossary of Chinese philosophy =

This is a glossary of terminology and biographies related to Chinese philosophy.

== Glossary ==
Note: The alphabetical glossary contains a mixture of Chinese terms (in Pinyin transcription) and Western terms. Entries are sorted strictly alphabetically, which means the order does not always follow the conventional sequence of Chinese vocabulary by Pinyin syllables. Umlauted vowels (e.g., “ü”) are alphabetized according to the standard English alphabetical order, as if the umlauts were not present. Wherever possible, Chinese subject terms ideally are presented with simplified characters, traditional characters, and Pinyin.

=== A ===
Abaev, Nikolai
Nikolai Vyacheslavovich Abaev (1949–2020), Soviet and Russian sinologist and buddhologist and a figure in Zen (Chan)-Buddhism, with Mikhail Titarenko one of the editors of the Russian Encyclopedic Dictionary of Chinese Philosophy (Kitayskaya filosofiya. Entsiklopedicheskiy slovar').

Abel-Rémusat, Jean-Pierre
Jean-Pierre Abel-Rémusat (1788–1832), French sinologist and pioneering scholar of Chinese studies.

Absolute (Buddhism)
Absolute 真如 zhēnrú, the (Buddhist) Absolute; see also Bhūtatathatā.

Academy of Chinese Culture
Academy of Chinese Culture (Zhongguo wenhua shuyuan 中国文化书院), founded in 1984, an academic institution devoted to the study and preservation of traditional Chinese culture.

Ai Siqi
Ai Siqi 艾思奇 (1910–1966), Chinese Marxist philosopher known for his systematic introduction of Marxist theory in China.

Akatsuka Kiyoshi
Akatsuka Kiyoshi 赤塚忠 (1913–1983), Japanese scholar of Chinese philosophy and translator of classical texts.

Alekseyev, Vasily Mikhaylovich
Vasily Mikhaylovich Alekseyev (1881–1951), Russian sinologist, translator, and researcher of classical Chinese literature and art.

Amiot, Joseph-Marie
Joseph-Marie Amiot (1718–1793), French Jesuit missionary to China and translator who helped introduce Chinese culture to Europe.

Analects, The
Lunyu 论语, (Confucian) Analects.

Anarchism in China
Anarchism in China, the development of anarchist ideas and movements in China since the late 19th century.

An Shigao
An Shigao 安世高, Parthian Buddhist monk of the 2nd century and one of the earliest translators of Buddhist scriptures into Chinese.

Apokrypha
See weishu, chenwei. Refers to Confucian apocryphal texts (weishu / chenwei) providing supplementary interpretations of the classics.

Araki Kengo
Araki Kengo 荒木見悟 (1917–2017), Japanese philosopher and historian of Daoism and Chinese intellectual history.

authenticity
authenticity / truthfulness. Sincerity or integrity in Confucian ethics, see cheng 誠 [诚] chéng.

Awakening of Faith in the Mahayana
Awakening of Faith in the Mahayana, Sanskrit: Mahāyāna śraddhotpādaśāstra; 大乘起信論 Dàshéng qǐxìn lùn, influential Buddhist text.

=== B ===
badao
Way of the Despot 霸道 bàdào

Bagchi, Prabodh Chandra
Prabodh Chandra Bagchi (1898–1956), Indian scholar of Sanskrit and Chinese studies, known for his research on Buddhist texts.

bagua
bagua 八卦, the eight symbolic trigrams in Daoist cosmology. See gua.

Baihutong
Baihutong 白虎通, The Comprehensive Discussions in the White Tiger Hall, debates between Old Text and New Text scholars.

Bailianjiao
Bailianjiao 白蓮教, White Lotus School, a syncretic religious movement in China.

Balazs, Étienne
Étienne Balazs (1905–1963), Hungarian-French sinologist specializing in Chinese social and legal history.

Ban Gu
Ban Gu 班固 (32–92), Chinese historian and author of the Book of Han (Han Shu).

Bao Jingyan
Bao Jingyan 鲍敬言 (? 278–342), early Chinese Taoist philosopher known for proto-anarchist ideas.

Baojuan
Baojuan 宝卷, “Precious Scrolls,” a genre of popular religious literature in China.

bashi
bashi 八识 bāshí. Eight Types of Consciousness in Buddhist psychology.

being and non-being
you-wu 有无 [有無] yǒuwú, being and non-being; philosophical concept in Chinese thought.

Belousov, Sergei Romanovich
Sergei Romanovich Belousov (1957–), Russian sinologist and scholar of Chinese philosophy.

benevolence
benevolence, ren 仁 rén, a key Confucian virtue emphasizing humaneness and moral goodness.

Bichurin, Nikita Yakovlevich (Hyacinth)
Nikita Yakovlevich Bichurin (1777–1853), Russian sinologist and translator of Chinese historical and religious texts.

bingjia
bingjia 兵家, School of the Military Strategists, ancient Chinese school of thought on warfare.

Biot, Jean-Baptiste
Jean-Baptiste Biot (1774–1862), French physicist and mathematician who also studied Chinese astronomy.

Blyth, Reginald Horace
Reginald Horace Blyth (1898–1964), British scholar known for his translations of Zen literature.

Bodde, Derk
Derk Bodde (1909–2003), American sinologist specializing in Chinese legal and political history.

Bodhidharma
Bodhidharma, Indian monk traditionally credited with bringing Chan (Zen) Buddhism to China.

body; form
body; form. See xing 形 xíng, the physical or material aspect of a being or object.

Book of Changes
See Book of Changes.

Book of Documents
See Book of Documents.

Book of Lord Shang
Shangjun shu 商君书, “Book of Lord Shang,” Legalist writings attributed to Shang Yang.

Book of Poetry
See Shijing.

Book of Rites of Zhou
See Zhouli 周礼[周禮] Zhōulǐ, Classical text on Zhou dynasty ritual and governance.

Book of Songs
See Shijing.

Borexue
Borexue 般若学, Study of Prajna, the wisdom literature and philosophy in Mahayana Buddhism.

Borokh, Lilia Nikolaevna
Lilia Nikolaevna Borokh (1933–2011), Russian scholar of Chinese philosophy and literature.

Bo Yangfu
Bo Yangfu 伯阳父 (?–?), early Chinese figure of the late Zhou Dynasty, explained earthquakes through the movement of Yin and Yang forces.

Buddhism
Buddhism, religion and philosophy originating in India, emphasizing the path to enlightenment.

Burov, Vladilen Georgievich
Vladilen Georgievich Burov (1931–), Russian sinologist and scholar of Chinese history.

=== C ===
Cai Mo
Cai Mo 蔡谟 (281–356), Jin dynasty scholar and official, known for his Confucian writings and moral integrity.

Cai Shen
Cai Shen [= Cai Chen] 蔡沈 (1167–1230), Song dynasty scholar and government official noted for literary and historical works.

Cai Yuanding
Cai Yuanding 蔡元定 (1135–1198), Song dynasty scholar and official, known for contributions to Confucian thought.

Cai Yuanpei
Cai Yuanpei 蔡元培 (1868–1940), Chinese educator and reformer, president of Peking University, advocate of modern education and academic freedom.

calm
calm 静 jìng. See dongjing 动静, calmness or stillness, often in Daoist or meditative contexts.

Canon of Changes
See Zhouyi, Book of Changes.

Canon of Dao and De
See Daode jing.

Canon of Documents
See Book of Documents.

Canon of Filial Piety
See Xiaojing.

Canon of Mountains and Seas
See Shanhai jing.

Canon of Songs
See Shijing.

Canon of the Great Balance
See Taiping jing.

Canon of the Yellow Emperor’s Inner Medicine
See Huangdi neijing.

Cao-Dong school
Cao-Dong school 曹洞宗 (Cao-Dong zong), one of the major schools of Chan (Zen) Buddhism in China.

Cao Duan
Cao Duan 曹端 (1376–1434), Ming dynasty scholar, historian, and official.

Cause
yuanqi 元气 / 元氣 yuánqì Cause, often in metaphysical or philosophical contexts. See also Mojia.

ceremonies
ceremonies. See li 礼, ritual.

Chan Wing-tsit
Chan Wing-tsit (1901–1994), Chinese-American philosopher and translator of Chinese philosophy, including Confucian and Taoist texts.

Chavannes, Édouard
Édouard Chavannes (1865–1918), French sinologist and epigrapher, known for studies of Chinese history and texts.

Chiang Kai-shek
Chiang Kai-shek (1887–1975), Chairman of the Kuomintang and head of the nationalist government in mainland China and in Taiwan.

Chanxue
Chanxue 禅学 / 禪學 Chánxué, the study and practice of Chan (Zen) Buddhism in China.

Chan school
Chan school 禅宗 / 禪宗 Chánzōng, one of the most influential Chinese Buddhist schools, emphasizing meditation and direct insight.

Chen Chun
Chen Chun 陈淳 (1153–1217), Ming dynasty scholar and poet, part of the literati tradition.

Chen Duxiu
Chen Duxiu 陈独秀 (1879–1942), Chinese revolutionary and co-founder of the Chinese Communist Party.

Chen Fuliang
Chen Fuliang 陈傅良 (1137–1203), Song dynasty scholar and government official.

cheng
cheng 诚 [誠] chéng. sincerity, honesty, or authenticity; a key Confucian virtue.

Cheng brothers
Cheng brothers, Er Cheng 二程, refers to Cheng Yi and Cheng Hao, prominent Song dynasty Neo-Confucian philosophers.

Cheng Hao
Cheng Hao 程颢 (1032–1085), Song dynasty philosopher, elder brother of Cheng Yi, key figure in Neo-Confucianism.

Chengshi school
Chengshi school 成实宗 (Chengshi zong), “School of Understanding the Truth,” a Tang–Song philosophical school emphasizing epistemology and ontology.

Chen Guojun
Chen Guojun 陈国钧 (1926–), modern Chinese historian and scholar.

Cheng Yi
Cheng Yi 程颐 (1033–1107), Song dynasty philosopher, Neo-Confucian thinker, younger brother of Cheng Hao.

Cheng Xuanying
Cheng Xuanying 成玄英 (?–?), early Tang dynasty philosopher and Daoist scholar.

Cheng-Zhu school
Cheng-Zhu school 程朱学派. Cheng [brothers] – Zhu [Xi] school (Cheng-Zhu xuepai 程朱学派), a Neo-Confucian tradition uniting the teachings of Cheng Yi, Cheng Hao (11th–12th c., Luoyang School) and Zhu Xi (12th c., Kaoting School).

Chen Huan
Chen Huan 陳奐 (1786–1863), Qing dynasty scholar and official.

Chen Jian
Chen Jian 陈建 (1497–1567), Ming dynasty Neo-Confucian philosopher.

Chen Jianfu
Chen Jianfu 陳健夫 (1913–), modern Chinese scholar.

Chen Li (1809–1869)
Chen Li 陈立 (1809–1869), Qing dynasty scholar.

Chen Li (1810–1882)
Chen Li 陈澧/陳澧 (1810–1882), also known as Chen Lanfu, Qing dynasty scholar.

Chen Lifu
Chen Lifu 陈立夫 (1900–2001), Chinese politician and Kuomintang leader.

Chen Qitian
Chen Qitian 陳啓天 (1893–1984), Chinese historian and scholar.

Chen Quan
Chen Quan 陈铨 (1903–1969), Chinese scholar.

Chen Que
Chen Que 陈确 (1604–1677), scholar and official of the late Ming and early Qing.

Chen Shouqi
Chen Shouqi 陈寿祺 (1771–1834), Qing dynasty scholar.

Chen Tianhua
Chen Tianhua 陳天華/陈天华 (1875–1905), Chinese revolutionary and writer.

Chen Wangdao
Chen Wangdao 陈望道 (1891–1977), Chinese scholar and translator, first to translate the Communist Manifesto into Chinese.

chenwei
chenwei 谶纬 [讖緯] chènwěi. Prophetic and apocryphal texts in ancient China.

Chen Xianzhang
Chen Xianzhang 陈献章 (1428–1500), Ming dynasty scholar and official.

Chen Yinke
Chen Yinke 陳寅恪 (1890–1969), renowned Chinese historian and philologist.

Chen Yuan
Chen Yuan 陈垣 (1880–1971), Chinese historian specializing in Buddhism.

Chen Zhongfan
Chen Zhongfan 陈中凡 (1888–1982), Chinese scholar.

Chinese Philosophical Society
Chinese Philosophical Society 中国哲学会 Zhōngguó zhéxué huì, society for the study of Chinese philosophy.

Julia Ching
Julia Ching 秦家懿 (1934–2001), Canadian-Chinese scholar of Confucianism, also known as Qin Jiayi.

Christianity in China
Christianity in China, history and development of Christian communities in China.

Chung-ying Cheng
Chung-ying Cheng 成中英 (1935–), modern Chinese-American philosopher, also known as Cheng Zhongying, specializing in comparative philosophy.

Chunqiu
Chunqiu 春秋 Chūnqiū, Spring and Autumns Annals, historical chronicle of the State of Lu.

Classic of the Secret Talisman
See Yinfujing.

Comprehensive Discussions in the White Tiger Hall
Baihutong 白虎通, Po Hu T’ung.

Confucius
Confucius 孔子 Kǒngzǐ, Chinese philosopher and founder of Confucianism.

Couvreur, Séraphin
Séraphin Couvreur (1835–1919), French Jesuit sinologist and translator of Chinese classics.

Cordier, Henri
Henri Cordier (1849–1925), French sinologist and bibliographer.

Creel, Herrlee Glessner
Herrlee Glessner Creel (1905–1994), American sinologist, expert on Confucianism and Chinese philosophy.

Cui Shi (ca. 170)
Cui Shi 崔寔 (?–ca. 170), early Chinese scholar.

Cui Shi (1852–1924)
Cui Shi 崔適 (1852–1924), Qing dynasty scholar and government official.

=== D ===
dade
dade 大德 dàdé “Great virtue,” a moral and ethical concept in Confucianism.

Dai De
Dai De 戴德 (?–?), early Chinese scholar.

Dai Jitao
Dai Jitao 戴季陶 (1891–1949), Chinese politician, revolutionary, and early Kuomintang theorist.

Dai Kui
Dai Kui 戴逵 (? 331–395), Jin dynasty scholar and official.

Dai Sheng
Dai Sheng 戴圣 [戴聖] (?–?), also Xiao Dai (小戴), Han dynasty scholar and Confucian commentator.

Danilevsky, Nikolay Yakovlevich
Nikolay Yakovlevich Danilevsky (1822–1885), Russian philosopher and historian.

Dan Zhu
Dan Zhu 啖助 (724–770), Tang dynasty figure.

dao
dao 道 dào “Way,” central concept in Daoism referring to the ultimate principle of the universe.

Dao'an
Dao'an 道安 (312–385), Buddhist monk and scholar, influential in early Chinese Buddhism.

Daodejing
Daodejing 道德经 [道德經] Dàodéjīng, foundational Daoist text attributed to Laozi.

Daoism
Daoism 道 dào; 道教 Dàojiào, Chinese philosophical and religious tradition emphasizing harmony with the Dao.

Daosheng
Daosheng / Dao Sheng 道生 (? 355–343), early Buddhist scholar in China.

daotong
daotong 道统 [道統] dàotǒng Confucian orthodoxy or lineage of the Way.

Daozang
Daozang 道藏 Dàozàng, Daoist Canon, a collection of Daoist scriptures.

Dark Learning
Dark Learning 玄学 xuánxué. See xuanxue, Neo-Daoist metaphysics.

Dasheng qixin lun
Dasheng qixin lun 大乘起信论, Awakening of Faith in the Mahayana, a key Mahayana Buddhist text.

datong
datong 大同 dàtóng, “Great Harmony,” an ideal political utopia in Confucian thought.

Daxue
Daxue 大学 / 大學 Dàxué. Great Learning, one of the Four Books in Confucianism, focusing on moral cultivation and governance.

Dazangjing
Dazangjing 大藏经 / 大藏經 Dàzàngjīng, Buddhist canon and collection of scriptures.

de
de 德 dé. Morality, virtue, or moral power.

de Bary, Wm. Theodore
Wm. Theodore de Bary (1919–2017), American scholar of East Asian philosophy and Confucianism.

Debate on Problems and Isms
Debate on Problems and Isms 问题与主义论战 (Wèntí yǔ zhǔyì lùnzhàn, 1919).

Debate on Salt and Iron
See Yantie lun 盐铁论, Han dynasty policy debate.

Debate on Science and Metaphysics
Debate on Science and Metaphysics 科学与人生观论战, intellectual debate in China in 1923.

Debate on Socialism 社会主义论战
Debate on Socialism 社会主义论战, political and ideological debate in early 20th-century China.

Deljussin, Lew Petrowitsch
Lew Petrowitsch Deljussin (1923–2013), Russian sinologist.

Demiéville, Paul
Paul Demiéville (1894–1979), French sinologist and scholar of Chinese Buddhism.

Deng Mu
Deng Mu 鄧牧 (1247–1306), Yuan dynasty scholar.

Deng Xi
Deng Xi 邓析 (545–501 BCE), early Chinese philosopher and legalist thinker.

Deng Xiaoping
Deng Xiaoping 邓小平 / 鄧小平 (1904–1997), Chinese revolutionary and paramount leader of the People’s Republic of China.

Deng Xizi
Deng Xizi 邓析子 / 鄧析子, collection of writings attributed to Master Deng Xi.

Dewey, John
John Dewey (1859–1952), American philosopher and educational reformer.

Dharmadhatu
Dharmadhatu 法界 fajie, the Buddhist concept of the “realm of reality.”

Ding Wenjiang
Ding Wenjiang 丁文江 (1887–1936), Chinese geologist and scholar.

Discussion on Democracy and Dictatorship
Discussion on Democracy and Dictatorship 民主与独裁的讨论, see also Chen Zhimai 陈之迈 (1908–1978).

Doctrine of Immortality
Doctrine of Immortality. See xianxue 仙学 [仙學], Daoist studies of immortality.

doctrine of non-interference
doctrine of non-interference; inaction, 无为 [無為] wúwéi, concept of effortless action, see wei.

Doctrine of Principle
See lixue 理学 [理學], Confucian school of idealistic philosophy.

Doctrine of Symbols and Numbers
Doctrine of Symbols and Numbers. See xiangshu zhi xue 象数之学, numerology and symbolism in Chinese thought.

Doctrine of the Heart
See xinxue 心学 / 心學 xīnxué, Neo-Confucian philosophy of the mind/heart.

dongjing
dongjing 动静 / 動靜 dòngjing. The interplay of movement and stillness.

Donglin school
Donglin school 东林学派, Confucian reformist school during the late Ming dynasty.

Dong Zhongshu
Dong Zhongshu 董仲舒 (179–104 BCE), Han dynasty Confucian scholar and political thinker.

Dorofeyeva, Vera Vitalyevna
Vera Vitalyevna Dorofeyeva (1960–), Russian scholar of Chinese studies.

Duan Yucai
Duan Yucai 段玉裁 (1735–1815), Qing dynasty philologist and commentator on classical texts.

Dubs, Homer H.
Homer H. Dubs (1892–1969), American sinologist specializing in Han dynasty history.

Du Guangting
Du Guangting 杜光庭 (850–933), Tang dynasty Daoist scholar and religious writer.

Du Guoxiang
Du Guoxiang 杜国庠 (1889–1961), Chinese scholar and educator.

Du Halde, Jean-Baptiste
Jean-Baptiste Du Halde (1674–1743), French Jesuit geographer and sinologist.

Du Lin
Du Lin 杜林 (?–47), early historical figure in Chinese tradition.

Duoyuan renshilun
Duoyuan renshilun 多元认识论 / 多元認識論 (duōyuǎn rènshilùn), pluralistic epistemology; see also Zhang Dongsun 张东荪 (1886–1973).

Dushun
Dushun 杜顺 [杜順] (557–640), founder of the Tiantai school of Chinese Buddhism.

Du Weiming
Du Weiming 杜维明 (1940–), modern Chinese philosopher, leading figure in Confucian revival.

Du Yu
Du Yu 杜预 [杜預] (222–285), Jin dynasty general and scholar, known for commentary on the Zuozhuan.

Duyvendak, Jan J. L.
Jan J. L. Duyvendak (1889–1954), Dutch sinologist and scholar of Chinese classics.

Du Zichun
Du Zichun 杜子春 (ca. 30 BCE–ca. 58 CE), Daoist immortal and figure in Chinese legend.

=== E ===
Eberhard, Wolfram
Wolfram Eberhard (1909–1989), German sociologist and sinologist, known for his studies of Chinese folklore and popular culture.

Eclectic school
Eclectic school, zajia 杂家 [雜家] zájiā, a school of thought in ancient China combining ideas from Confucianism, Daoism, and Legalism.

effort
effort. Spiritual cultivation or disciplined practice, see gongfu.

eight consciousnesses
eight consciousnesses bashi 八识 [八識] bāshí, the eight consciousnesses in Buddhism.

emptiness
emptiness, a fundamental concept in Buddhist philosophy. See xu 虚 [虛] xū, kong 空 kōng.

enlightenment
enlightenment. See Chanxue 禅学 / 禪學 Chánxué, Chan School, Lingji-School, Liuzu tanjing, Huineng, Zhiyi, spiritual awakening or enlightenment in Buddhism.

erdi
erdi 二谛, “twofold truth,” a Buddhist doctrine distinguishing conventional and ultimate truth.

Ermakov, Mikhail Yevgenyevich
Mikhail Yevgenyevich Ermakov (1947–2005), scholar.

Escarra, Jean
Jean Escarra (1885–1955), French legal scholar and sinologist, specialist in Chinese law and legal history.

European Enlightenment
Enlightenment in Europe in the 17th–18th centuries.

=== F ===
fa
fa 法 fǎ law, principle, or norm; central concept in Chinese philosophy and governance.

Fairbank, John King
John King Fairbank (1907–1991), American historian and leading scholar of modern Chinese history.

Fajia
Fajia 法家 Fǎjiā, Legalist school of Chinese philosophy emphasizing law and statecraft.

fajie
fajie 法界. Dharmadhatu, the “realm of reality” in Buddhist philosophy.

Fan Chi
Fan Chi 樊迟 (515 BCE–?), disciple of Confucius.

Fang Dongmei
Fang Dongmei 方東美 (Thomé H. Fang, 1899–1977), Chinese philosopher, Neo-Confucian thinker, and educator.

Fang Dongshu
Fang Dongshu 方东树 [方東樹] (1772–1851), Qing dynasty scholar.

Fang Keli
Fang Keli 方克立 (1938–2020), contemporary Chinese philosopher.

Fang Litian
Fang Litian 方立天 (1933–2014), Chinese philosopher and scholar of Confucianism.

Fang Yizhi
Fang Yizhi 方以智 (1611–1671), Ming–Qing philosopher and scientist.

Fan Li
Fan Li 范蠡 (?–?), statesman and economist of the late Spring and Autumn period.

Fan Sun
Also Fan Xun 樊逊 [樊遜], military strategist of the Three Kingdoms period.

Fan Wenlan
Fan Wenlan 范文澜 (1893–1969), Chinese historian and author of modern Chinese history texts.

Fan Ye
Fan Ye 范曄 (398–445), historian and author of the Book of the Later Han (Hou Han Shu).

Fan Zhen
Fan Zhen 范縝 (ca. 450–515), Chinese philosopher and critic of Buddhism.

Fan Zhongyan
Fan Zhongyan 范仲淹 (989–1052), Song dynasty statesman, scholar, and reformer.

Faxian
Faxian 法显 (337–422), Chinese Buddhist monk and pilgrim to India.

Faxian zong
Faxian zong 法性宗, Buddhist school related to the Faxing tradition.

Faxing School
Faxing School Faxing pai 法性派, school of Buddhist thought focusing on the intrinsic nature of dharma.

fa·shu·shi
fa shu shi 法·术·势 fǎ shù shì, “Law, Technique, and Power,” a framework in Legalist thought.

Fazang
Fazang 法藏 (643–712), Tang dynasty Buddhist monk, key figure in the Huayan school.

Fedorenko, Nikolai Trofimovich
Nikolai Trofimovich Fedorenko (1912–2000), Russian sinologist.

Fei Gong
Fei Gong 费巩 (1905–1945), Chinese scholar.

Fei Mi
Fei Mi 費密 (1623–1699), Chinese scholar.

Fei Zhi
Fei Zhi 费直 (?–?), early Chinese figure.

Feng Ding
Feng Ding 冯定 (1902–1983), Chinese historian and philosopher.

Feng Guifen
Feng Guifen 冯桂芬 (1809–1875), Qing dynasty reformist and scholar.

fengliu
fengliu 风流 [風流] fēngliú “Wind and flow,” term describing elegance, charm, or cultural refinement.

Feng Qi
Feng Qi 冯契 (1915–1995), Chinese scholar.

Feng Youlan
Feng Youlan 冯友兰 [馮友蘭] (1895–1990), Chinese philosopher and historian of philosophy.

Feoktistov, Vitaly Fyodorovich
Vitaly Fyodorovich Feoktistov (1930–2005), Russian scholar of Chinese studies.

Fishman, Olga Lazarevna
Olga Lazarevna Fishman (1919–1986), Russian sinologist.

Five Classics
Five Classics; Five Canonical Works. See Wujing 五经 [五經] Wǔjīng, the five classical Confucian texts.

Five Elements
Five Elements. See wuxing [1] 五行 wǔxíng, the Five Elements theory in Chinese cosmology.

Forke, Alfred
Alfred Forke (1867–1944), German sinologist.

form
form 形 xíng. The physical or material form in Chinese philosophy.

Four Books
Four Books. Sishu 四书 / 四書 Sìshū, core Confucian texts.

Franke, Otto
Otto Franke (1863–1946), German sinologist and historian of China.

Fu, Charles Wei-hsun
Charles Wei-hsun Fu 傅偉勲 (1933–1996), Chinese-American scholar of philosophy.

Fu Jia
Fu Jia 傅嘏 (209–255), scholar and official of the Three Kingdoms period.

Fukui Kōjun
Fukui Kōjun 福井康順 (1898–1991), Japanese scholar of Chinese philosophy.

Fukunaga Mitsuji
Fukunaga Mitsuji 福永光司 (1918–2001), Japanese sinologist.

Fu Qian
Fu Qian 服虔 (?–?), historical Chinese figure.

Fu Qiubo
Fu Qiubo 浮丘伯, historical figure in early China.

Fu Shan
Fu Shan 傅山 (1607–1684), Ming–Qing scholar and calligrapher.

Fu Sheng
Fu Sheng 伏勝 (?–?), Confucian scholar of the Han dynasty.

Fu Tongxian
Fu Tongxian 傅统先 / 傅統先 (1910–1985), Chinese scholar.

Fu Tun
Fu Tun 腹䵍 (?–?), historical Chinese figure.

Fuxi
Fuxi 伏羲 Fúxī, legendary founder of Chinese civilization and culture.

Fu Xuan
Fu Xuan 傅玄, Jin dynasty scholar and poet.

Fu Yi
Fu Yi 傅奕 (555–639), scholar and official of the Sui–Tang transition period.

=== G ===
Gao Panlong
Gao Panlong 高攀龙 (1562–1626), Ming dynasty painter known for bird-and-flower paintings.

Gaoseng zhuan
Gaoseng zhuan 高僧传, Memoirs of Eminent Monks, biographies of Buddhist monks compiled by Huijiao.

Gaotang Sheng
Gaotang Sheng 高堂生, Confucian scholar of the Former Han dynasty.

Gao Xiang
Gao Xiang 高相, historical Chinese figure.

Gao You
Gao You 高诱 [高誘], Eastern Han scholar and commentator, known for annotating classic texts.

Gaozi
Gaozi 告子, “Master Gao,” early Chinese philosopher and representative of the Gao school of Confucianism.

Gaubil, Antoine
Antoine Gaubil (1689–1759), French Jesuit and sinologist.

Ge Hong
Ge Hong 葛洪 (284–363), Daoist philosopher and alchemist of the Eastern Jin dynasty.

Georgievsky, Sergey Mikhailovich
Sergey Mikhailovich Georgievsky (1851–1893), Russian scholar of Chinese studies.

Gernet, Jacques
Jacques Gernet (1921–2018), French sinologist and historian of Chinese civilization.

Giles, Herbert Allen
Herbert Allen Giles (1845–1935), British sinologist and translator of Chinese classics.

Goldsmith, Oliver
Oliver Goldsmith (1728–1774), Anglo-Irish writer, sometimes referenced in comparative studies of China in the 18th century.

Golygina, Kirina Ivanovna
Kirina Ivanovna Golygina (1935–1999), Russian sinologist.

Graham, Angus Charles
Angus Charles Graham (1919–1991), British scholar of Chinese philosophy and Daoism.

Granet, Marcel
Marcel Granet (1884–1940), French sociologist and sinologist.

Granovsky, Timofei Nikolayevich
Timofei Nikolayevich Granovsky (1813–1855), Russian sinologist and historian.

Great Collection of Scriptures
Great Collection of Scriptures. Dazangjing 大藏经/大藏經 Dàzàngjīng, Ta-ts'ang-ching, the Chinese Buddhist canon.

Great Harmony
Great Harmony. datong 大同 dàtóng, the Confucian ideal of a harmonious society.

Great Learning
Great Learning. Daxue 大学 [大學] Dàxué, one of the Four Books in Confucianism.

Grigoryeva, Tatyana Petrovna
Tatyana Petrovna Grigoryeva (1929–2014), Russian scholar of Chinese culture and history.

Groot, Jan Jakob Maria de
Jan Jakob Maria de Groot (1854–1921), Dutch sinologist and ethnographer.

Grousset, René
René Grousset (1885–1952), French historian specializing in Asian history.

Grube, Wilhelm
Wilhelm Grube (1855–1908), German sinologist and linguist.

gua
gua 卦 guà, trigram or hexagram in Chinese divination.

Guan Feng
Guan Feng 关锋 (1919–2005), Chinese scholar.

Guang Hongmingji
Guang Hongmingji 广弘明集, Expanded Collection for the Propagation of the Light, Buddhist text.

Guan Yinzi
Guan Yinzi 关尹子, “Master Guan Yin,” early Chinese philosopher.

Guan Zhong
Guan Zhong 管仲 (?–645 BCE), statesman and reformer of the State of Qi.

Guanzi
Guanzi 管子, “Master Guan,” influential political thinker of the Spring and Autumn period.

Guiguzi
Guiguzi 鬼谷子, “Master of the Ghost Valley,” legendary strategist and philosopher.

Guliang zhuan
Guliang zhuan 谷梁传, Commentary of Guliang, historical text on the Spring and Autumn Annals.

Guliang Chi
Guliang Chi 谷梁赤, early Chinese commentator associated with the Guliang tradition.

Gulik, Robert van
Robert van Gulik (1910–1967), Dutch sinologist, diplomat, and author of Chinese detective fiction.

gong
gong 共 gòng, generalization or socialization in philosophical context.

gong'an
gong'an 公案 gōng'àn (Japanese Kōan), case stories used in Chan/Zen Buddhist teaching.

gongfu
gongfu 工夫/功夫 gōngfu, skill or mastery achieved through effort.

Gongsun Hong
Gongsun Hong 公孙弘 / 公孫弘 (200–121 BCE), Confucian scholar and official of the Han dynasty.

Gongsun Long
Gongsun Long 公孙龙 [公孫龍], philosopher known for paradoxes of logic and language.

Gongsun Longzi
Gongsun Longzi 公孙龙子, “Master Gongsun Long,” alternative designation.

Gongsun Nizi
Gongsun Nizi 公孙尼子 [公孫尼子], early Chinese philosopher.

Gongyang Gao
Gongyang Gao 公羊高 (?–?), commentator of the Gongyang zhuan.

Gongyang zhuan
Gongyang zhuan 公羊传 [公羊傳], Commentary of Gongyang, interpretive text of the Spring and Autumn Annals.

Gong Zizhen
Gong Zizhen 龚自珍 [龔自珍] (1792–1841), Qing dynasty poet and reformist scholar.

Guojia zhuyi pai
Guojia zhuyi pai 国家主义派, nationalist school of thought in China.

Guo Moruo
Guo Moruo 郭沫若 (1892–1978), Chinese historian, archaeologist, and writer.

Guo Songtao
Guo Songtao 郭嵩焘 (1818–1891), Qing dynasty diplomat and scholar.

Guo Xiang
Guo Xiang 郭象 (252–312), commentator on the Zhuangzi and Daoist philosopher.

Guoyu
Guoyu 国语 / 國語 Guóyǔ, Discourses of the States, classical Chinese text recording speeches of rulers.

Gu Tinglin
Gu Tinglin 顾亭林 [顧亭林], alternative name for Gu Yanwu.

Gu Xiancheng
Gu Xiancheng 顾宪成 [顧憲成] (1550–1612), Ming dynasty scholar and founder of Donglin school.

Gu Yanwu
Gu Yanwu 顾炎武 [顧炎武] (1613–1682), Qing dynasty scholar and philosopher; also known as Gu Jiang 顧絳 or Gu Tinglin 顧亭林.

=== H ===
Haga Koshiro
Haga Koshiro 芳賀幸四郎 (1908–1996), Japanese scholar of Chinese philosophy and literature.

Hackmann, Heinrich Friedrich
Heinrich Friedrich Hackmann (1864–1935), German sinologist and scholar of Chinese texts.

Han Fei
Han Fei 韩非 [韓非] Hán Fēi (3rd century BCE), Legalist philosopher and theorist.

Han Feizi
Han Feizi 韩非子 [韓非子], text attributed to Master Han Fei, foundational in Legalist philosophy.

Hanlin Academy
Hanlin Academy 翰林院, imperial academy of scholars in China, responsible for advising the emperor and compiling texts.

Hanshu
Hanshu 汉书 [漢書] Hànshū, history of the Former Han dynasty.

Hanxue
Hanxue 汉学 [漢學], study of Chinese literature, culture, and philology; Sinology.

Han Ying
Han Ying 韩婴 (?–?), early Chinese scholar and author.

Han Yu
Han Yu 韩愈 (768–824), Tang dynasty Confucian scholar, poet, and essayist.

have or not have
have or not have; being and non-being, see you-wu 有无 [有無] yǒuwú, ontological concept.

he
he 和 hé, “harmony” in Chinese thought.

Heaven
See tian 天 tiān, celestial principle or heaven in Chinese philosophy.

He Changtian
He Changtian 何承天 (371–447), Chinese scholar.

Hediao zhangren
Hediao zhangren 荷蓧丈人, “man carrying a basket on a pole,” figure mentioned in the Lunyu (Analects).

Hegel, Georg Wilhelm Friedrich
Georg Wilhelm Friedrich Hegel (1770–1831), German philosopher, founder of German Idealism.

Heguanzi
Heguanzi 鹖冠子, “Master Heguan,” early Chinese text on philosophy and strategy.

Heidegger, Martin
Martin Heidegger (1889–1976), German philosopher, influential in existentialism and phenomenology.

Hejian Xian wang
Hejian Xian wang 河間獻王, ruler of Hejian, also known as Liu De 劉德.

He Lin
He Lin 贺麟 (1902–1992), Chinese historian and philosopher.

Hengqu School
Hengqu School 横渠学派 / 橫渠學派, school of Confucian thought founded by Zhang Zai.

Hesse, Hermann
Hermann Hesse (1877–1962), German-Swiss writer and philosopher.

He Tang
He Tang 何瑭 (1474–1543), Ming dynasty scholar.

Hetu
Hetu 河图 Hétú, the “River Diagram,” a cosmological diagram in Chinese thought.

Hexagram
Hexagram. See gua 卦 guà, symbols used in the I Ching for divination.

He Xinyin
He Xinyin 何心隐 (1517–1579), Chinese scholar.

He Xiu
He Xiu 何休 (129–182), Han dynasty scholar and commentator.

He Yan
He Yan 何晏 (190–249), Cao Wei philosopher and Confucian scholar.

Honda Wataru
Honda Wataru 本田済 (1920–2009), Japanese scholar of Chinese philosophy.

Hong Liangji
Hong Liangji 洪亮吉 (1746–1809), Qing dynasty scholar and reformist thinker.

Hongming ji
Hongming ji 弘明集, Buddhist collection for elucidation and propagation of the teachings.

Hong Qian
Hong Qian 洪谦 / 洪謙 (1909–1992), Chinese philosopher.

Hong Rengan
Hong Rengan 洪仁玕 (1822–1864), leader and reformer of the Taiping Rebellion.

Hong Xiuquan
Hong Xiuquan 洪秀全 (1814–1864), leader of the Taiping Rebellion and founder of the Taiping Heavenly Kingdom.

Hou Cang
Hou Cang 后苍, historical Chinese figure.

Hou Hanshu
Hou Hanshu 后汉书 [後漢書], history of the Later Han dynasty.

Hou Wailu
Hou Wailu 侯外庐 (1903–1988), Chinese historian and scholar.

hua
hua 化 huà, transformation, change, or metamorphosis in Chinese thought.

Huai Hai
Huai Hai 怀海, Chan Buddhist monk.

Huainanzi
Huainanzi 淮南子, classical Chinese text on philosophy and cosmology.

Huai Rang
Huai Rang 怀让 (677–744), Chan Buddhist master.

Huangdi
Huangdi 黄帝, Yellow Emperor, legendary cultural hero of ancient China.

Huang Gan
Huang Gan 黄幹, historical Chinese figure.

Huangdi neijing
Huangdi neijing 黄帝内经 [黃帝內經] Huángdì Nèijīng, foundational Chinese medical text.

Huangdi Yinfujing
Huangdi Yinfujing 黃帝陰符經 Huángdì Yīnfújīng, or short Yinfujing; Classic of the Secret Talisman

Huang Kan
Huang Kan 皇侃 (487–545), scholar of the Liang dynasty.

Huang-Lao School
Huang-Lao School 黄老学派, early Daoist-Confucian school combining Huang-Lao thought.

Hu Anguo
Hu Anguo 胡安国 (1074–1138), scholar and official.

Huang Wan
Huang Wan 黄绾, historical figure.

Huang Yizhou
Huang Yizhou 黄以周 / 黃以周 (1828–1898), Qing scholar also known as Huang Yuantong.

Huang Zhen
Huang Zhen 黃震 (1213–1280), scholar and official of the Song dynasty.

Huang Zongxi
Huang Zongxi 黄宗羲 (1610–1695), Ming-Qing philosopher, historian, and political theorist.

Huan Tan
Huan Tan 桓谭 (ca. 23 BCE–56), Han dynasty scholar and philosopher.

Huan Tuan
Huan Tuan 桓团 (?–?), historical figure.

Huayan School
Huayan School 華嚴宗/华严宗 Huáyán zōng, Buddhist school of the Flower Garland (Avatamsaka) tradition.

Hu Hanmin
Hu Hanmin 胡汉民 (1879–1936), Chinese politician and Kuomintang leader.

Hu Hong
Hu Hong 胡宏 (1105–1161), Song dynasty scholar.

Hui Dong
Hui Dong 惠栋 (1697–1758), Qing dynasty scholar.

Huilin
Huilin 慧琳 (?–?), Buddhist monk and scholar.

Huineng
Huineng 慧能 (638–713), Sixth Patriarch of Chan (Zen) Buddhism.

Hui Zhouti
Hui Zhouti 惠周惕 (?–?), historical figure.

Hui Shi
Hui Shi 惠施 (? 370–310 BCE), Chinese philosopher of the School of Names (Logicians).

Hui Shiqi
Hui Shiqi 惠士奇 (1671–1741), Qing dynasty scholar.

Huiyuan
Huiyuan 慧遠/慧远 (334–416), founder of the Pure Land school in China.

Hu Juren
Hu Juren 胡居仁 (1434–1484), Ming dynasty scholar.

Humu Sheng
Humu Sheng 胡母生, historical figure.

hundun
hundun 混沌 hùndùn, primordial chaos or cosmic disorder in Chinese cosmology.

hunpo
hunpo 魂魄 húnpò, soul or spirit in Chinese thought.

Hu Peihui
Hu Peihui 胡培翚 (1782–1849), Qing dynasty scholar.

Hu Sheng
Hu Sheng 胡绳 (1918–2000), Chinese historian and politician.

Hu Shi
Hu Shi 胡适 (1891–1962), Chinese philosopher, essayist, and key figure in the New Culture Movement.

Hu Wei
Hu Wei 胡渭 (1633–1714), scholar of the Qing dynasty.

Hu Yuan
Hu Yuan 胡瑗 (993–1059), Song dynasty Confucian scholar.

=== I ===
Ignatovich, Alexander Nikolayevich
Alexander Nikolayevich Ignatovich (1947–2001), scholar.

Inoue Tetsujirō
Inoue Tetsujirō 井上 哲次郎 (1856–1944), Japanese philosopher.

individual nature
individual nature. See xing 性 xìng.

Isayeva, Marina Valentinovna
Marina Valentinovna Isayeva (1959–), scholar.

Islam in China
Islam in China, history of Islam in Chinese context.

Ivanov, Alexei Ivanovich
Aleksei Ivanovich Ivanov (1878–1937), Yi Fengge 伊鳳閣, scholar.

=== J ===
Jaspers, Karl
Karl Jaspers (1883–1969), German-Swiss philosopher and psychiatrist, notable for existential philosophy.

ji
ji 机 / 機 jī, “mechanism” or strategic device in philosophy or military contexts.

Jia Gongyan
Jia Gongyan 贾公彦 [賈公彥], historical scholar.

jian'ai
universal love, Ch. jian’ai 兼爱 / 兼愛 jiān'ài, Mohist doctrine of universal love.

Jiang Weiqiao
Jiang Weiqiao 蒋维乔 (1873–1958), Chinese scholar and educator.

Jiang Jieshi
Jiang Jieshi 蒋介石, Chiang Kai-shek (1887–1975), Chinese nationalist leader and head of the Kuomintang.

Jiang Sheng
Jiang Sheng 江声 (1721–1779), Qing dynasty scholar.

Jiang Yong
Jiang Yong 江永 (1681–1762), scholar of the Qing dynasty.

Jiao Hong
Jiao Hong 焦竑 (1540–1620), also Jiao Zhouhou, Ming dynasty scholar.

Jiao Xun
Jiao Xun 焦循 (1763–1820), Qing dynasty Confucian scholar.

Jia Yi
Jia Yi 贾谊 (200–168 BCE), Han dynasty statesman and essayist.

Jieni
Jieni 桀溺, legendary or historical hermit figure.

Jieyu
Jieyu 接舆, philosopher or historical figure.

jing
jing 精 jīng, “essence” or vital substance in Chinese thought.

Jingling wang Ziliang
Jingling wang Ziliang, Xiao Ziliang / Xiao Yunying (460–494), historical figures.

jingtian
jingtian 井田 jǐngtián, “well-field system,” ancient Chinese land distribution system.

Jingtu zong
Jingtu zong 净土宗, Pure Land School of Buddhism.

Jing Fang
Jing Fang 京房 Jīng Fáng, early Han dynasty scholar and mathematician.

jingji
jingji 经济 [經濟] jīngjì, “economy” or management of resources.

Jingtu zong
Pure Land School 净土宗 Jìngtǔ zōng, Mahayana Buddhist school focusing on Amitabha Buddha and rebirth in the Pure Land.

jingwei
jingwei 经纬 [經緯] jīngwěi, “warp and weft,” metaphorically meaning structure or organizational principles.

jingxue
jingxue 经学 jīngxué, study of Confucian classics and canonical texts.

Jin Lüxiang
Jin Lüxiang 金履祥 (1232–1303), Song dynasty scholar.

Jin Yuelin
Jin Yuelin 金岳霖 (1895–1984), Chinese philosopher and logician.

Jiugong dao
Jiugong dao 九宮道 The Way of the Nine Palaces, Daoist school or system associated with cosmology and ritual.

Jiujing
Jiujing 九经, “Nine Canonical Works,” a term for the Nine Classics of Confucianism.

jiuliu shijia
jiuliu shijia 九流十家 jiǔliú shíjiā, collective term for the “Nine or Ten Schools” of Chinese thought in the Warring States period.

Jiumoluoshi
See Kumārajīva, famous Buddhist translator in China.

jiutian
jiutian 九天 jiǔtiān, “Nine Heavens” in Daoist cosmology.

Jixia Academy
Jixia Academy 稷下學宮 / 稷下学宫 Jìxià Xúegōng, scholarly academy in the State of Qi during the Warring States period.

Jizang
Jizang 吉藏 (549–623), Buddhist scholar of the Sanlun (Three Treatises) school.

Julien, Stanislas
Stanislas Julien (1797–1873), French sinologist and translator of Chinese texts.

Jung, Carl Gustav
Carl Gustav Jung (1875–1961), Swiss psychiatrist and founder of analytical psychology.

junzi
junzi 君子 jūnzǐ, “gentleman” or morally cultivated person in Confucian thought.

Jushe zong
Jushe zong 俱舍宗, Buddhist Abhidharma school, also known as the Kusha School.

=== K ===
Kafarov, Pyotr Ivanovich
Pyotr Ivanovich Kafarov (1817–1878), Russian missionary and sinologist, also known as Palladius.

Kaltenmark, Max
Max Kaltenmark (1910–2002), French sinologist specializing in Daoism and Chinese religion.

Kamata Shigeo
Kamata Shigeo 鎌田茂雄 (1927–2001), Japanese scholar of Chinese philosophy.

Kanaya, Osamu
Kanaya Osamu 金谷治 (1920–2006), Japanese historian and sinologist.

Kang Senghui
Kang Senghui 康僧会 (d. 280), early Chinese Buddhist missionary and monk.

Kang Youwei
Kang Youwei 康有为 (1858–1927), reformist scholar and political thinker of the late Qing dynasty.

Kang Yuzhi
Kang Yuzhi 康与之/ 康與之, scholar or historical figure.

Kaoting School
Kaoting xuepai 考亭学派, Neo-Confucian school associated with Zhu Xi.

Karapetyants, Artemy Mikhailovich
Artemy Mikhailovich Karapetyants (1943–2021), Russian scholar of East Asian studies.

Karlgren, Bernhard
Bernhard Karlgren (1889–1978), Swedish linguist and sinologist, specialized in Chinese phonology.

Karma
principle of cause and effect in Buddhist thought.

Kato Joken
Kato Joken 加藤常賢 (1894–1978), Japanese scholar of Chinese philosophy.

Khomyakov, Aleksey Stepanovich
Aleksey Stepanovich Khomyakov (1804–1860), Russian philosopher and historian.

Kinship of the Three
Kinship of the Three 參同契, foundational Daoist alchemical text, also called “The Kinship of the Three.”

Kircher, Athanasius
Athanasius Kircher (1602–1680), German Jesuit scholar and polymath.

Klaproth, Heinrich Julius
Heinrich Julius Klaproth (1783–1835), German linguist and orientalist.

knowledge and action
knowledge and action; zhi-xing 知行 zhī-xíng, knowledge and action.

Kobzev, Artyom Igorevich
Artyom Igorevich Kobzev (1953–), Russian sinologist.

Kojima, Yuma
Kojima Yuma 小島祐馬 (1881–1966), Japanese sinologist.

kong
kong 空 kōng, “emptiness” in Buddhist and Daoist philosophy.

Kong Anguo
Kong Anguo 孔安国 (ca. 156–ca. 74 BCE), Han dynasty Confucian scholar.

Kong Fu
Kong Fu 孔鮒 (264–208), historical figure.

Kong Yingda
Kong Yingda 孔颖达 [孔穎達] (574–648), Tang dynasty Confucian scholar and commentator.

Kongzi
See Confucius.

Konishi Masutaro
Konishi Masutaro 小西 増太郎 (1862–1940), Japanese sinologist and historian.

Konrad, Nikolai Iosifovich
Nikolai Iosifovich Konrad (1891–1970), Russian sinologist and historian of Chinese philosophy.

Koshin, Pavel Mikhailovich
Pavel Mikhailovich Koshin (1934–2016), Russian scholar of Chinese studies.

Kravtsova, Marina Yevgenyevna
Marina Yevgenyevna Kravtsova (1953–), Russian scholar of Chinese philosophy.

Krivtsov, Vladimir Alexeyevich
Vladimir Alexeyevich Krivtsov (1921–1985), Russian sinologist.

Krol, Yuri Lvovich
Yuri Lvovich Krol (1931–), Russian sinologist.

Krushinski, Andrei Andreyevich
Andrei Andreyevich Krushinski (1953–), Russian scholar.

Krymov, Afanasy Gavrilovich
Afanasy Gavrilovich Krymov (Guo Shaotang 郭少棠) (1905–1989), Russian-Chinese sinologist.

Kryukov, Mikhail
Mikhail Kryukov (1932–2024), Russian sinologist.

Kubo Noritada
Kubo Noritada 窪徳忠 (1913–2010), Japanese sinologist.

Kuiji
Kuiji 窺基 (632–682), Buddhist scholar of the Huayan school.

Kumārajīva
Kumārajīva (343–413) 鸠摩罗什 / 鳩摩羅什 Jiūmóluóshí, translator of Buddhist texts into Chinese.

Kuczera, Stanisław Robert
Stanisław Robert Kuczera (1928–2020), Polish-Soviet/Russian scholar of Chinese studies.

=== L ===
Lacouperie, Albert Terrien de
Albert Terrien de Lacouperie (1844–1894), French orientalist and Sinologist.

Lanciotti, Lionello
Lionello Lanciotti (1925–2015), Italian scholar, specialist in Chinese philosophy.

Land System of the Heavenly Dynasty
Tianchao tianmu zhidu 天朝田亩制度, System of land distribution under the Heavenly Dynasty.

Laozi
Laozi 老子, Master Lao, legendary Daoist philosopher, traditionally credited with the Daodejing.

Lao-Zhuang xuepai
Lao-Zhuang School 老庄学派 [老莊學派] Lǎo-Zhuāng xuépài, school of thought combining Laozi and Zhuangzi teachings.

Lapina, Sinaida Grigorievna
Sinaida Grigorievna Lapina (1934–2018), Russian scholar of Chinese philosophy.

Later Mohists
Later Mohists. See Mojia, philosophical school emphasizing logic, ethics, and social reform.

Law
法 fǎ, Law, rule, or principle in Confucian and legalist thought.

Le Comte, Louis
Louis Le Comte (1655–1728), French Jesuit missionary and scholar in China.

Legalism
Legalism, 法家 Fǎjiā, Chinese philosophical school emphasizing law, order, and statecraft.

Legge, James
James Legge (1815–1897), Scottish sinologist and translator of Confucian classics.

Leibniz, Gottfried Wilhelm
Gottfried Wilhelm Leibniz (1646–1716), German polymath, philosopher, and mathematician, studied Chinese philosophy and Confucian ethics.

Leontyev, Alexei Leontyevich
Alexei Leontyevich Leontyev (1716–1786), Russian sinologist.

Le Shouming
Le Shouming 乐寿明 / 樂壽明 (1935–), modern scholar.

Levenson, Joseph R.
Joseph R. Levenson (1920–1969), American historian specializing in Chinese intellectual history.

Lévy-Bruhl, Lucien
Lucien Lévy-Bruhl (1857–1939), French anthropologist and philosopher.

li
li 理, principle.

Liang Qichao
Liang Qichao 梁启超 [梁啟超] (1873–1929), Chinese scholar, journalist, and reformist.

Liangqiu He
Liangqiu He 梁丘贺 / 梁丘賀 (? - ?), scholar of the Former Han dynasty.

Liang Shumin
Liang Shumin 梁漱溟 (1893–1988), Chinese philosopher and educator.

Liang Wu Di
Liang Wu Di 梁武帝 (464–549), Emperor of the Liang dynasty.

Li Ao
Li Ao 李翱 (772–841), Chinese philosopher and poet of the Tang dynasty.

Liao Ping
Liao Ping 廖平 (1852–1932), Chinese scholar.

Liao Zhongkai
Liao Zhongkai 廖仲恺 [廖仲愷] (1877–1925), Chinese revolutionary and politician.

Li Changzhi
Li Changzhi 李长之 (1910–1978), Chinese scholar.

Li Da
Li Da 李达 (1890–1966), Chinese Marxist philosopher and translator.

Li Dazhao
Li Dazhao 李大钊 (1889–1927), early Chinese Communist leader, executed for revolutionary activities.

Liebenthal, Walter
Walter Liebenthal (1886–1982), German scholar of Chinese Buddhism.

Lie Yukou
Lie Yukou 列御寇/列禦寇 Lìe Yǔkòu, legendary Daoist philosopher, associated with Liezi.

Liezi
Liezi 列子 Lièzĭ, Daoist text and attributed philosopher.

Li Gong
Li Gong 李塨 (1659–1733), Qing dynasty official and scholar.

Li Gou
Li Gou 李觏 (1009–1059), Song dynasty scholar.

Li Guangdi
Li Guangdi 李光地 (1642–1718), Qing dynasty scholar and official.

Li Huang
Li Huang 李璜 (1895–1991), Chinese scholar.

Li Hongzhang
Li Hongzhang 李鸿章 [李鴻章] (1823–1901), Qing dynasty politician and diplomat.

Liji
Liji 禮記 / 礼记 Lǐjì, Book of Rites, an ancient Chinese text detailing ceremonial, social, and governmental norms.

Li Jinquan
Li Jinquan 李锦全 (1926–), Chinese scholar.

Li Ke
Li Ke 李克 (? – ?), politician during the early Warring States period.

Li Kuangwu
Li Kuangwu 李匡武 (1917–), contemporary Chinese scholar.

Li Kui
Li Kui 李悝 (455–395 BCE), early Legalist philosopher of the Warring States period.

Li Lisan
Li Lisan 李立三 (1899–1967), Chinese Communist revolutionary and politician.

Lingbao pai
Lingbao School 灵宝派 [靈寶派], school of Daoist Buddhism.

Linji lu
Linji lu 临济录 [臨済錄], collection of sayings of Linji Yixuan, Chan master.

Linji zong
Linji School 临济宗 [臨濟宗], Chan Buddhist school named after Linji Yixuan (d. 866).

Lin Shu
Lin Shu 林紓 / 林纾 (1852–1924), Chinese translator and scholar.

Lin Zexu
Lin Zexu 林则徐 [林則徐] (1785–1850), Qing dynasty official known for anti-opium efforts.

Lin Zhao'en
Lin Zhao'en 林兆恩 (1517–1598), Ming dynasty Confucian scholar.

liqi
理气 [理氣] lǐqì, regulating the flow of vital forces and removing obstacles (Traditional Chinese Medicine).

Lisevich, Igor Samoilovich
Igor Samoilovich Lisevich (1932–2000), Russian sinologist.

li-shi
理事 lǐshì, principle and phenomena, noumena and phenomena.

Li Tong
Li Tong 李侗 (1093–1163), Song dynasty scholar.

Liu An
Prince Liu An 刘安 (179–122 v.Chr.), prince of the Han dynasty, patron of scholarship.

Liu Baonan
Liu Baonan 刘宝楠 [劉寶楠] (1791–1855), Qing dynasty scholar.

Liu Chang
Liu Chang 刘敞 (ca. 1008–1069), Song dynasty scholar.

Liuchen
Liuchen 六尘 [六塵] liùchén, Buddhist concept of six dusts, six categories of defilements.

Liu Fenglu
Liu Fenglu 刘逢禄 [劉逢祿] (1776–1829), Qing dynasty scholar.

Liu Ji
Liu Ji 刘基 (1311–1375), Ming dynasty scholar and strategist.

Liujing
Liujing 六经 [六經] Liùjīng, six canonical books of Confucianism.

Liu Jun
Liu Jun 刘峻 (462–521), scholar of Southern Dynasties.

Liu Shao
Liu Shao 刘劭 (? - ?), scholar from the state of Wei during the Three Kingdoms period.

Liu Shifu
Liu Shifu 刘师复 [劉師復] (1884–1915), Chinese revolutionary and anarchist.

Liu Shipei
Liu Shipei 刘师培 (1884–1919), Chinese revolutionary and philologist.

Liu Wenying
Liu Wenying 刘文英 (1939–2005), modern scholar.

Liu Yin
Liu Yin 刘因 (1249–1293), Song dynasty scholar.

Liu Xin
Liu Xin 刘歆 (gest. 23 n. Chr.), Han dynasty scholar and astronomer.

Liu Xuan
Liu Xuan 刘炫, Han dynasty legal scholar.

Liu Zongzhou
Liu Zongzhou 刘宗周/劉宗周 (1578–1645), Ming dynasty scholar.

Liu Zongyuan
Liu Zongyuan 柳宗元 (773–819), Tang dynasty poet and philosopher.

Liuzu tanjing
Platform Sutra of the Sixth Patriarch Liuzu tanjing 六祖壇經 Liùzǔ Tánjīng or Tanjing 壇經 Tánjīng, Chan Buddhist text.

Liu Xiang
Liu Xiang 刘向 (? 77 – 6 v. Chr.), Han dynasty scholar and bibliographer.

Liu Yuxi
Liu Yuxi 刘禹锡 (772–842), Tang dynasty poet and philosopher.

Liu Zhi
Liu Zhi 刘智 (ca. 1660 – ca. 1739), Qing dynasty scholar.

Liu Zhuo
Liu Zhuo 劉焯 (544–610), scholar of the Sui-Tang period.

Lixue
Lixue 理学 [理學] Lǐxué, Neo-Confucian school of principle during Song and Ming dynasties.

Li Yong
Li Yong 李颙 (1627–1705), Chinese scholar.

Li Yu
Li Yu 李育, Chinese scholar.

Li Zehou
Li Zehou 李泽厚 (1930–), Chinese philosopher and historian of Chinese thought.

Li Zhi
Li Zhi 李贽 (1527–1602), Chinese philosopher, critic of Confucian orthodoxy.

Lomanov, Alexander Vladimirovich
Alexander Vladimirovich Lomanov (1968–), contemporary scholar.

Lü Cai
Lü Cai 吕才 (600–665), lay Buddhist and court official.

Lü Dalin
Lü Dalin 吕大临 (1040–1092), Yushu 与叔, Song dynasty scholar.

Lu Deming
Lu Deming 陆德明 (ca. 550–630), scholar of the Sui-Tang period.

Lu-gong-wang Liu Yu
Prince of Lu 劉餘; 魯恭王, historical figure of Lu state.

Lu Jia
Lu Jia 陆贾 (240 ?–170 v.Chr.), Western Han statesman and scholar.

Lu Jiuling
Lu Jiuling 陸九齡 (1132–1180), Song dynasty scholar.

Lu Jiushao
Lu Jiushao 陸九韶 (? – ?), Song dynasty scholar.

Lu Jiuyuan
Lu Jiuyuan 陸九淵 (1139–1192) or Lu Xiangshan 陆象山, Neo-Confucian philosopher, founder of Lu-Wang School.

Lü Kun
Lü Kun 吕坤/呂坤 (1536–1618), Ming dynasty scholar.

Lü Liuliang
Lü Liuliang 呂留良 (1629–1683), Qing dynasty scholar.

Lukyanov, Anatoly Yevgenyevich
Anatoly Yevgenyevich Lukyanov (1948–), contemporary scholar.

Lu Longji
Lu Longji 陆陇其 / 陸隴其 (1630–1692), Qing dynasty scholar.

Lunheng
Lunheng 论衡 [論衡], Han dynasty philosophical text.

lunhui
lunhui 轮回 / 輪回 lúnhuí, Buddhist concept of samsara, transmigration.

Lunyu
Lunyu 论语 / 論語 Lúnyǔ, (Confucian) Analects.

Luo Hongxian
Luo Hongxian 罗洪先 (1504–1564), Ming dynasty cartographer and scholar.

Luo Keting
Luo Keting 罗克汀 [羅克汀] (1921–1996), modern Chinese scholar.

Luo Qing
Luo Qing 罗清/羅清 (1443–1527), Chinese scholar.

Luo Qinshun
Luo Qinshun 罗钦顺 (1465–1547), Ming dynasty philosopher.

Luo Rufang
Luo Rufang 罗汝芳 (1515–1588), Ming dynasty scholar.

Luoshu
Luoshu 洛书 [洛書] Luòshū, diagram of the Luo River, see Hetu.

Luoxue
Luoyang School 洛学 Luòxué, intellectual school centered in Luoyang.

Lu Sheng
Lu Sheng 魯勝 [魯勝] (? – ?), Chinese scholar.

Lüshi chunqiu
Lüshi chunqiu 吕氏春秋, Spring and Autumn of Lü Buwei.

Lu Shiyi
Lu Shiyi 陆世仪 [陸世儀] (1611–1672 ?), Qing scholar.

Lu-Wang xuepai
Lu-Wang School, school of Neo-Confucianism based on Lu Jiuyuan and Wang Yangming teachings.

Lu Xiangshan
陆象山, See Lu Jiuyuan 陸九淵.

Lu Xiujing
Lu Xiujing 陆修静 [陸修靜] (406–477), Daoist scholar of the Southern Dynasties.

Lu Xun
Lu Xun 鲁迅 (1881–1936), influential modern Chinese writer and thinker.

Lü Zhenyu
Lü Zhenyu 吕振羽 (1900–1980), modern scholar.

Lü Zuqian
Lü Zuqian 呂祖謙 (1137–1181), Lü Bogong 呂伯恭, Donglai xiansheng 東萊先生, Song dynasty scholar.

Lüzong
Lüzong 律宗 Lǜzōng, Vinaya School, school of Buddhist monastic discipline.

=== M ===
Ma Feibai
Ma Feibai 马非百 (1886–1983), modern Chinese scholar.

Ma Fuchu
Ma Fuchu (1794–1874), also known as Ma Dexin, Chinese scholar and religious figure.

Moyriac de Mailla, Joseph-Anne-Marie de
Joseph-Anne-Marie de Moyriac de Mailla (1669–1748), French Jesuit missionary and sinologist.

Malebranche, Nicolas
Nicolas Malebranche (1638–1715), French philosopher, studied Chinese thought.

Malyavin, Vladimir Vyacheslavovich
Vladimir Vyacheslavovich Malyavin (1950–), Russian scholar.

Manifesto for a Re-appraisal of Sinology and Reconstruction of Chinese Culture
Manifesto for a Re-appraisal of Sinology and Reconstruction of Chinese Culture (Wei Zhongguo wenhua jinggao shijie renshi xuanyan 为中国文化敬告世界人士宣言), manifesto on Chinese culture.

man of noble character; gentleman
See junzi 君子 jūnzǐ, term for a noble or virtuous person; Confucian ideal of the virtuous gentleman.

Maoshan zong
Maoshan School 茅山宗, school of Daoism, see Shangqing School.

Mao Heng
Mao Heng 毛亨 (? – ?), Chinese scholar.

Mao Zedong
Mao Zedong 毛泽东 (1893–1976), Chinese revolutionary and founding leader of the People’s Republic of China.

Mao Chang
Mao Chang 毛苌 (? – ?), historical figure.

Maoshi
Maoshi 毛诗, Mao’s version of the Book of Songs, see Shijing.

Martynov, Alexander Stepanovich
Alexander Stepanovich Martynov (1933–2013), Russian sinologist.

Maslov, Alexei Alexandrovich
Alexei Alexandrovich Maslov (1964–), contemporary scholar.

Maspero, Henri
Henri Maspero (1883–1945), French sinologist and scholar of Daoism.

Ma Xiangbo
Ma Xiangbo 马相伯 (1840–1939), Chinese scholar and educator.

Ma Yifu
Ma Yifu 马一浮 (1883–1967), Chinese scholar and philosopher.

Ma Zhu
Ma Zhu 马注 (1640–1711), Chinese Confucian scholar.

Mazu
Mazu 马祖 / 馬祖, Mazu Daoyi 马祖道一 / 馬祖道一 Mǎzǔ Dàoyī (709–788), Chan Buddhist master.

Meadows, Thomas Taylor
Thomas Taylor Meadows (1815–1868), British diplomat and sinologist.

Mei Ze
Mei Ze 梅赜 (? – ?), scholar of the Eastern Jin dynasty.

Mei Zhuo
Mei Zhuo 梅鷟, Chinese scholar.

Memoirs of Eminent Monks
Memoirs of Eminent Monks Gaoseng zhuan 高僧传, biographies of eminent Buddhist monks compiled by Huijiao.

Meng Ke
Meng Ke 孟轲, see Mengzi 孟子, Master Meng (? 372–289 BCE), Confucian philosopher.

Meng Sheng
Meng Sheng 孟胜 (? – 381 v.Chr.), historical figure.

Meng Xi
Meng Xi 孟喜 (? – ?), historical figure.

Mengzi
Mengzi 孟子 Mencius (? 372 – 289 v. Chr.), Master Meng, Confucian philosopher.

Menshikov, Lev Nikolayevich
Lev Nikolayevich Menshikov (1926–2005), Russian sinologist.

minben
minben 民本 mínběn, "people as root" theory, the people as the basis of effective government.

ming
ming 名 míng, name.

Mingjia
Mingjia 名家 Míngjiā, School of Names.

mingtang
mingtang 明堂/明唐 míngtáng, ceremonial hall.

Mingxiang ji
Mingxiang ji 冥祥记 / 冥祥記 Míngxiáng jì, accounts from the dark realm, author: Wang Yan 王琰 (ca. 454?–520?).

minsheng zhexue
minsheng zhexue 民生哲学, philosophy of people’s welfare, political doctrine of public welfare, see also Dai Jitao.

Miyamoto Shoson
Miyamoto Shoson 宮本正尊 (1893–1983), Japanese scholar.

Mizong
Mizong 密宗 Mìzōng, Esoteric School.

Mo Di
Mo Di 墨翟 Mò Dí (480?–400 v.Chr.), pacifist philosopher, also known as Mozi (Micius).

Mohist School
Mojia 墨家 Mòjiā, Mo School, Mohist School.

Mojia
Mohism 墨家 Mòjiā, Mo School, Mohist School.

Montesquieu, Charles de Secondat, Baron de
Montesquieu (1689–1755), French political philosopher.

Morgan, Evan S.
Evan S. Morgan (1860–1943), scholar of Chinese philosophy.

Morohashi Tetsuji
Morohashi Tetsuji 諸橋 轍次 (1883–1982), Japanese scholar, author of Dai Kan-Wa Jiten.

Mou Zongsan
Mou Zongsan 牟宗三 (1909–1995), modern Chinese Neo-Confucian philosopher.

Mouzi
Mouzi 牟子 (? – ?), Master Mou, Eastern Han scholar.

Mouzi (book)
Mouzi 牟子, Book of Master Mou.

Max Müller
Max Müller (1823–1900), German philologist and scholar of religion.

Munro, Donald J.
Donald J. Munro (1931–), American scholar of Chinese philosophy.

=== N ===
Nakamura, Hajime
Nakamura Hajime 中村 元 (1912–1999), Japanese scholar of Indian and Buddhist philosophy.

name
name. 名 míng, name or reputation.

naturalness
naturalness; ziran 自然 zìrán, naturalness; spontaneity; "self-so".

Needham, Joseph
Joseph Needham (1900–1995), British scientist and historian of Chinese science.

neisheng waiwang
neisheng waiwang 内圣外王, inner moral cultivation, outer kingship.

Neixing
neixing 内省 / 內省 nèixǐng, Self-examination and inner reflection.

Neoconfucianism
philosophical movement in China, synthesis of Confucianism, Daoism, and Buddhism.

Neville, Robert Cummings
Robert Cummings Neville (1939–), American philosopher and theologian.

New Culture Movement
New Culture Movement 新文化运动 [新文化運動] Xīn Wénhuà Yùndòng, Chinese cultural and intellectual movement, early 20th century.

New Learning
New Learning, see xinxue 新学 [新學] xīnxué, Neo-Confucian learning.

Nie Bao
Nie Bao 聂豹/聶豹 (1487–1563), Chinese scholar.

Nirvana
Nirvana 涅槃 nièpán, Buddhist concept of liberation.

Ni Shuo
Ni Shuo 兒说 [倪说] (4th–3rd century BCE?), ancient Chinese text.

Nivison, David S.
David S. Nivison (1923–2014), American sinologist and philosopher.

Nohara Shirō
Nohara Shirō 野原四郎 (1903–1981), Japanese scholar.

Nominalists
see Mingjia 名家 míngjiā, School of Names.

non-self
non-self, see wuwo 无我 [無我] wúwǒ, Buddhist concept of no-self.

Numerology
Numerology 象數之學, study of symbols and numbers.

=== O ===
Ofuchi Ninji
Ofuchi Ninji 大淵忍爾 (1912–2003), Japanese scholar.

Okata Takehiko
Okata Takehiko 岡田武彦 (1908–2004), Japanese scholar.

Ono Jitsunosuke
Ono Jitsunosuke 大野實之助 (1905–1989), Japanese scholar.

Otaki Kazuo
Otaki Kazuo 大滝一雄訳 (1928–), Japanese translator and scholar.

Ouyang De
Ouyang De 欧阳德 [歐陽德] (1496–1554), Chinese scholar.

Ouyang Jian
Ouyang Jian 欧阳渐 (269–300), scholar of the Western Jin dynasty.

Ouyang Jingwu
Ouyang Jingwu 欧阳竟无 [歐陽竟無], see Ouyang Jian 欧阳渐.

Ouyang Sheng
Ouyang Sheng 欧阳生 (? - ?), Chinese scholar.

Ouyang Xiu
Ouyang Xiu 欧阳修 (1007–1072), Chinese historian, poet, and statesman.

=== P ===
pancha-skandha
Five Skandhas. See wuyun 五蕴[五蘊] wǔ-yùn, the five aggregates that constitute sentient beings in Buddhist philosophy.

Pan, Quentin
Quentin Pan (1898–1967) (Pan Guangdan), Chinese sociologist and educator.

Pan Fu'en
Pan Fu'en 潘富恩 (1933–), contemporary Chinese scholar.

Pan Pingge
Pan Pingge 潘平格 (1610–1677), Ming-Qing dynasty Confucian philosopher.

Pan Zinian
Pan Zinian 潘梓年 (1893–1972), Chinese historian and scholar.

Pelliot, Paul
Paul Pelliot (1878–1945), French sinologist and explorer.

Perelomov, Leonard Sergeyevich
Leonard Sergeyevich Perelomov (1928–2018), Russian scholar.

Petrov, Apollon Alexandrovich
Apollon Alexandrovich Petrov (ru) (1907–1947), Soviet scholar.

philosophy of the people's livelihood
minsheng zhexue 民生哲学 [民生哲學]. philosophy of the people’s livelihood; see also Dai Jitao 戴季陶.

Physiocrats / Physiocracy
18th-century economic theory emphasizing natural order and agriculture.

Pi Xirui
Pi Xirui 皮锡瑞 [皮錫瑞] (1850–1908), Chinese linguist and scholar.

Plan of the River
See Hetu Hétú 河图, ancient Chinese diagram linked to cosmology and numerology.

pneuma
Pneuma. See qi 气 / 氣 qì, vital breath or life force in Chinese thought.

Pozdneeva, Ljubov' Dmitrievna
Ljubov' Dmitrievna Pozdneeva (1908–1974), Russian sinologist.

Pokora, Timoteus
Timoteus Pokora (1928–1985), Czech sinologist.

Polo, Marco
Marco Polo (1254–1324), Venetian explorer who traveled to China.

Pomeranzeva, Larisa Yevgenyevna
Larisa Yevgenyevna Pomeranzeva (1938–2018), Russian scholar.

Popov, Pavel Stepanovich
Pavel Stepanovich Popov (1842–1913), Russian sinologist.

Porshneva, Ekaterina Borisovna
Ekaterina Borisovna Porshneva (1931), Russian scholar.

Post-Confucianism
Philosophical movement following classical Confucianism.

Pauthier, Guillaume
Guillaume Pauthier (1801–1873), French sinologist.

Prajna Doctrine
Prajna Doctrine, Buddhist teachings of wisdom.

Principle
Principle li 理 lǐ Principle / Law. Principle, or law in Neo-Confucian thought.

Pure Land School
Pure Land School 净土宗 [凈土宗] Jìngtǔzōng, Mahayana Buddhist school focusing on Amitabha Buddha and rebirth in the Pure Land.

Putidamo
Putidamo 菩提达摩 Bodhidharma, founder of Chan (Zen) Buddhism in China.

Pei Wei
Pei Wei 裴頠 (267–300), Jin dynasty philosopher and scholar.

Peng Meng
Peng Meng 彭蒙 (? - ?), disciple of Mozi.

Peng Shaosheng
Peng Shaosheng 彭紹升 (1740–1796), Qing dynasty scholar and Buddhist thinker.

=== Q ===
qi
qi 气 / 氣 qì, vital energy or life force in Chinese philosophy and medicine.

qi
qi 器 qì, utensil; instrument (refers to a tool, vessel, or specific capability in philosophical or technical contexts)

Qian Dehong
Qian Dehong 钱德洪 (1496–1574), Ming dynasty Confucian scholar and philosopher.

Qian Mu
Qian Mu 钱穆 (1895–1990), prominent modern Chinese historian and Confucian scholar.

Qijing
Qijing 七经 / 七經 Qījīng, the Seven Classics of Confucianism, foundational texts of Chinese tradition.

Qin Guli
Qin Guli 禽滑厘 (ca. 470–400 v. u. Z.), ancient Chinese philosopher.

Qing Pu
Qing Pu 庆普, Qing Xiaogong, Chinese scholar.

qingtan
qingtan 清谈 / 清談 qīngtán, „pure talk“, philosophical discourse emphasizing abstract and speculative discussion, popular in Wei-Jin China.

Quanzhen
Quanzhen [jiao] 全真教, „Perfect Wisdom“, one of the major schools of Daoism, focusing on monastic practice and internal cultivation.

Quesnay, François
François Quesnay (1694–1774), French economist, founder of Physiocracy.

Questions and Answers
Questions and Answers wen-da 问答 [問答] wèn-dá, Chan Buddhist dialogue between master and disciple.

Qu Qiubai
Qu Qiubai 瞿秋白 (1899–1935), Chinese communist leader and intellectual.

Qu Yuan
Qu Yuan 屈原 (348–ca. 278 BCE), poet and thinker from the state of Chu, influential poet and statesman of the Warring States period, attributed author of "Li Sao".

=== R ===
Radul-Satulovsky, Yakov Borisovich
Yakov Borisovich Radul-Satulovsky (1903–1987), Soviet sinologist and scholar of Chinese literature.

Rai Tsutomu
Rai Tsutomu 賴惟勤 (1922–), Japanese scholar of Chinese philosophy.

rectification of names
zhengming 正名 zhèngmíng, rectification of names.

ren
ren 仁 rén, Confucian virtue of benevolence, humaneness, and moral integrity.

Ren Jiyu
Ren Jiyu 任继愈 (1916–2009), Chinese philosopher and historian of Chinese philosophy.

renshengguan
renshengguan 人生观 [人生觀], concepts developed by Zhang Junmai (1887–1969), concept of life view or philosophy of life.

Renxue
renxue 仁学, Doctrine of Reciprocity / Doctrine of Humanity, the study and teaching of humaneness or benevolence in Confucian thought.

Ricci, Matteo
Matteo Ricci (1552–1610), Italian Jesuit missionary and sinologist, known for introducing Western science and Christianity to China.

Riftin, Boris Lvovich
Boris Lvovich Riftin (1932–2012), Russian scholar and historian of Chinese philosophy.

righteousness
righteousness. See yi 义 [義] yì, Confucian concept of righteousness or justice.

Rites of Zhou
See Zhouli, ancient Chinese text describing governmental and ritual institutions.

Rosenberg, Otto Karl Julius
Otto Karl Julius Rosenberg (1888–1919), German sinologist and historian of Chinese philosophy.

Rossochin, Ilarion Kalinovich
Ilarion Kalinovich Rossochin (1707 oder 1717–1761), Russian scholar of Chinese studies.

Ruan Ji
Ruan Ji 阮籍 (210–263), Chinese poet and philosopher of the Three Kingdoms period, member of the Seven Sages of the Bamboo Grove.

Rubin, Vitaly Aronovich
Vitaly Aronovich Rubin (1923–1981), Soviet sinologist and translator of Chinese classics.

Rubruck, William of
William of Rubruck / Rubruquis / Rubruck usw. (13. Jhd.), Flemish Franciscan missionary and traveler to the Mongol Empire.

Rujia; Ruxue
Confucianism 儒家 Rújiā; 儒学[儒學] Rúxué, Confucian school and study of Confucian teachings.

Russell, Bertrand
Bertrand Russell (1872–1970), British philosopher, logician, and social critic.

Ru Xin
Ru Xin 汝信 (1931–), contemporary Chinese scholar.

=== S ===
Saito Akio
Saito Akio 斎藤秋男 (1917–), Japanese scholar of Chinese philosophy.

sanmei
sanmei 三昧 sānmèi, State of meditative concentration in Buddhism.

Samoilov, Nikolai Anatolyevich
Nikolai Anatolyevich Samoilov (1955–), Russian scholar of Chinese thought.

sangang wuchang
sangang wuchang 三綱五常 / 三纲五常, Three fundamental bonds and Five constant virtues in Confucian ethics.

Sanguozhi
Sanguozhi 三国志 Sānguózhì, Records of the Three Kingdoms, historical text covering the late Han dynasty and Three Kingdoms period.

Sanlun School
Sanlun School 三论宗 [三論宗] Sānlùnzōng, Buddhist school of the Three Treatises.

Sanjiao
Sanjiao 三教 Sānjiào, The Three Teachings: Confucianism, Buddhism, Daoism.

Sanqing
Sanqing 三清 sānqīng (Daoismus), Three Pure Ones, highest deities in Daoism.

Sansheng
Sansheng / Sancheng 三乘, Three Vehicles (Buddhism).

Sanshishuo
Sanshishuo 三世说, Teaching of the Three Ages, related to historical and cosmological periods.

Sarton, George
George Sarton (1884–1956), mathematician and historian of science.

Savadskaya, Yevgeniya Vladimirovna
Yevgeniya Vladimirovna Savadskaya (1930–2002), Russian scholar of Chinese literature and philosophy.

Schipper, Kristofer
Kristofer Schipper (1934–), Dutch sinologist and Daoism scholar.

School of Diplomats
School of Diplomats 纵横家 zònghéngjiā, political strategists of the Warring States period (475–221 BCE).

School of Names
School of Names 名家 Míngjiā, School of Names (Logicians).

School of the Military Strategists
School of the Military Strategists Bingjia 兵家 bīngjiā, school of military strategy.

Schwartz, Benjamin I.
Benjamin I. Schwartz (1916–1999), American sinologist and political theorist.

Schweitzer, Albert
Albert Schweitzer (1875–1965), philosopher, theologian, and physician.

Seal of the Unity of the Three
Seal of the Unity of the Three, See Cantongqi 参同契 Cāntóngqì, alchemical and cosmological text attributed to Wei Boyang.

self-examination
self-examination 内省 [內省] nèixǐng, introspection, self-examination.

Sengyou
Sengyou 僧祐 (445–518), Buddhist monk and compiler of biographical records.

Seng Zhao
Sengzhao 僧肇 (384–414), Chinese Buddhist scholar.

Senin, Nikolai Gerasimovich
Nikolai Gerasimovich Senin (1918–2001), Russian scholar of Chinese philosophy.

Shangdi
Shangdi 上帝 Shàngdì, "Supreme Deity" or "Highest Sovereign" in Chinese culture.

Shangjunshu
Shangjunshu 商君书 [商君書], Book of Lord Shang, Legalist text attributed to Shang Yang.

Shangqing School
Shangqing School 上清派, Daoist school of the Highest Clarity.

Shangshu
Shangshu 尚书 [尚書] Shàngshū, Book of Documents, ancient Chinese historical texts.

Shanhai jing
Shanhai jing 山海經 / 山海经 Shānhǎijīng, Classic of Mountains and Seas, a mytho-geographical text.

Shang Yang
Shang Yang 商鞅 (? 390–338 BCE), Legalist reformer of the State of Qin.

Shao Jinhan
Shao Jinhan 邵晋涵 (1743–1796), Chinese scholar and historian.

Shao Yong
Shao Yong 邵雍 (1011–1077), Song dynasty philosopher and cosmologist.

Shchutsky, Julian Konstantinovich
Julian Konstantinovich Shchutsky (1897–1938), Russian sinologist.

shen
shen 神 shén, Spirit or mind in Chinese thought.

Shen Buhai
Shen Buhai 申不害 (c. 385–337 BCE), Legalist philosopher and statesman.

Shenbumie
Shenbumie 神不灭 / 神不滅, Indestructibility of the soul.

Shen Dao
Shen Dao 慎到 Shèn Dào, Legalist philosopher of the State of Zhao.

shendu
shendu 慎独 [慎獨] shèndú, Practice of self-discipline in solitude.

sheng
sheng 圣[聖] shèng, Perfect or complete wisdom, often associated with sagehood.

Shen-gong
Shen-gong 申培公 (219–135 BCE), official of the Western Han dynasty.

Shen Hui
Shen Hui 神会 (686–760), Chan Buddhist master.

Shenmie lun
Shenmie lun 神灭论, Treatise on the destruction of the soul by Fan Zhen.

Shen Xiu
Shen Xiu 神秀 (606–706), Chan Buddhist master.

Shen Yue
Shen Yue 沈约 [沈約] (441–513), scholar from Wuxing region (Zhejiang).

Shtein, Viktor Morisovich
Viktor Morisovich Shtein (1890–1964), Russian scholar.

Shtukin, Alexei Alexandrovich
Alexei Alexandrovich Shtukin (1904–1964), Russian sinologist.

Shi Bo
Shi Bo 史伯, Historian Bo, 8th century BCE.

Shi Chou
Shi Chou 施雠 (? – ?), historical figure.

Shiji
Shiji 史记 [史記] Shǐjì, Records of the Grand Historian by Sima Qian.

Shi Jie
Shi Jie 石介 (1005–1045), Song dynasty scholar.

Shijing
Shijing 诗经 / 詩經 Shījīng, Book of Songs, ancient Chinese poetry collection.

Shi Jiao
Shi Jiao 尸佼 (390–330 BCE), Legalist scholar (Master Shi 尸子).

Shi Mo
Shi Mo 史墨, Cai Mo, 8th century BCE.

Shisanjing
Shisanjing 十三经 [十三經], Thirteen Classics of Chinese literature.

Shishuo xinyu
Shishuo xinyu 世说新语 [世說新語], New Account of the Tales of the World, collection of anecdotes and sayings.

Shi'er yinyuan
Shi'er yinyuan 十二因缘, Twelve Nidanas in Buddhist doctrine.

Shi'er jing
Shi'er jing 十二经, Twelve Classics.

Shujing
Shujing 书经 / 書經 Shūjīng, Book of Documents, ancient Chinese historical text.

Shunyata
Shunyata, Buddhist concept of emptiness. See kong 空 kōng.

Shu Xing
Shu Xing 叔兴, 7th century BCE minister of the State of Song during the Zhou dynasty.

Siku quanshu
Siku quanshu 四库全书, Complete Library of the Four Treasuries, largest collection of Chinese literature.

Sima Guang
Sima Guang 司马光 (1019–1086), Song dynasty historian and statesman.

Sima Tan
Sima Tan 司马谈 (? – 110 BCE), historian and father of Sima Qian.

Sima Qian
Sima Qian 司马迁 (145–86 BCE), author of the Shiji, Records of the Grand Historian.

Si-Meng xuepai
Zisi-Mengzi School 思孟学派 / Si-Meng school, Philosophical school following Zisi and Mengzi.

sincerity
sincerity. See cheng.

Sinin, Sergei Vasilievich
Sergei Vasilievich Sinin (1957–), Russian scholar specializing in Chinese legal and historical studies.

Sishu
Sishu 四书 [四書] Sìshū, foundational Confucian texts.

Sivin, Nathan
Nathan Sivin (1931–), historian of Chinese science and technology.

Solovyov, Vladimir Sergeyevich
Vladimir Sergeyevich Solovyov (1853–1900), Russian philosopher and theologian.

Song Xiangfeng
Song Xiangfeng 宋翔鳳 (1779–1860), Chinese scholar.

Song Jian
Song Jian 宋钘 (? 382–300 BCE), Chinese philosopher.

Song-Yin School
Song-Yin School 宋尹学派 Sòng-Yǐn xuépài, Song-Yin philosophical school.

soul
soul (魂魄 húnpò), the dual soul concept in Chinese belief.

space–time
space–time. The concept of space and time, cosmos. See yuzhou 宇宙 yǔzhòu.

Spirin, Vladimir Semyonovich
Vladimir Semyonovich Spirin (1929–2002), Russian sinologist and Daoism scholar.

spontaneity
spontaneity; ziran 自然 zìrán, naturalness; spontaneity.

Spring and Autumn Annals
Spring and Autumn Annals 春秋 Chūnqiū, historical annals of the state of Lu.

Spring and Autumn of Lü Buwei
Spring and Autumn of Lü Buwei Lüshi chunqiu 呂氏春秋 Lǚchūn qiūshì, encyclopedic compendium of political philosophy.

Staburova, Elena Yuryevna
Elena Yuryevna Staburova (1934–1993), Russian sinologist.

State socialism
National socialism 国家社会 guójiā shèhuì, “State socialism/national socialism,” see also Nationalist School.

substance and function
substance and function, see ti-yong 体用/體用 tǐ-yòng, concept of substance and function in Chinese philosophy.

Sucharchuk, Grigori Dmitrievich
Grigori Dmitrievich Sucharchuk (1927–), Russian scholar.

Sun Bin
Sun Bin 孙膑 [孫臏] (? – ?), military strategist.

Sun Chuo
Sun Chuo 孙绰 [孫綽] (310 or 314–371), poet and scholar.

Sun Fu
Sun Fu 孙复 (992–1057), scholar.

Sun Qifeng
Sun Qifeng 孙奇逢 (1585–1675), Confucian scholar and educator.

Sun Sheng
Sun Sheng 孙盛 (306–378), historian and scholar.

Sun Shi
Sun Shi 孙奭/孫奭 (962–1033), Song dynasty scholar.

Sun Shuping
Sun Shuping 孙叔平 (1905–1983), modern Chinese scholar.

Sun Wu
Sun Wu 孙武 (? – ?), military strategist, author of Sunzi Bingfa (The Art of War).

Sun Yan
Sun Yan 孙炎 [孫炎] (3rd century), Also Sun Shuran, historical figure.

Sun Yat-sen
Sun Yat-sen 孙中山 (1866–1925), Chinese revolutionary and founding father of the Republic of China.

Sun Yirang
Sun Yirang 孙诒让 (1848–1908), Philologist and scholar of ancient Chinese texts.

Sun Zhongshan
Sun Zhongshan 孙中山, See Sun Yat-sen.

Supreme Ultimate
Supreme Ultimate 太極 Tàijí, The “Supreme Ultimate” in Chinese cosmology.

Su Qin
Su Qin 苏秦 (? – ?), strategist, courtesy name Jizi 季子.

Su Shi
Su Shi 苏轼 (1037–1101), Song dynasty poet, essayist, and statesman.

Suzuki Daisetsu
Suzuki Daisetsu 鈴木 大拙 (1870–1966), Japanese scholar of Zen Buddhism.

Suzuki Yoshijiro
Suzuki Yoshijiro 鈴木由次郎 (1901–1976), Japanese scholar.

=== T ===
taiji
taiji 太极 [太極] tàijí, The Supreme Ultimate in Chinese cosmology.

Taiping jing
Taiping jing 太平经 [太平經] Tàipíngjīng (Daoismus), Scripture of Great Peace, Daoist text.

Taixu
Taixu 太虚 (1890–1947), Chinese Buddhist modernist and reformer.

Taizhou School
Taizhou School 泰州学派, School of thought emphasizing individual moral intuition in the Ming-Qing period.

Takahashi Yūji
Takahashi Yūji 高橋勇治 (1909–1992), Japanese scholar of Chinese philosophy.

Takata Shinji
Takata Shinji 高田眞治 (1893–1975), Japanese scholar of Daoism.

Takeuchi Teruo
Takeuchi Teruo 竹内照夫 (1910–1982), Japanese sinologist and scholar of Chinese classics.

Tang Junyi
Tang Junyi 唐君毅 (1909–1978), New Confucian thinker.

Tang Mingbang
Tang Mingbang 唐明邦 (1925–2018), Chinese philosopher and scholar of Confucianism.

Tang Yijie
Tang Yijie 汤一介 (1927–2014), Chinese philosopher and Confucian scholar.

Tang Yongtong
Tang Yongtong 湯用彤 [汤用彤] (1893–1964), Chinese scholar of Buddhist philosophy.

Tang Zhen
Tang Zhen 唐甄 (1630–1704), Ming-Qing philosopher.

Tan Jiefu
Tan Jiefu 谭戒甫 [譚戒甫] (1887–1974), Chinese educator and philosopher.

Tan Qiao
Tan Qiao 谭峭 (ca. 860–ca. 940), Tang dynasty scholar.

Tan Sitong
Tan Sitong 谭嗣同 (1865–1898), Chinese reformist thinker and martyr.

Tan Yunshan
Tan Yunshan 谭云山 [譚雲山] (1898–1983), Chinese Buddhist scholar and educator.

Tao Hongjing
Tao Hongjing 陶弘景, Daoist alchemist and scholar of the Southern and Northern Dynasties.

Ten Wings
Ten Wings 十翼 shíyì, Commentaries on the Yijing (Book of Changes).

Tao Xisheng
Tao Xisheng 陶希圣 (1899–1988), Chinese philosopher and scholar.

thing
thing; matter. See wu 物, object or thing in philosophy.

Thoreau, Henry David
Henry David Thoreau (1817–1862), American philosopher and naturalist.

tian
tian 天 tiān, Heaven; the cosmic or divine principle.

Tianchao tianmu zhidu
Tianchao tianmu zhidu 天朝田畝制度 Tiāncháo tiánmǔ zhìdù, Land system of the Heavenly Dynasty (Taiping document; see Hong Xiuquan, Hong Rengan).

Tian He
Tian He 田何 (? – ?), Scholar-official of the Western Han dynasty.

tianming
Mandate of Heaven, 天命 tiānmìng, see ming.

Tian Pian
Tian Pian 田骈 [田駢] (? – ?), Historical figure.

Tian Qiu
Tian Qiu 田俅 (? – ?), Also Tian Jiu 田鸠, Historical figure.

Tiantai School
Tiantai School 天台宗 Tiāntāizōng, Tiantai / Tendai Buddhist school.

Tian Xiangzi
Tian Xiangzi 田襄子 (? – ?), Philosopher of the Warring States period.

Tikhvinsky, Sergei Leonidovich
Sergei Leonidovich Tikhvinsky (1918–2018), Russian scholar of Chinese thought.

Titarenko, Mikhail Leontyevich
Mikhail Leontyevich Titarenko (1934–2016), Editor of the Russian Encyclopedic Dictionary of Chinese Philosophy.

tiyong
tiyong 体用 [體用] tǐyòng, Concept of substance and function in Chinese philosophy.

Tkachenko, Grigori Alexandrovich
Grigori Alexandrovich Tkachenko (1947–2000), Russian sinologist.

Tolstoy, Leo Nikolayevich
Leo Nikolayevich Tolstoy (1828–1910), Russian writer and philosopher.

Tongcheng School
Tongcheng School 桐城派, Literary school in Qing China emphasizing classical prose.

Torchinov, Evgeny Alexeevich
Evgeny Alexeevich Torchinov (1956–2003), Russian scholar of Daoism.

transformation
transformation; change; alteration. See hua 化 huà, change or transformation in philosophy.

transmission of the tradition
transmission of the tradition. See Daotong 道统 / 道統, transmission of the lineage.

Treasury of Daoist Writings
Treasury of Daoist Writings/Treasury of the Dao. See Daozang 道藏, Daoist canon.

Tsukamoto Zenryu
Tsukamoto Zenryu 塚本善隆 (1898–1980), Japanese scholar of Chinese philosophy.

Tucci, Giuseppe
Giuseppe Tucci (1894–1984), Italian scholar of Buddhism and Tibetology.

Turgot, Anne Robert Jacques
Anne Robert Jacques Turgot (1727–1781), French economist and statesman.

twofold truth
twofold truth 二谛 èrdì, Buddhist concept distinguishing conventional and ultimate truth.

=== U ===
Uno Seiichi
Uno Seiichi 宇野精一 (1910–2008), Japanese scholar of Chinese philosophy and Confucianism.

=== V ===
Vasilyev, Kim Vasilyevich
Kim Vasilyevich Vasilyev (1932–1991), Russian scholar of Chinese philosophy.

Vasilyev, Leonid Sergeyevich
Leonid Sergeyevich Vasilyev (1930–2016), Russian sinologist.

Vasilyev, Vasily Pavlovich
Vasily Pavlovich Vasilyev (1818–1900), Russian sinologist.

view of life
view of life (renshengguan 人生观 / 人生觀 rénshēngguān), concept of worldview or general outlook on life.

Voltaire
Voltaire (1694–1778), French Enlightenment writer, historian, and philosopher.

=== W ===
Waley, Arthur
Arthur Waley (1889–1966), British sinologist and translator of Chinese and Japanese literature.

Wang Anshi
Wang Anshi 王安石 (1021–1086), Chinese economist, statesman, and reformer of the Song dynasty.

Wang Bai
Wang Bai 王柏 (1197–1274), Song dynasty scholar.

Wang Bi
Wang Bi 王弼 (226–249), Chinese philosopher known for his commentaries on the Dao De Jing and I Ching.

Wang Bo
Wang Bo, see Wang Bai

Wang Chuanshan
Wang Chuanshan 王船山 (1619–1692), See Wang Fuzhi, Chinese Neo-Confucian scholar.

wangdao
wangdao 王道 wángdào, the “Way of the King” or proper governance in Confucian thought.

Wang Dianji
Wang Dianji 汪奠基 (1900–1979), Chinese scholar.

Wang Fengxian
Wang Fengxian 王风贤 (1929–2019), modern Chinese philosopher.

Wang Fu
Wang Fu 王符 (? 85–162), Han dynasty philosopher and author of classic essays.

Wang Fuzhi
Wang Fuzhi 王夫之 (1619–1692), influential Neo-Confucian philosopher.

Wang Gen
Wang Gen 王艮 (1483–1541), founder of the Taizhou School.

Wang Guowei
Wang Guowei 王国维 (1877–1927), Chinese scholar, poet, and literary critic.

Wang Hao
Wang Hao 王浩 (1921–1995), Chinese mathematician.

Wang Ji
Wang Ji 王畿 (1498–1583), Ming dynasty philosopher.

Wang Mingsheng
Wang Mingsheng 王鳴盛 (1722–1797), Qing dynasty scholar.

Wang Niansun
Wang Niansun 王念孫 (1744–1832), Chinese philologist.

Wang Ruoshui
Wang Ruoshui 王若水 (1926–2002), Chinese journalist, political theorist, and philosopher.

Wang Shouren
Wang Shouren 王守仁, See Wang Yangming, Neo-Confucian philosopher.

Wang Su
Wang Su 王肃 (195–256), Chinese philosopher and scholar.

Wang Tao
Wang Tao 王韬 (1828–1897), Chinese reformer and writer.

Wang Tingxiang
Wang Tingxiang 王廷相 (1474–1544), Ming dynasty official and scholar.

Wang Tong
Wang Tong 王通 (ca. 584–617), Confucian philosopher.

Wang Xinzhai
Wang Xinzhai 王心斋 (1483–1541), Wang Gen 王艮, Neo-Confucian scholar.

Wang Xuanlan
Wang Xuanlan 王玄览 (626–697), Tang dynasty scholar.

Wang Yangming
Wang Yangming (1472–1529), Wang Shouren 王守仁, leading Neo-Confucian philosopher.

Wang Yinglin
Wang Yinglin 王應麟 (1223–1296), Song dynasty scholar, also known as Wang Bohou 王伯厚.

Wang Yinzhi
Wang Yinzhi 王引之 (1766–1834), Qing dynasty philologist.

Wang Yousan
Wang Yousan 王友三（1929–1997）, modern Chinese scholar.

Wang Zhong
Wang Zhong 汪中 (1745–1794), Qing dynasty scholar.

Wan Sida
Wan Sida 萬斯大 (1633–1683), Chinese scholar of the Qing dynasty.

warp and weft
warp and weft, see jing 经 [經] jīng and wei 纬 [緯] wěi.

Watanabe Takashi
Watanabe Takashi 渡邊卓 (1912–1971), Japanese scholar of Chinese literature.

Watson, Burton
Burton Watson (1925–2017), American translator of Chinese and Japanese classics.

Watts, Alan
Alan Watts (1915–1973), British-American writer and interpreter of Eastern philosophy.

wangdao
kingly way; benevolent government. See wangdao 王道 wángdào, the path of authoritarian rule. see also Way of the Despot. 霸道 bàdào.

Way of Governing
Way of Governing. The ideal path of rulership in Confucian thought. See zhengdao

Way of the Despot
Way of the Despot. 霸道 bàdào

Way of True Unity
Way of True Unity. See zhengdao 正道 zhèngdao, the path of genuine moral governance.

Weber, Max
Max Weber (1864–1920), German sociologist and political economist.

wei
wei 為/爲[为] wèi, action; doing.

wei
wei 为 / 為/爲 wéi, the Later Mohist principle of “benefit” or “doing.”

Wei Boyang
Wei Boyang 魏伯阳/魏伯陽 (100–170), Taoist alchemist and philosopher.

Wei Liaoweng
Wei Liaoweng 魏了翁 (1178–1237), Song dynasty scholar.

Wei Mou
Wei Mou 魏牟 (? 360–280 BCE), Mohist philosopher.

Weishizong
Weishizong 唯识宗, Yogācāra school of Buddhism (Consciousness-Only School).

weishu
weishu 纬书 / 緯書 wěishū, apocryphal texts.

Wei Yuan
Wei Yuan 魏源 (1794–1857), Qing dynasty scholar and reformer.

Welch, Holmes Hinkley
Holmes H. Welch (1924–1981), American scholar of Chinese religion.

well-field system
jingtian 井田 jǐngtián, “well-field system,” ancient Chinese land distribution method.

wen
wen 文, culture, writing, literature, and language.

wenda
wenda (mondo); Questions and Answers 问答 [問答] wèn-dá, a Q&A dialogue form between master and disciple, similar to Kōan.

Wen Gongyi
Wen Gongyi 温公颐/温公頤 (1904–1996), modern Chinese scholar.

Wenzi
Wenzi 文子, Daoist text attributed to Master Wen.

Wieger, Léon
Léon Wieger (1856–1933), Jesuit sinologist and translator.

Wilhelm, Hellmut
Hellmut Wilhelm (1905–1990), German sinologist.

Wilhelm, Richard
Richard Wilhelm (1873–1930), German sinologist and translator.

Wilkins, John
John Wilkins (1614–1672), English philosopher and linguist.

wind and flow
wind and flow. Fengliu 风流 [風流] fēngliú, literary and cultural refinement.

wisdom
wisdom, zhi 智 zhì, Confucian virtue.

Wittfogel, Karl August
Karl August Wittfogel (1896–1988), German-American sinologist and historian.

Vyatkin, Rudolf Vsevolodovich
Rudolf Vsevolodovich Vyatkin (1910–1995), Russian sinologist.

Wright, Arthur
Arthur Wright (1913–1976), American historian and sinologist, ed. Studies in Chinese thought (1953)

writing
writing; culture. 文 wén, refers to writing, literature, or culture.

wu
wu 物 wù, thing; object.

wuchang
Five Cardinal Virtues 五常 wǔcháng. See sangang wuchang, five cardinal virtues in Confucian ethics.

Wu Cheng
Wu Cheng 吴澄 (1243–1313), Yuan dynasty Neo-Confucian scholar.

Wujing
Wujing 五经 [五經] Wǔjīng, The five canonical books of Confucianism.

Wujing (military)
Wujing 武经, Military classic of ancient China.

Wu Qi
Wu Qi 吴起 (?-381), Author of the Wuzi, Chinese military strategist.

wuwei
wuwei 无为[無為] wúwéi, Non-action; effortless action in Daoism; doctrine of non-interference

wuwo
wuwo 无我 [無我] wúwǒ, non-self in Buddhist philosophy.

wuxing
wuxing 五行 wǔxíng, Five Elements or Five Phases in Chinese cosmology.

Wu Yu
Wu Yu 吳虞 (1872–1949), Chinese historian and philosopher.

Wu Yubi
Wu Yubi 吴与弼 (1391–1469), Ming dynasty scholar.

Wu Yue
Wu Yue 吴樾 (1878–1905), Chinese revolutionary.

wuyun
wuyun 五蕴 [五蘊] wǔ-yùn, The five aggregates in Buddhist philosophy.

Wu Zhihui
Wu Zhihui 吴稚晖 (1865–1953), Chinese scholar and political thinker.

=== X ===
xiangshu zhi xue
xiangshu zhi xue 象数之学 [象數之學], study of symbols and numbers in cosmology; see also Shao Yong.

xianxue
xianxue 仙学 xiānxué, Daoist teachings on immortality.

Xiahou Sheng
Xiahou Sheng 夏侯胜 (? - ?), Chinese scholar.

Xiang Xiu
Xiang Xiu 向秀 (? 227–272), Commentator on the Zhuangzi.

Xiaojing
Xiaojing 孝经 [孝經] Xiàojīng, Classic of Filial Piety.

xiaoren
Insignificant Person; Little Man, 小人 xiǎorén, see also junzi, Confucian term.

Xiaoshuo jia
Xiaoshuo jia 小说家 [小說家], school of fiction writers; see jiuliu shijia 九流十家.

xiaoti
xiaoti 孝悌 xiàotì, filial piety and fraternal respect.

Xiao Wanyuan
Xiao Wanyuan 萧万源 (1936–), modern Chinese scholar.

Xici zhuan
Xici zhuan 繫辭傳 Xìcí zhuàn, commentary on the Book of Changes; part of the Ten Wings 十翼.

Xie Guozhen
Xie Guozhen 谢国桢 (1901–), Chinese scholar.

xiejiao
xiejiao 邪教 xiéjiào, heretical teaching.

Xie Liangzuo
Xie Liangzuo 谢良佐 (1050–1103), also Xie Shangcai 谢上蔡, Confucian scholar.

Xie Wuliang
Xie Wuliang 谢无量 (1884–1964), Chinese scholar.

Xie Yingfang
Xie Yingfang 谢应芳 (1296–1392), Confucian scholar.

Xi Kang
Xi Kang 嵇康 Xī Kāng (Jí Kāng), Cao Wei poet, philosopher, and musician.

xin
xin 心 xīn, mind, heart; consciousness.

xin
xin 信 xìn, trust and fidelity.

xin
xin 信, trust / fidelity.

xing
xing 性 xìng, human nature / character.

xing
xing 形 xíng, physical form.

Xing Bing
Xing Bing 邢昺 (932–1010), commentator on the Classic of History.

Xing Bensi
Xing Bensi 邢贲思 (1929 or 1930–), modern scholar, also Xing Fensi.

Xing Shao
Xing Shao 邢卲 (496- ?), Confucian scholar.

xinlixue
New-Principle Learning, 新理学, see Feng Youlan, philosophical school.

xinxing
xinxing 心性 xīnxìng, mind-nature; see xin and xing.

xinxue
xinxue 心学, School of Mind (Neo-Confucianism), represented by Lu Jiuyuan and Wang Yangming.

xinxue
xinxue [2] 新学 [新學] xīnxué, New Learning (Neo-Confucian school).

Xiong Ansheng
Xiong Ansheng 熊安生 (ca. 497–578), scholar of the Southern dynasties.

Xiong Bolong
Xiong Bolong 熊伯龙 (1617–1669), scholar of the Ming-Qing transition.

Xiong Shili
Xiong Shili 熊十力, modern Chinese philosopher and Neo-Confucianist.

xiushen
xiushen 修身 xiūshēn, self-cultivation.

xu
xu 虚 [虛] xū, emptiness or void.

xuan
xuan 玄 xuán, profound or mysterious.

Xuan Wenjun
Xuan Wenjun, Classical scholar from the pre-Qin period.

xuanxue
xuanxue 玄学 [玄學] xuánxué, metaphysical Daoist philosophy.

Xuanzang
Xuanzang 玄奘 (? 600–664), Buddhist monk and translator of Sanskrit texts into Chinese.

Xu Chongqing
Xu Chongqing 许崇清 [許崇清] (1888–1969), modern scholar.

Xue Fucheng
Xue Fucheng 薛福成 (1838–1894), diplomat and scholar.

Xue Jixuan
Xue Jixuan 薛季宣 (1134–1173), scholar of the Southern Song.

Xue Xuan
Xue Xuan 薛萱 (1389–1464), Confucian scholar.

Xu Fuguan
Xu Fuguan 徐复观 / 徐復觀 (1903–1982), modern historian and philosopher.

Xu Gan
Xu Gan 徐幹 (170–218), philosopher of the late Han dynasty.

Xu Heng
Xu Heng 许衡 / 許衡 (1209–1281), Yuan dynasty scholar.

Xun Can
Xun Can 荀粲 (209–238), Confucian scholar.

Xun Kuang
Xun Kuang 荀況, see Xunzi, Confucian philosopher.

Xunzi
Xunzi 荀子, Master Xun, Confucian philosopher.

Xun Yue
Xun Yue 荀悅 (148–209), historian and philosopher.

Xu Qianxue
Xu Qianxue 徐乾学 / 徐乾學 (1631–1694), scholar of the Qing dynasty.

Xu Shen
Xu Shen 許慎/许慎 Xǔ Shèn, Han dynasty lexicographer and philologist.

Xu Xing
Xu Xing 许行 (? – ?), Confucian scholar.

Xu Yan
Xu Yan 徐彦, classical scholar.

Xu Zunming
Xu Zunming 徐遵明 (475–529), zi: Zipan 子判, Confucian scholar.

=== Y ===
Yan Anle
Yan Anle 颜安乐 / 顏安樂 (Yan Gongsun), scholar.

Yan Beiming
Yan Beiming 严北溟 / 嚴北溟 (1907–1990), philosopher.

Yan Fu
Yan Fu 严复 (1853–1921), reformist scholar and translator.

Yang Dongming
Yang Dongming 杨东明 (1548–1624), Neo-Confucian scholar.

Yang He
Yang He 杨何 (? – ?), scholar.

Yang Jian
Yang Jian 杨简 (1141-1225), scholar.

Yang Liuqiao
Yang Liuqiao 杨柳桥 [楊柳橋] (1908–), Chinese scholar.

Yangmingismus
Yangmingismus, Xinxue 心学 [心學] Xīnxué, philosophy of Wang Yangming.

Yangming School
Yangming School 阳明学派, school founded by Wang Yangming, Neo-Confucianism.

Yan Hui
Yan Yuan 颜渊 (521–490 BCE), disciple of Confucius.

Yan Jun
Yan Jun 颜钧 (? – ?), scholar.

Yan Pengzu
Yan Pengzu 嚴彭祖, founder of the Yan school promoting the Gongyang tradition.

Yang Quan
Yang Quan 杨泉 (? – ?), scholar.

Yang Shi
Yang Shi 杨时 (1053–1135), Confucian scholar.

Yang Shixun
Yang Shixun 杨士勋, scholar.

Yangutov, Leonid Yevgrafovich
Leonid Yevgrafovich Yangutov (1950–), modern philosopher.

Yang Wangsun
Yang Wangsun 杨王孙 (? ?) (Former Han dynasty), Chinese scholar.

Yangwu yundong
Yangwu yundong 洋務運動 / 洋务运动, Yángwù yùndòng, Self-Strengthening Movement (modernization and Westernization in late Qing China).

Yang Xianbang
Yang Xianbang 杨宪邦 [杨献珍] (1896–1992), scholar.

Yang Xingshun
Yang Xingshun 杨兴顺 (1904–1989), scholar.

Yang Xiong
Yang Xiong 扬雄, Yang Ziyun, 53 BCE–18 CE, philosopher, writer, and philologist from Shu.

Yan Ying
Yan Ying 晏婴 (? – 500 BCE), statesman of the State of Qi.

Yang Zhu
Yang Zhu 杨朱 (? – ?), philosopher.

Yan Ruoqu
Yan Ruoqu 阎若璩 (1636–1704), scholar and textual critic.

Yanshina, Elektra Mikhailovna
Elektra Mikhailovna Yanshina (1924–), Russian scholar.

Yantie lun
Yantie lun 盐铁论, Discourses on Salt and Iron, historical economic-political debate in Han China.

Yan Yuan Qing
Yan Yuan 颜元 (1635–1704), Qing dynasty scholar.

Yanzi chunqiu
Yanzi chunqiu 晏子春秋, Spring and Autumn Annals of Master Yan.

Yao Jiheng
Yao Jiheng 姚際恒 (1647–1715), scholar.

ye
Karma|ye 业 [業] yè, karma (Buddhist concept).

Ye Shi
Ye Shi 叶适 [葉適] (1150–1223), Neo-Confucian scholar.

yi
yi 义 [義] yì, righteousness; sense of duty.

Yiguandao
Yiguandao 一贯道 Yi Guan Dao, Chinese religious movement.

Yi He
Yi He 醫和, scholar or physician.

Yijing
Yijing See Zhouyi, Classic of Changes.

Yijing
Yijing 义淨/義淨 Yì Jìng (I-Tsing), Buddhist monk and traveler.

Yili
Yili 仪礼 [儀禮] Yílǐ, Book of Etiquette.

Yinfu jing
Yinfu jing 阴符经 [陰符經], Huangdi Yinfu Jing 黄帝阴符经 [黃帝陰符經], Taoist text.

Yin Wen
Yin Wen 尹文, also Yin Wen zi 尹文子 (ca. 360–280 BCE), scholar.

Yin Yang
Yin Yang 阴阳 [陰陽] yīnyáng, duality of cosmic forces.

Yinxi
Yinxi 尹喜, guardian of the Taoist classics.

Yin Yang jia
Yin Yang jia 阴阳家 [陰陽家], Yin-Yang School.

yitai
yitai 以太, ether or cosmological medium.

Yongkang School
Yongkang School 永康学派, philosophical school of Chen Liang.

Yongjia School
Yongjia School 永嘉学派, Neo-Confucianism, Southern Song dynasty.

Yoshikawa Kōjirō
Yoshikawa Kōjirō 吉川 幸次郎 (1904–1980), Japanese sinologist.

you-wu
you-wu 有无 [有無] yǒuwú, being and non-being; philosophical concept.

You Ruo
You Ruo 有若, disciple of Confucius.

You Zuo
You Zuo 遊酢 (1053–1123), Confucian scholar.

yuanqi
yuanqi 元气 [元氣] yuánqì, vital energy; fundamental force or cause.

Yuan Weishi
Yuan Weishi 袁伟时 [袁偉時] (1931–), historian and philosopher.

Yu Yue
Yu Yue 俞樾 (1821–1907), scholar from Zhejiang.

yuzhou
yuzhou 宇宙 yǔzhòu, universe.

=== Z ===
Zaitsev, Vladimir Vasilievich
Vladimir Vasilievich Zaitsev (1953–), Russian sinologist and researcher of Chinese classics.

Zai Wo
Zai Wo 子我 / Zai Yu 宰予 (522–458 BCE), disciple of Confucius.

Zajia
Zajia 杂家 [雜家] Zájiā, eclectic school or syncretists.

Zeng Guofan
Zeng Guofan 曾国藩 (1811–1872), statesman and scholar.

Zengzi
Zengzi 曾子 (505–436 BCE), Master Zeng, Confucian disciple.

Zhang Binglin
Zhang Binglin 章炳麟 (1896–1936), scholar and philologist.

Zhang Boduan
Zhang Boduan 张伯端 (984–1082), Daoist alchemist.

Zhang Dainian
Zhang Dainian 张岱年 (1909–2004), philosopher.

Zhang Dongsun
Zhang Dongsun 张东荪/張東蓀 (1886–1973), philosopher.

Zhang Erqi
Zhang Erqi 张尔岐 / 張爾岐 (1612–1677), scholar.

Zhang Heng
Zhang Heng 张衡 (78–139), astronomer and polymath.

Zhang Huiyan
Zhang Huiyan 张惠言 (1761–1802), scholar.

Zhang Junmai
Zhang Junmai 张君劢 (Carsun Chang) (1887–1968), philosopher.

Zhang Liwen
Zhang Liwen 张立文 (1935–), scholar.

Zhang Shi
Zhang Shi 张栻 (1133–1180), philosopher.

Zhang Taiyan
Zhang Taiyan 章太炎. See Zhang Binglin.

Zhanguoce pai
Zhanguoce pai 战国策派 Zhànguócè pài, School of Strategies from the Warring States.

Zhang Xingcheng
Zhang Xingcheng 张行成 (12th century), scholar.

Zhang Xuecheng
Zhang Xuecheng 章学诚 (1738–1801), historian and philosopher.

Zhang Yu
Zhang Yu 张禹 (? – 5 BCE), scholar.

Zhang Zai
Zhang Zai 张载 (1020–1078), Neo-Confucian philosopher.

Zhang Zhan
Zhang Zhan 张湛, Zhang Chudu, Neo-Daoist.

Zhang Zhidong
Zhang Zhidong 张之洞 (1837–1909), statesman and reformer.

Zhang Zongxiang
Zhang Zongxiang 章宗祥 (1881–1965), scholar.

Zhan He
Zhan He 詹何 (? – ?), scholar.

Zhan Jianfeng
Zhan Jianfeng 詹剑峰 (1902–1982), scholar.

Zhan Ran
Zhan Ran 湛然 = Jingxi Zhan Ran 荊溪湛然 (711–782), Tiantai school.

Zhan Ruoshui
Zhan Ruoshui 湛若水 (1466–1560), philosopher.

Zhao Jibin
Zhao Jibin 趙紀彬 (1905–1982), scholar.

Zhao Kuang
Zhao Kuang 赵匡 / 趙匡, Zhao Boxiong 赵伯循 (8th century), canonologist.

Zhao Qi
Zhao Qi 趙岐 (108–201), Confucian scholar.

zhen
zhen 真, truth; authenticity.

Zhendi
Zhendi 真谛/真諦 Zhēndì, Paramārtha (499–569), Indian Buddhist monk from Ujjain.

Zhen Dexiu
Zhen Dexiu 真德秀 (1178–1235), Xishan xiansheng, Confucian scholar.

Zheng Guanying
Zheng Guanying 郑观应 (1842–1923), reformist thinker.

zhengming
rectifying of names. zhengming 正名 zhèngmíng, Confucian principle of rectifying names.

zhengming
zhengming 正名 zhèngmíng, rectification of names.

Zheng Xianzhi
Zheng Xianzhi 郑鲜之 (364–427), also Zheng Daozi, scholar.

Zheng Xing
Zheng Xing 郑兴 (? - ?), scholar.

Zheng Xuan
Zheng Xuan 郑学 (127–200), also Zheng Kangcheng, Confucian scholar.

Zhengyi [dao]
Zhengyi [dao] 正一道 Zhèngyī dào, Way of Orthodox Unity.

Zheng Zhong
Zheng Zhong 郑众 (? – 83), also Zheng Zhongshi, scholar.

Zhenkong jiao
Zhenkong jiao 真空教, Teaching of True Emptiness, major Chinese sectarian movement.

zhenru
zhenru 真如 zhēnrú, absolute Reality; Suchness; the (Buddhist) Absolute; see also Bhūtatathatā.

Zhenyan zong
Mantra School, school of Esoteric Buddhism.

zhi
zhi 智 zhì, knowledge; wisdom.

Zhichen
Zhichen 支谶/支讖, Lokakṣema; Zhilou Jiachen 支婁迦讖 (2nd cent.), Buddhist monk and translator.

Zhidun
Zhidun 支遁 (?314–366), Buddhist monk.

Zhi Qian
Zhi Qian 支谦, Buddhist translator.

zhi-xing
zhi-xing 知行 zhī-xíng, Knowing and doing; concept of applying knowledge through practice.

Zhiyi
Zhiyi 智顗 (538–597), founder of Tiantai school.

Zhongchang Tong
Zhongchang Tong 仲长统 (180–220), scholar.

zhong-shu
zhong-shu 忠恕 zhōng-shù, loyalty and consideration / conscientiousness and altruism.

Zhongyong
Zhongyong 中庸 Zhōngyōng, Doctrine of the Mean.

Zhou Canon
Zhou Canon of Changes. See Zhouyi.

Zhou Changes
Zhou Changes. See Zhouyi.

Zhou Dunyi
Zhou Dunyi 周敦颐 (1017–1073), philosopher.

Zhou Fucheng
Zhou Fucheng 周辅成 (1911–2009), scholar.

Zhou Gong
Zhou Gong 周公 Zhōu Gōng, Duke of Zhou.

Zhouguan
Zhouguan 周官 Zhōuguān, see Zhouli.

Zhouli
Zhouli, Zhou Rituals.

Zhou Rituals
Zhou Rituals. See Zhouli.

Zhou Shujia
Zhou Shujia 周叔迦 (1899–1970), scholar.

Zhou Wenying
Zhou Wenying 周文英 (1928–2001), scholar.

Zhou Xiangguang
Zhou Xiangguang 周祥光 (Chou Hsiangkuang) (1919–1963), scholar.

Zhouyi
Zhouyi, Yijing, Book of Changes.

Zhuangzi
Zhuangzi 庄子, Daoist philosophical work named after Zhuang Zhou.

Zhuang Cunyu
Zhuang Cunyu 庄存与 (1719–1788), zi: Fanggeng 方耕, founder of Changzhou School.

Zhuang Zhou
Zhuang Zhou 庄周 Zhuāng Zhōu (ca. 369–286 BCE), Daoist philosopher.

Zhu Bokun
Zhu Bokun 朱伯崑 (1923–2007), scholar.

Zhu Guangqian
Zhu Guangqian 朱光潛 (1897–1986), scholar and aesthetician.

Zhu Qianzhi
Zhu Qianzhi 朱谦之 (1899–1972), scholar.

Zhu Xi
Zhu Xi 朱熹 Zhū Xī (1130–1200), leading Neo-Confucian philosopher, also known as Master Zhu 朱子.

Zhuxianism
Zhuxianism 朱熹主义/朱熹主義 Zhū Xī zhǔyì, philosophical and ideological teachings based on Zhu Xi.

Zhu Zhixin
Zhu Zhixin 朱执信 (1885–1920), also Zhu Dafu.

Zhu Zhiyu
Zhu Zhiyu 朱之瑜 (1600–1682), scholar.

Zichan
Zichan 子产 (? 580–522 BCE), statesman of the State of Zheng.

Zihuazi
Zihuazi 子华子, Master Zihua.

ziran
ziran 自然 zìrán, natural spontaneity in Daoist thought.

Zizhang
Zizhang 子张 (503–? BCE), disciple of Confucius.

Zong Baihua
Zong Baihua 宗白华 (1897–1986), philosopher and aesthetician.

zonghengjia
zonghengjia 纵横家/縱橫家 zònghéngjiā, School of the Vertical and the Horizontal; School of Diplomacy; political strategists (in the Zhanguo period, 475-221 BCE).

Zongmi
Zongmi 宗密 (780–841), Buddhist monk and philosopher.

Zou Rong
Zou Rong 邹容 (1885–1905), revolutionary thinker.

Zou Shouyi
Zou Shouyi 鄒守益 (1491–1562), scholar.

Zou Yan
Zou Yan 驺衍 (? 305–240), philosopher of the Yin-Yang School.

Zuo Shunsheng
Zuo Shunsheng 左舜生 (1893–1969), scholar.

Zuo Xiong
Zuo Xiong 左雄 (? – 138), scholar.

Zuozhuan
Zuozhuan 左传, Commentary of Zuo, historical chronicle.

Erik Zürcher
Erik Zürcher (1928–2008), Dutch sinologist.

== See also ==
- Zhuzi jicheng
- Baizi quanshu

== Bibliography ==
- Kitayskaya filosofiya. Entsiklopedicheskiy slovar' / Китайская философия. Энциклопедический словарь. Mikhail Leontyevich Titarenko et al. (eds.). Moscow 1994, ISBN 5-244-00757-2
- Zhongguo zhexue da cidian 中国哲学大辞典. Zhang Dainian 张岱年 (ed.). Shanghai: Shanghai cishu chubanshe 上海辞书出版社 2010.
- Han-Ying Zhongguo zhexue cidian 汉英中国哲学辞典. Kaifeng 2002
- Feng Youlan: A History of Chinese Philosophy. Translated by Derk Bodde. With introduction, notes, bibliography and index. Princeton, Princeton University Press 1952 und 1953
  - Vol. I: The Period of the Philosophers (From the Beginnings to Circa 100 B.C.)
  - Vol. II: The Period of Classical Learning (From the Second Century B.C. to the Twentieth Century A.D.)
