= Timeline of Eastern philosophers =

Timeline of Eastern | Western philosophers

This is a wide-ranging chronological list of philosophers from the Eastern traditions of philosophy, with special interest in Indo-Chinese philosophy. The list stops at the year 1950, after which philosophers fall into the category of contemporary philosophy.

== Chinese philosophers ==
=== Ancient Chinese philosophers ===
==== Before 256 BCE (until the end of the Zhou dynasty) ====
- Guan Zhong (died in 645 BCE)
- Confucius (traditionally 551–479 BCE) — founder of Confucianism
- Sun Tzu (c. 544–c. 496 BCE) — military philosopher
- Laozi (probably 6th century BCE) — founder of Taoism

===== 475–221 BCE (Warring States period) =====
- Mozi (c. 470–c. 390 BCE) — political and religious philosopher
- Liezi (c. 440–c. 360 BCE)
- Gaozi (c. 420 BCE)
- Mencius (most accepted dates: 372–289 BCE; other possible dates: 385–303 BCE or 302 BCE) — political philosopher, social contract
- Xu Xing (c. 315 BCE)
- Gongsun Longzi (fl. 300 BCE) — School of Names
- Hui Shi (4th century BCE)—School of Names
- Shang Yang (died 338 BCE) — Legalist bureaucrat
- Shen Buhai (died 337 BCE) — Legalist bureaucrat
- Shen Dao (c. 350–275 BCE)
- Song Xing (360–290 BCE)
- Guiguzi (around 4th century)
- Yang Zhu (370–319 BCE)— Usually classified as a Hedonist
- Zhuang Zhou (Zhuangzi, c. 4th century BCE) — major Taoist philosopher
- Xunzi (c. 310–237 BCE) — Confucianist, pessimistic about human nature
- Zou Yan (305?–240? BCE)— School of Naturalists, Yin-Yang, Five Elements
- Han Feizi (died 233 BCE) — totalistic legalism
- Lü Buwei (290–235 BCE)

==== 221 BCE–220 CE (Qin, Han and Xin dynasties) ====
- Jia Yi (201–169 BCE)
- Dong Zhongshu (c. 176–c. 104 BCE)
- Liu An (179–122 BCE)
- Wang Chong (27–97 CE)
- Yang Xiong (53 BCE–18 CE)
- Zheng Xuan (127–200 CE)
- He Yan (190–249 CE)

==== 220 CE–907 CE (Three Kingdoms period to Tang dynasty) ====
- Ruan Ji (210–263)
- Ji Kang (223–262)
- Wang Bi (226–249) — commentator on the Tao Te Ching and the I Ching
- Pei Wei (267–300)
- Xiang Xiu (3rd century)
- Guo Xiang (died 312)
- Zhi Dun (314–366)
- Lushan Huiyuan (334–416)
- Sengzhao (384–414)
- Ge Hong (4th century)
- Tan-luan (476–542)
- Dazu Huike (487–593)
- Nanyue Huisi (515-577)
- Zhiyi (538–597)
- Jizang (549–623)
- Dushun (557–640)
- Dayi Daoxin (580–651)
- Hong Ren (601–674)
- Xuanzang (602–664)
- Yuquan Shenxiu (606–706)
- Shandao (613–681)
- Wunengzi (618-907)
- Cheng Xuanying (631–655)
- Huineng (638–713)
- Fazang (643–712)
- Shenhui (684–758)
- Shitou Xiqian (700–790)
- Mazu Daoyi (709–788)
- Baizhang Huaihai (720–814)
- Li Ao (722–841)
- Qingliang Chengguan (738–839)
- Han Yu (768–824)
- Zhaozhou Congshen (778–897)
- Zongmi (780–841)
- Huangbo Xiyun (?–850)
- Linji Yixuan (died 866)
- Yunmen Wenyan (864 – 949)

==== 907–1368 (Five Dynasties and Ten Kingdoms period to Yuan dynasty) ====
- Xuedou Chongxian (980–1052)
- Fan Zhongyan (989–1052)
- Hu Yuan (993–1059) — revived Confucianism
- Shao Yung (1011–1077)
- Zhou Dunyi (1017–1073)
- Chang Tsai (1020–1077)
- Guo Xi (1020- c. 1090)
- Cheng Hao (1032–1085) — established the Confucian "School of Mind"
- Cheng Yi (1033–1107)
- Yuanwu Keqin (1063–1135)
- Dahui Zonggao (1089–1163)
- Hu Hong (1105-1161)
- Zhu Xi (1130–1200) — thinker of the Confucianist "School of Principle"
- Lu Jiuyuan (1139–1193)
- Wumen Huikai (1183–1260)

==== 1368–1912 (Ming and Qing dynasties) ====
- Chen Xianzhang (1428–1500)
- Wang Yangming (1472–1529)
- Wang Gen (1483-1541)
- He Xinyin (1517-1579)
- Li Zhi (1527–1602)
- Jiao Hong (1540–1620)
- Liu Zongzhou (1578–1645)
- Huang Zongxi (1610–1695)
- Wang Fuzhi (1619–1692)
- Yen Yuan (1635–1704)
- Li Gong (1659–1733)
- Dai Zhen (1724–1777)
- Zhang Xuecheng (1738–1801)
- Yu Zhengxie (1775–1840) — prominent scholar and male feminist, philosopher, philologist, astrologer
- Kang Youwei (1858–1927)
- Tan Sitong (1864–1898)
- Sun Yat-sen (1866–1925)
- Liang Qichao (1873–1929)
- He Zhen (1884–1920)

=== Modern Chinese philosophers ===
==== 1912–1950 ====
- Ch'ien Mu (1895–1990)
- Thomé H. Fang (1899–1976)
- Feng Youlan (1895–1990)
- Xiong Shili (1885–1968)
- Xu Fuguan (1903–1982)
- Hu Shih (1891–1962)
- Liang Shuming (1893–1988)
- Zhang Dongsun (1886–1973)
- Liu Shaoqi (1898–1969)
- Mao Zedong (1893–1976)
- Mou Tsung-san (1909–1995)
- T'ang Chun-i (1909–1978)
- Hao Wang (1921–1995)

== Indian philosophers ==
=== Ancient Indian philosophers ===
==== Early Vedic age 1500-800 BCE (Saptarishi) ====
- Vasishtha
- Atri
- Vishvamitra
- Agastya
- Gautama Maharishi
- Jamadagni
- Bharadwaja
- Dirghatamas, famous for his monistic views
- Lopamudra, the earliest female philosopher

==== Late Vedic age 800–400 BCE (Sectarianism) ====
- Parshvanatha (between 872 and 772 BCE) is the earliest Jain tirthankara who is generally acknowledged as a historical figure.
- Aruni (between 750 and 650 BCE) credited with laying the foundation of Indian atomism
- Yajnavalkya (between 700 and 600 BCE) credited for coining Advaita (non-dual, monism), an important tradition within Hinduism
- Makkhali Gosala (between 600 and 500 BCE) – founder Ājīvika philosophy
- Pāṇini (between 600 and 500 BCE) – made contributions to Philosophy of language and Sanskrit grammar
- Siddhartha Gautama (c. 563–483 BCE) – founder of Buddhism
- Mahākāśyapa – Most Venerable Mahā Kāshyapa Maha Thero
- Bṛhaspati – Founder of Cārvāka philosophy
- Mahavira (599–527 BCE) – heavily influenced Jainism, the 24th Tirthankara of Jainism
- Badarayana (lived between 500 BCE and 400 BCE) – Author of Brahma Sutras
- Kapila (c. 500 BCE) founder of Sankhya philosophy

==== 321–184 BCE (Maurya Empire) ====
- Shvetashvatara – Author of earliest textual exposition of a systematic philosophy of Shaivism
- Chanakya (c. 350–275 BCE) – A pioneer in the field of economics and political science
- Jaimini (c. 300–200 BCE) – Author of Purva Mimamsa Sutras
- Aksapada Gautama (c. 2nd century BCE) – founder of Nyaya philosophy
- Kanada – founder of Vaisheshika
- Pingala – Renowned for his work on Combinatorics and Sanskrit prosody

==== 184 BCE–100 CE (Early Middle Kingdoms Begin—The Golden Age) ====
- Patanjali – Author of Yoga Sutra and a commentary on Panini
- Thiruvalluvar (c. 1st century BCE–2nd century CE), best known for authoring the Tirukkuṛaḷ, a collection of couplets on ethics

==== 100–300 (Cholas, Cheras, Pandavas and Kushan Empire) ====
- Nagarjuna (c. 150–250) – founder of Madhyamaka Buddhism
- Kundakunda (c. 2nd century), exponent of Jain mysticism and Jain nayas
- Umāsvāti or Umasvami (c. 2nd century), author of first Jain work in Sanskrit Tattvārthasūtra

==== 300–550 (Gupta Empire) ====
- Vasubandhu (c. 4th century) – one of the main founders of the Yogacara school
- Asanga (c. 4th century) – one of the main founders of the Yogacara school
- Bodhidharma (c. 440–528) – founder of Zen Buddhism
- Vatsyayana (c. 450–500) – author of commentary on Nyāya Sūtras and Kama Sutra
- Bhartrhari (450–510) – contributed to linguistic theory
- Buddhaghosa (c. 5th century)
- Siddhasena Divākara (c. 5th century) – Jain logician and author of important works in Sanskrit and Prakrit
- Dignāga (c. 5th century) – one of the Buddhist founders of Indian logic
- Bhāviveka (c. 6th century) – founder of the Svātantrika tradition of Mādhyamaka
- Śīlabhadra (c. 529–645) He is best known as being an abbot of Nālandā monastery in India, as being an expert on Yogācāra teachings, and for being the personal tutor of the Chinese Buddhist monk Xuanzang.
- Udyotakara Udyotakara(c. 6th–7th century) – Nyaya Philosopher

==== 600–900 (Late Middle Kingdoms—The Classical Age) ====
- Candrakirti (born c. 600) – Madhyamaka Buddhist
- Kumārila Bhaṭṭa (c. 7th century) – Mimansa Philosopher
- Udyanacharya (c. 7th century) – Nyaya Philosopher
- Prabhākara (c. 7th century) – Grammarian and Mimansa Philosopher
- Dharmakirti (c. 7th century)
- Gaudapadacharya (c. 7th century) – Advaita Philosopher
- Śāntideva (c. 7th-8th century) – Mahāyāna Buddhist
- Adi Shankara (c. 788–820) – Advaita Vedanta school
- Anandavardhana (c. 820–890) – Philosopher of Aesthetics
- Vasugupta (860–925) – Author of Shiva Sutras
- Vācaspati Miśra (c. 9th century) – Nyaya Philosopher
- Jayanta Bhatta (c. 9th century) – Nyaya Philosopher

==== 900–1100 (The Islamic Sultanates) ====
- Abhinavagupta (c. 975–1025)
- Atiśa (c. 980–1054) He was one of the major figures in the spread of Mahayana and Vajrayana Buddhism in Asia and inspired Buddhist thought from Tibet to Sumatra
- Udayana (c. 10th century) he was a very important Hindu logician who attempted to reconcile the views held by the two major schools of logic (Nyaya and Vaisheshika).
- Ramanuja (c. 1017–1137) – founder of Vishishtadvaita or Qualified Non-dualism

==== 1100–1500 (Vijaynagara Empire and Delhi Sultanate) ====
- Gorakshanath (11th- to 12th-centuries)
- Basaveshwara (1134–1196) – founder of Lingayatism
- Shri Madhvacharya (1238–1317)
- Gangeśa Upādhyāya (c. 13th century)
- Nimbarka (c. 13th century)
- Mādhava Vidyāranya (c. 1268–1386)
- Kabir (1440–1518)
- Vyasatirtha (c. 1460–1539)
- Raghunatha Siromani (c. 1477–1547) — founder of Navya Nyāya philosophy
- Vallabhacharya (c. 1479–1531)
- Chaitanya Mahaprabhu (c. 1486–1534)
- Ravidas (1450–1520)

==== 1500–1800 (Mughal Empire, Rajput Kingdoms and Marahtha Confederacy Era) ====
- Mirabai (1498–1557) Bhakti saint & devotee of Krishna
- Nanak (c. 1469–1539) – Bhakti Philosopher, Founder of Sikhism
- Bhai Gurdas, foundation Sikh philosophy, Indian six school interpretation
- Madhusūdana Sarasvatī (c. 1540–1640)
- Vijñānabhikṣu (c. 1550–1600) – synthesized Vedānta, Sāṃkhya, and Yoga into avibhagādvaita ("indistinguishable non-dualism")
- Gadadhara Bhattacharya (17th century) – Nyaya philosopher

=== Modern Indian philosophers ===
==== 1800–1947 (Colonial and Postcolonial Era) ====
- Debendranath Tagore (1817–1905)
- Dayananda Saraswati (1824–1883) founder of arya samaj
- Sai Baba (1835–1918)
- Ramakrishna Paramahamsa (1836–1886)
- Swami Vivekananda (1863–1902)
- Krishna Chandra Bhattacharya (1875–1949) Phenomenology
- Narayana Guru (1856–1928)
- Rabindranath Tagore (1861–1941)
- Brajendra Nath Seal (1864–1938)
- Mahatma Gandhi (1869–1948)
- Sri Aurobindo (1872–1950)
- Muhammad Iqbal (1877–1938)
- Ramana Maharshi (1879–1950)
- Nigamananda (1880–1935)
- Gopinath Kaviraj (1887–1976)
- Sarvepalli Radhakrishnan (1888–1975)
- Nolini Kanta Gupta (1889–1983)
- Bhimrao Ramji Ambedkar (1891–1956)
- Jiddu Krishnamurti (1895–1986)
- A. C. Bhaktivedanta (1896–1977) — founder/acharya of ISKCON (Hare Krishna movement)
- Nisargadatta Maharaj (1897–1981)
- Haridas Chaudhuri (1913–1975)
- Deendayal Upadhyaya (1916–1968)
- U. G. Krishnamurti (1918–2007)
- Ram Swarup (1920–1998)
- Prabhat Ranjan Sarkar (1921–1990)
- Sita Ram Goel (1921–2003)
- Swami Krishnananda (1922–2001)
- Jitendra Nath Mohanty(1928-)
- Osho (1931–1990)
- Amartya Sen (born 1933)
- Bimal Krishna Matilal (1935–1991)
- Pandurang Shastri Athavale (1920–2003)

== Japanese philosophers ==
=== Ancient Japanese philosophers ===
==== Until 1185 CE (until the end of the Heian period) ====
- Kūkai (774–835)
- Hōnen (1133–1212)

==== 1185–1333 (Kamakura period) ====
- Shinran (1173–1261)
- Dōgen Zenji (1200–1253)
- Nichiren (1222–1282)

==== 1333–1867 (Muromachi period to Edo period) ====
- Zeami Motokiyo (c. 1363–c. 1443)
- Fujiwara Seika (1561–1619)
- Miyamoto Musashi (1584–1645)
- Kumazawa Banzan (1619–1691)
- Itō Jinsai (1627–1705)
- Kaibara Ekken (1630–1714)
- Ogyū Sorai (1666–1728)
- Hakuin Ekaku (1686–1769)
- Tominaga Nakamoto (1715–1746)
- Motoori Norinaga (1730–1801)
- Nishi Amane (1829–1897)

=== Modern Japanese philosophers ===
==== 1867–1950 ====
- Nishida Kitaro (1870–1945)
- D. T. Suzuki (1870–1966)
- Tanabe Hajime (1885–1962)
- Kuki Shūzō (1888–1941)
- Watsuji Tetsuro (1889–1960)
- Sakurazawa Yukikazu (George Ohsawa) (1893–1966)
- Miki Kiyoshi (1897–1945)
- Josei Toda (1900–1958)
- Nishitani Keiji (1900–1990)

== Korean philosophers ==
=== Ancient Korean philosophers ===
==== Until 676 CE (until the end of the Three Kingdoms period) ====
- Seungrang (c. 6th century)

==== 676–935 (Unified Silla period) ====
- Woncheuk (613–696)
- Wonhyo (617–686)
- Uisang (625–702)
- Doseon (827–898)
- Ch'oe Ch'i-wŏn (born 857)

==== 935–1392 (Goryeo period) ====
- Uicheon (1055–1101)
- Jinul (1158–1210)

==== 1392–1910 (Joseon period) ====
- Chŏng Tojŏn (1342–1398)
- Sŏ Kyŏngdŏk (1489–1546)
- Yi Ŏnjŏk (1491–1553)
- Cho Sik (1501–1572)
- Yi Hwang (1501–1570)
- Yi I (1536–1584)
- Jeong Je-du (1649–1736)
- Yi Gan (1677–1727)
- Namdang (1682–1750)
- Chŏng Yagyong (1762–1836)
- Kim Chŏnghŭi (1786–1856)
- Choi Han-gi (1803–1879)
- Choi Je-u (1824–1864)
- Yi Je-ma (1838–1900)

=== Modern Korean philosophers ===
==== 1910–1950 ====
- Ryu Yeong-mo (1890–1981)
- Ham Seok-heon (1901–1989)

== Tibetan philosophers ==
- Sakya Pandita (1182–1251)
- Rangjung Dorje (1284-1339)
- Dolpopa (Dol-bo-ba, 1292–1361)
- Longchenpa (1308–1364)
- Je Tsongkhapa (1357–1419)
- Gorampa (1429–1489)
- Sakya Chokden 1428–1507)
- Gyeltsap Darma Rinchen (1364–1432)
- Mikyö Dorje (1507–1554)
- Wangchuk Dorje (1556–1603)
- Jamyang Khyentse Wangpo (1820–1892)
- Jamgön Kongtrül (1813-1899)
- Jamgön Ju Mipham (1846–1912)

== See also ==
- List of years in philosophy
