= Shendu =

Shendu may refer to:

- Shéndū (神都), the name for Luoyang during the Wu Zhou dynasty (690-705)
- Shēndú (身毒), an archaic Chinese name for India
- Shendu, a character from Jackie Chan Adventures series
