= Chen Huan =

- Chen Huan, in the Qingdai xuezhe xiangzhuan 清代学者象传
- Born: 1786
- Died: 1863 (aged 76–77)
- Occupation: Chinese scholar of the Qing dynasty

Chen Huan (simplified Chinese: 陈奂; traditional Chinese: 陳奐; Wade–Giles: Ch’en Huan; born 1786; died 1863), zi: Zhuoyun 倬雲, hao: Shuofu 碩甫, was a Chinese philologist of the Qing dynasty. He was the author of a sub-commentary on the Book of Songs in Mao's version (Maoshi 毛诗).

The Chinese mathematician Li Shanlan (1811–1882) was his student.

== Works (selection) ==
- Shi Maoshi zhuanshu 诗毛氏传疏 (in Huang Qing jingjie xubian 皇清经解续编)

== See also ==
- Li Shanlan

== Bibliography ==
- Hummel, Arthur W. Sr., ed. (1943). "Wang Hsien" . Eminent Chinese of the Ch'ing Period. United States Government Printing Office.
