= Evgeny Torchinov =

Russian sinologist (1956–2003)

Evgeny Alexeevich Torchinov
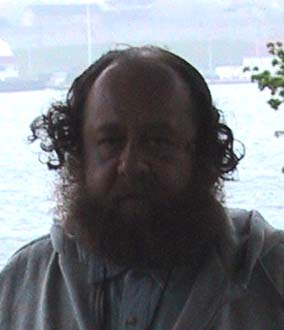
- Evgeny Torchinov (2002)
- Born: August 22, 1956; Ordzhonikidze, Russian SFSR, Soviet Union
- Died: July 12, 2003 (aged 46); St. Petersburg, Russian Federation
- Citizenship: USSR, Russia
- Education: Saint Petersburg State University
- Occupations: Sinologist, buddhist scholar, professor, translator
- Website: torchinov.com (in Russian)

Evgeny Alexeevich Torchinov (Russian: Евгений Алексеевич Торчинов; 22 August 1956 – 12 July 2003) was a Russian sinologist, Buddhist scholar, professor, and translator. He was best known as an eminent Russian researcher of ancient Chinese religion and philosophy, author of many books and translations of classical Chinese texts (especially Buddhist and Taoist) into Russian. He founded the chair of Eastern philosophy and cultures at St. Petersburg State University.

== Life and career ==
Evgeny Torchinov was born 22 August 1956, in the city of Ordzhonikidze, and soon his family moved to Saratov. After graduation from high-school in 1973, Torchinov was admitted to the Faculty of Oriental Studies of Leningrad (now Saint Petersburg) State University, where he majored in Chinese philology. After graduation in 1978, he became a PhD candidate at the State Museum of History of Religion and Atheism, where he worked as a research fellow from 1981 to 1984. From 1984 and until 1994, he worked as researcher at the St.Petersburg branch of the Institute of Oriental Studies of the Academy of Sciences.

In 1994, he defended his second doctoral dissertation entitled "Taoism: An attempt of historical-religious description". In 1998, he became the Chair of Philosophy of Religion and Religious Studies at St. Petersburg State University, and in 1999 created and led as the chair of Oriental Philosophy and Cultures.

Torchinov began to consider himself a Buddhist in 1975. He was the official representative in Russia and a member of the Board of directors of, consultant and laic Buddhist lecturer for Buddha's Light International Association, and president of St. Petersburg Buddhist association Fo Guang (Buddha's Light). Torchinov called himself off-sect Buddhist.

He also worked as a visiting professor at the University of Saskatchewan in Saskatoon, Saskatchewan, Canada.

Torchinov died on July 12, 2003, in Saint Petersburg.

== Academic activity ==
Torchinov made contributions to Taoism studies and translation of classical Taoist treatises. In his doctoral thesis he provided a detailed review of Taoism, its history, schools and concepts, relying on Chinese sources and global sinology. Later, he had the Taoist review published as a monograph aimed for non-specialist audience.

Many of Torchinov's publications give an insight into the practical aspects of Taoism such as Outer Alchemy, Inner Alchemy, meditation techniques, afterlife techniques, and esoteric sex practices.

Torchinov's long studies of Buddhism resulted in publication of an academic manual, Introduction to Buddhology.

His academic interest in this field was focused on Mahajana and Far East Buddhism. He translated several authoritative Buddhist works from Chinese and Old Chinese into Russian, including The Treatise on evocation of trust in Mahajana.

Torchinov translated a number of Ch'an Buddhism treatises, classical and modern.

Generalizing his religious studies, Torchinov released a book entitled Religions of the world: Experience of the Transcendence dealing with transcendental states of consciousness and psychic techniques. The book provides in-depth analyses of Shamanism, ancient religions, sects, and modern world religions.

Torchinov wrote several works in comparative religious studies. Some of his works are also dedicated to Kabbalah.

== Selected bibliography ==
=== Monographs and books ===
- Религии мира. Опыт запредельного (трансперсональные состояния и психотехника). СПб.: Центр «Петербургское востоковедение», 1997.
- Пути философии Востока и Запада: Познание запредельного. СПб: «Азбука-классика», «Петербургское востоковедение», 2005. — 480 с.
- Даосизм. Опыт историко-религиоведческого описания. СПб.: Андреев и сыновья, 1993 (2-е дополненное издание: СПб.: Лань, 1998).
- Введение в буддологию. Курс лекций. СПб., Петербургское философское общество, 2000. — 304 с.
- Бой тигра с драконом или секреты китайской кухни
- Буддизм в Китае // Буддизм. Каноны. История. Искусство. М., Дизайн. Информация. Картография, 2006 г. ISBN 5-287-00373-0, ISBN 5-287-00033-2.

=== Translations ===
- Чжан Бо-дуань. Главы о прозрении истины (У чжэнь пянь). Предисловие, перевод, комментарии. СПб.: Центр «Петербургское востоковедение», 1994.
- Трактат о пробуждении веры в Махаяну (Махаяна шраддхотпада шастра). СПб.: Издательство Буковского, 1997.
- Пятый Чаньский Патриарх Хун-жэнь. Трактат об основах совершенствования сознания (Сю синь яо лунь). СПб.: Дацан Гунзэчойнэй, 1994.
- Гэ Хун. Баопу-цзы. Эзотерическая часть. Перев., предисл., коммент. СПб.: Центр «Петербургское востоковедение», 1999.

=== Articles ===
- Беззаботное скитание в мире сокровенного и таинственного: Мартин Хайдеггер и даосизм // Религия и традиционная культура. Сборник научных трудов. СПб., 2000, с.74–90.
- Этика и ритуал в религиозном даосизме // Этика и ритуал в традиционном Китае: М.: Наука, 1988, с. 202—235.
- Трактат Гэ Хуна и «искусство внутренних покоев» // Петербургское Востоковедение. Вып. 4. СПб., 1993.
- Доктрина происхождения зла в лурианской и саббатианской Каббале и в буддийском «Трактате о Пробуждении веры в Махаяну»// Kabbalah: Journal for the Study of Jewish Mystical Texts. Ed. by D. Abrahams and A. Elqayam. Vol. 5, 2000, p. 183—198.
- Даосско-буддийское взаимодействие (теоретико-методологические проблемы исследования) // Народы Азии и Африки, 1988, № 2, с. 45–54.
- Даосизм и китайская культура: проблема взаимодействия // Народы Азии и Африки, 1982, № 2, с. 155—168.
