= Changzhi Li =

Chinese-American electrical engineer

- Born: Chengdu, China
- Citizenship: United States
- Education: Zhejiang University, China
- Known for: Expertise microwave technologies applications in healthcare, security, and human-machine interface,
- Awards: National Academy of Inventors and IEEE Fellow, Distinguished Microwave Lecturer IEEE,
- Scientific career
- Fields: Electrical Engineering
- Workplaces: Department of Electrical and Computer Engineering, Texas Tech University

Changzhi Li is a full professor and Whitacre Endowed Chair in Electrical & Computer Engineering, at Texas Tech University.

Li specializes in portable radar sensor technologies that significantly advance healthcare, smart living, structural monitoring, and wireless human-machine interfaces. His research focuses on RF/analog circuits and microwave/millimeter-wave sensing for healthcare, security, and human-machine interface.

His contributions have led to his elevation as a Fellow of the National Academy of Inventors (NAI) and he was named as an IEEE Microwave Theory and Techniques Society (MTT-S) Distinguished Microwave Lecturer (DML), Tatsuo Itoh class of 2022–2024. In 2024 he was elevated to IEEE Fellow Li is also an IEEE MTT TC-28 Member (TC-28 Biological Effects and Medical Applications Committee)

== Early life and education ==
Li received a B.S. degree in electrical engineering from Zhejiang University, China, in 2004.
He pursued his MSc and PhD in 2007 at University of Florida. His PhD research focused on Doppler Phase Modulation Effect for non-contact accurate measurement of vital signs and other periodic movements, culminating in the integration of theory into CMOS system-on-chip technology.
Li became an assistant professor in the Department of Electrical and computer engineer at Texas University in 2009, later in 2014 became associate professor and from 2020 is full professor in the same university.

== Academic career ==
Currently, Li holds the position of full professor and Whitacre Endowed Chair in Electrical and Computer Engineering at Texas Tech University.

Li currently serves as Editor-in-Chief of the IEEE Transactions on Microwave Theory and Techniques, and he was an associate/guest editor for various academic journals and publications, and guest chair of conferences, workshops and technical committees.

== Awards and honors ==
- 2024: IET A F Harvey Engineering Research Prize
- 2018: IEEE MTT-S Outstanding Young Engineer Award,
- 2016: the IEEE Sensors Council Early Career Technical Achievement Award,
- 2015: the NSF Faculty Early CAREER Award.
- 2014: the ASEE Frederick Emmons Terman Award,
- 2014: the IEEE-HKN Outstanding Young Professional Award,

== Books and publications ==
Li is the co-author of the following books:

- 2017: Radar for Indoor Monitoring Detection, Classification, and Assessment, Changzhi Li, Jenshan Lin, Wiley
- 2013: (book chapter) Microwave Noncontact Motion Sensing and Analysis, Edited By Moeness G. Amin, CRC Press

Li has an h-index of 62, more than 15000 citations, and more than 200 articles in journals (2025)
