= He Xinyin =

Chinese philosopher (1517–1579)

- 何心隱
- Born: 1517; Yongfeng, Jiangxi
- Died: 1579 (aged 61–62)
- Education: juren degree (1546)

Philosophical work
- School: Taizhou School
- Notable works: Yuanxue yuanjiang

He Xinyin
- Traditional Chinese: 何心隱
- Simplified Chinese: 何心隐
Transcriptions
Standard Mandarin
- Hanyu Pinyin: Hé Xīnyǐn

He Xinyin (Note: He Xinyin's birth name was Liang Ruyuan (梁汝元), and his courtesy name was Fushan (夫山). He Xinyin was a pseudonym he adopted later.) (1517–1579) was a Chinese Neo-Confucian philosopher who lived and worked during the Ming dynasty.

== Biography ==
He Xinyin's family originated from Yongfeng County in Jiangxi Province, located in southern China. He was well-versed in Confucian classics and successfully passed the civil service examinations. In 1546, he achieved first place in the provincial examinations and was granted the rank of juren. He was introduced to the philosophy of Wang Yangming by Yan Jun, specifically through the teachings of Wang Gen from the Taizhou School. Wang Gen emphasized the significance of life experiences and stressed the importance of aligning one's knowledge with their actions. He believed that wisdom could be attained by anyone, regardless of their social status.

He Xinyin was passionate about new ideas and ultimately decided that spreading these ideas and being a teacher were more important than pursuing a career in civil service. He abandoned his pursuit of a civil service career and attempted to put his ideas into practice by creating a self-sufficient community for his family in 1553. He centralized important matters such as education and tax payment within the community. This community was met with suspicion from the authorities and was forced to disband after only six years. He Xinyin was even sentenced to death for resisting the authorities, but was ultimately released thanks to the help of friends. He then moved to Beijing in 1560 and opened a discussion club that welcomed people from all social classes.

His time in Beijing was not without conflict as he became hostile towards high-ranking official Zhang Juzheng and became entangled in political disputes surrounding Grand Secretary Yan Song. This eventually led to him being forced to flee the city and change his name. He then traveled and lectured at private academies in central China. His troubles continued as the authorities' hostility towards him increased after 1576. He was eventually arrested in Nanjing in 1579 and killed in prison.

With other followers of the Taizhou school, he belonged to the left wing of Wang Yangming's followers, emphasizing the importance of nature in human nature, opposing the official Zhuist orthodoxy's rejection of desires. On the contrary, he considered material desires to be based on human nature and believed that they should only be selected and limited. This was the basis for his prioritizing self-expression over self-limitation. He understood ren, humanity, as the essence of the mind/heart (xin). He taught that one achieves wisdom through study and learning, especially from lived events and experiences. He also emphasized the importance of discussions between students and teachers, as well as among friends. According to him, self-improvement should begin in friendship, expand in service to the sovereign, and culminate in the cultivation of human nature. This marked a significant departure from the Confucian tradition, which places the basis of virtue on the relationship between parents and children.

His most significant surviving work was Yuanxue yuanjiang (原學原講; 'On Study and Discussion').
