= Chen Lu (painter) =

Chinese painter in the Ming dynasty

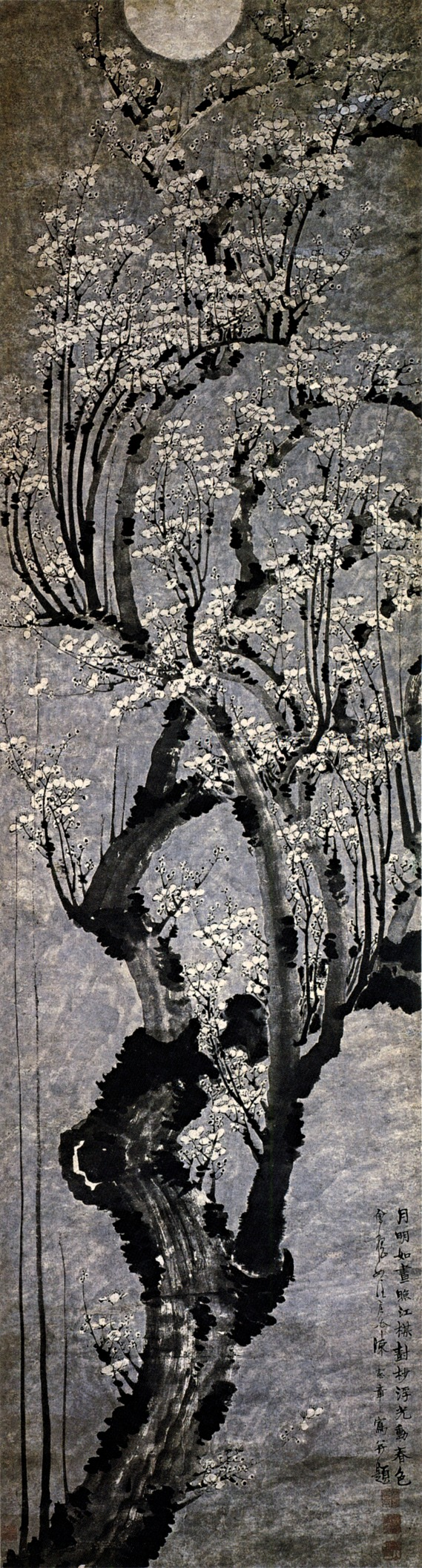
Chen Lu, Plum Blossoms, Tianjin Fine Art Museum

Chen Lu (simplified Chinese: 陈录; traditional Chinese: 陳錄; pinyin: Chén Lù; Wade–Giles: Ch'en Lu) was a Chinese painter in the early Ming Dynasty. His birth and death years are unknown.

Chen was born in Huiqi (會䅲, modern day Shaoxing in Zhejiang province). His courtesy name was Xianzhang (憲章) and his pseudonym was Ruyin Jushi (如隱居士). He was particularly skilled in painting plum, pine, and bamboo paintings.
