= Hu Yuan =

Chinese scholar

Hu Yuan (Chinese: 胡瑗, 993–1059), courtesy name Yizhi (Chinese: 翼之). Born in Hailing, Taizhou (today's Taizhou, Jiangsu). Since he lived in the Fort Anding in the modern-day Zichang County, he was also called "Mr. Anding" (Chinese: 安定先生, Ān dìng xiān sheng).

An educator from the Northern Song dynasty, he was considered one of the so-called "Three masters of the beginning of the Song dynasty" (宋初三先生). As an educator, he privileged the understating of the substance and function (Chinese: 體用) and literature (Chinese: 文) as the way of the Confucian sages.

He was also considered one of the forerunners of Neo-Confucianism, was a teacher of Cheng Yi, and wrote a comment on the Yijing. Zhu Xi regarded him as a relatively important Confucian of the Song dynasty

He was the ancestor of Hu Dunfu, a modern Chinese mathematician.
