= Liu Zongzhou =

Chinese Neo-Confucian scholar (1579–1645)

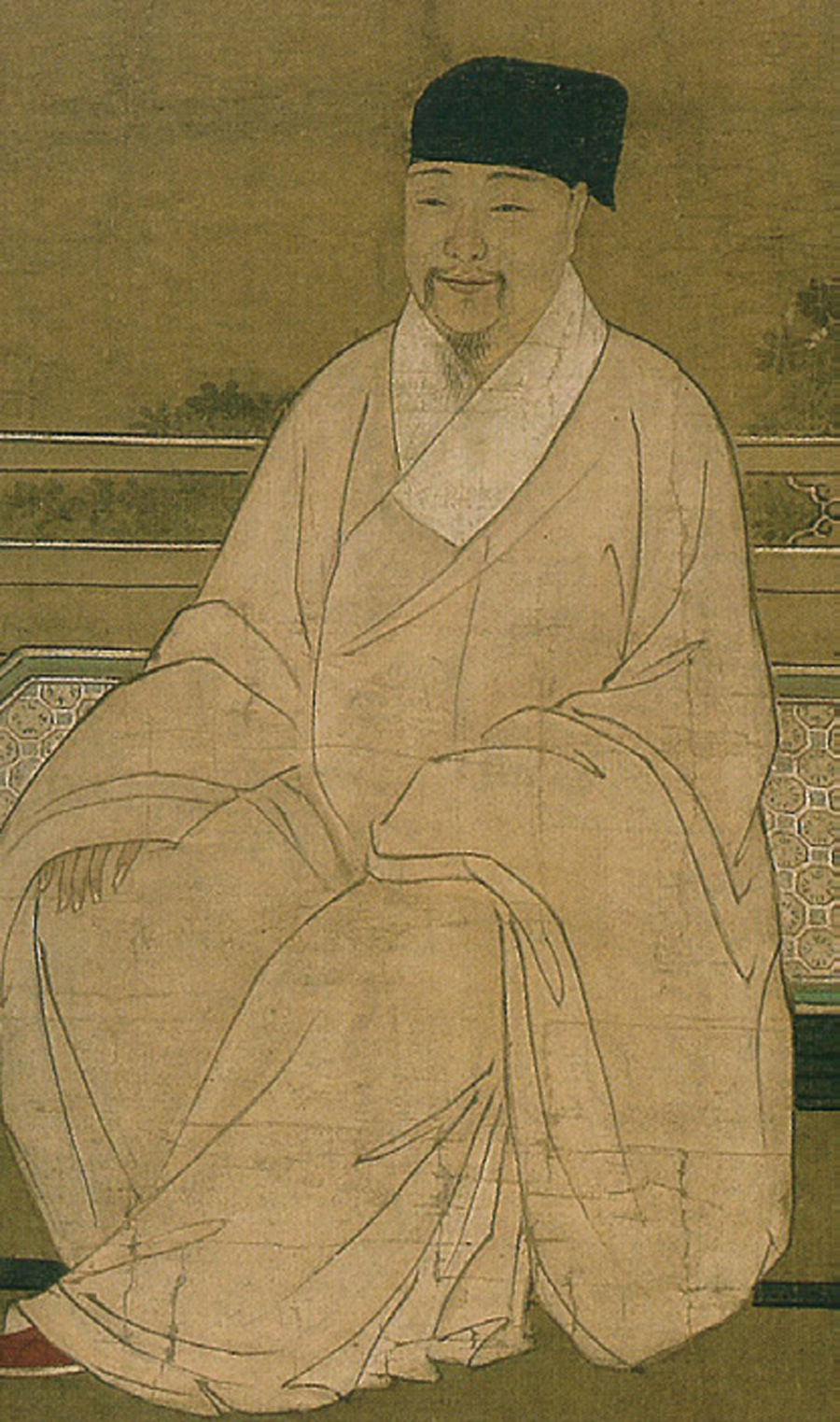
Liu Zongzhou

Liu Zongzhou (simplified Chinese: 刘宗周; traditional Chinese: 劉宗周; pinyin: Liú Zōngzhōu, 1579–1645), also known as Liu Jishan (simplified Chinese: 刘蕺山; traditional Chinese: 劉蕺山), courtesy name Qidong (起东). As he lectured at the Jishan Academy, later generations referred to him as Master Jishan (蕺山先生). He was a native of Shanyin County in Zhejiang (present-day Shaoxing). Liu was a prominent Neo-Confucianism philosopher, literary figure, and political actor during the late Ming dynasty, and one of the key representatives of the Zhedong School of Confucian thought. His writings are known for their dep2th and complexity, often regarded as abstruse and difficult to interpret.

Liu passed the imperial examination and obtained the jinshi degree in the 29th year of the Wanli reign (1601). During the Tianqi reign, he was dismissed from office after impeaching the powerful eunuch Wei Zhongxian. He was reinstated during the reign of the Chongzhen Emperor, but was later impeached once again. After the fall of Hangzhou during the transition from Ming to Qing, Liu died by starvation in protest. One of his students Zhu Yuan (祝渊) committed suicide by hanging himself. Another one of his students Wang Yushi (王毓蓍) committed suicide by drowning himself.

Throughout his life, Liu Zongzhou struggled to reconcile the divergent streams of Neo-Confucianism, particularly seeking to unify the teachings of the Song and Ming dynasties. His philosophical development underwent significant transformations: in his early years, he adhered to the Cheng-Zhu orthodoxy; in middle age, he turned toward the School of the Heart advocated by Wang Yangming; and in his later years, he grew wary of its tendency to converge with Chan Buddhism, leading to further shifts in his stance. His collected works were compiled in Collected Works of Liu Jishan (刘蕺山集), comprising seventeen volumes.

Liu had a profound influence in the final decades of the Ming dynasty, attracting a large following and giving rise to what became known as the Jishan School (蕺山学派). His thought deeply influenced later scholars such as Huang Zongxi and Wang Fuzhi. Huang Zongxi, in particular, drew heavily from Liu's philosophy in his compilation of the Records of Ming Confucianism (明儒学案).

== Life ==
Liu Zongzhou was born posthumously and was raised by his mother in the household of his maternal grandfather, Zhang Ying. Zhang, though never successful in the imperial examinations, was a learned man whose disciples included notable figures such as Xu Jie, Tao Wangling, and Zhou Yingzhong.

In 1597, Liu passed the provincial examination (juren) in Zhejiang, ranking 46th. In 1601, he achieved the highest degree of jinshi in the imperial examination and was appointed to the Censorate for initial administrative training. Shortly thereafter, he left office to observe a three-year mourning period following his mother's death. He studied under the scholar Xu Fuyuan from Deqing in Huzhou. In 1604, he was appointed as a xingren (a ceremonial messenger). The following year, he resigned to care for his family. He was reinstated in 1611 and later took leave again due to illness in 1614.

Beginning in 1621, during the reign of the Tianqi Emperor, Liu served as Director of Ceremonial Standards in the Ministry of Rites. He was promoted in 1622 to Assistant Supervisor of the Court of Imperial Entertainments, and in 1623 to Vice Minister of the Office of Heraldry. Known for his upright character and moral fortitude, he consistently voiced candid criticisms of court affairs. As Vice Minister of the Court of Imperial Stud, he was noted for his reluctance to accept appointments, requiring three or four requests before consenting. In 1624, he was promoted to Right Censor-in-Chief of the Office of Transmission, but offended the powerful eunuch Wei Zhongxian and was dismissed from office in 1625, returning to civilian life.

After the Chongzhen Emperor ascended the throne, Liu petitioned to rehabilitate officials such as Yang Lian and Zuo Guangdou who had been wronged under the previous regime. He was appointed Prefect of Shuntian (modern-day Beijing). In 1628, Liu submitted a memorial criticizing the emperor's hasty and harsh policies, warning: "Your Majesty's urgent drive for reform has bred an obsession with results. From utility arises penal law; from penal law, suspicion; and from suspicion, obstruction." Though the emperor found him overly pedantic, he admired his loyalty.

In 1629, during the Jisi Incident, Beijing was besieged and grain prices surged. Liu petitioned to abolish the Nine-Gate Tax, establish a market zone for the poor, distribute porridge to the elderly and infirm, and rigorously enforce local defense systems. He also urged the burial of fallen Ming soldiers within and beyond the city. During his tenure as Prefect, he revitalized city governance, resisted powerful local interests, and refused unreasonable demands from palace eunuchs. When a noble's retinue assaulted students of the Imperial Academy, Liu publicly punished them, having them caged at the city gate. He also enforced tax relief, urged the gentry to donate funds for student scholarships, and provided land for poor scholars. In 1630, citing illness, he returned to his hometown; the people of Beijing reportedly closed their shops to bid him farewell.

In 1636, the court recalled Liu to serve as Left Vice Minister of Works. He submitted a memorial criticizing the emperor’s overly harsh administration: "Your Majesty governs with excessive urgency, enforces laws too rigidly, issues orders too frequently, and treats scholars too lightly." He lamented the dysfunction of the bureaucracy, noting, "There are officials, but none who are useful; funds, but no practical use of them; generals who cannot command troops; soldiers who cannot fight bandits." Despite multiple censures, he remained outspoken. In 1641, the Chongzhen Emperor lamented the lack of upright officials, praising Liu's integrity and courage. He was reappointed, eventually rising to the post of Chief Censor (Left Censor-in-Chief). During this period, he undertook major bureaucratic reforms and submitted petitions restoring the reputation of General Lu Xiangsheng, who had been unjustly accused. Nevertheless, Liu was again dismissed from office soon after.

In March 1644, rebel leader Li Zicheng captured Beijing, and the Chongzhen Emperor committed suicide at Coal Hill. Liu, now a civilian, armed himself and marched to Hangzhou, urging the provincial governor Huang Mingjun to hold a mourning ceremony and organize resistance against the rebels. Together with former officials Zhu Datian, Zhang Zhengchen, and Xiong Rulin, he recruited a militia to support the Southern Ming cause. In May, the Prince of Fu (Zhu Yousong) ascended the throne in Nanjing and appointed Liu as Chief Censor once again. Liu, describing himself as a "solitary scholar from the countryside," repeatedly urged the court to launch a northern expedition to reclaim the capital. After impeaching officials Ma Shiying and Ruan Dacheng, however, he was dismissed and sent back to his hometown.

In 1645 (the second year of the Shunzhi reign under the Qing dynasty), the Manchu prince Dodo led Qing forces to capture Hangzhou. Liu, upon hearing the news while dining, pushed away his food and wept, declaring, "This is the destined time for me to meet my end." He resolved to starve himself to death in loyalty to the fallen dynasty. His disciple Wang Yushi drowned himself first, to which Liu remarked, "In my fifteen years of teaching, I produced but this one man." When other students pleaded with him to preserve his life, arguing that his death would be futile, Liu replied, "Indeed, to accomplish great deeds is better than dying. But I am old, and my strength is gone." After twenty days of fasting, he died on the eighth day of the intercalary sixth month, aged 68. Another student, Zhu Yuan, hanged himself two days before Liu's death.

== Thought ==
=== Ontology ===
Liu Zongzhou rejected Zhu Xi's dualistic theory of Li (Principal) and Qi (Matter) as fragmented and incoherent. Instead, he inherited and developed Zhang Zai's monistic Qi theory, asserting that Qi—the basic material substratum—is the ultimate origin of all cosmic phenomena. He declared: "The universe is filled with nothing but a single Qi," and "Heaven becomes heaven by gaining it; Earth becomes earth by gaining it; beings become beings by gaining it." Liu further clarified a system of interrelated concepts: Qi is the fundamental reality; Numbers refers to its inherent laws and patterns; Phenomenon refers to the concrete forms assumed by condensed Qi; and Name denotes the labels humans assign based on these images.

In Liu Zongzhou's writings, Dao and Li are effectively synonymous, both denoting the form-giving determinacy of being.Drawing upon Zhang Zai's assertion that "the Great Void is identical with Qi," (太虚即气) Liu rejected the notion that "the Void gives rise to Qi," (虚生气) arguing instead that the distinction between pure non-being and pure being is untenable. He wrote: "Between being and non-being, and yet simultaneously being and non-being—this is the Great Void." (非有非无之间，而即有即无，是为太虚) In Liu's conception, Qi is no longer merely the sub-phenomenal substrate, as understood by Zhu Xi, but approaches a dialectical category—embodying the unity of opposites in a manner strikingly akin to Hegelian logic.

Liu developed the teaching of "no Li apart from Qi", declaring: "Li is nothing more than the property of Qi; it is certainly neither prior to nor external to Qi." He emphasized that universal notions such as Heaven, Dao, and human nature are not transcendent entities but aggregates of particular phenomena. He saw the motion of Qi not as chaotic, but ordered under the governance of Tian Li (Heavenly Principal), likening this to the stars revolving harmoniously around the North Star. He further argued that human existence and activity are integral parts of the cosmos, and thus the investigation of cosmic principle is also a study of human nature—laying the foundation for his theories of mind and moral cultivation.

=== Theory of Mind and Human Nature ===
Liu's ontological claims culminate in his theory of mind and human nature (心性论), which posits form and Qi as the foundation of human subjectivity. Since Li does not exist independently of Qi, one cannot discuss human nature apart from the human mind. "There is no nature apart from the embodied mind," he wrote. Because everything is constituted by Qi, he denied the existence of a transcendent "nature of Li" (义理之性) apart from the "nature of Qi" (气质之性). For Liu, the latter is simply the inherent logic of Qi's operation, and thus it is the same as the "nature endowed by Heaven," which is good by nature. In contrast, Zhu Xi's dualism separates physical nature from moral nature, implying that physical nature is not necessarily good—a view Liu believed led to the moral relativism of thinkers such as Wang Gen.

Liu Zongzhou undertook a detailed investigation into the structure of consciousness, drawing a clear distinction between Xin (mind or cognitive faculty) and Yi (intention or volitional tendency). He emphasized that Yi is not an act that emanates from the mind, but rather the abiding disposition of the mind itself—an inherent structuring Li within the movement of Qi that constitutes mind. It is fundamentally immobile, serving as the underlying orientation of the mind rather than an actualized thought or reaction.

To elucidate the relationship between Xin and Yi, Liu employed the metaphor of a compass: Yi is like the compass needle that necessarily points south—it does not travel south, but is naturally disposed to orient in that direction. Likewise, Yi represents the mind's intrinsic moral inclination toward good and away from evil, functioning as the original vector that governs all subsequent cognitive and ethical activity. As Liu wrote: "Yi is what the mind tends toward—it is like the compass needle that must point south: it merely points south; it does not journey there."

Liu criticized Wang Yangming's "Four-Sentence Teaching" (王阳明四句教) for conflating Xin and Yi into the undifferentiated concept of Innate Knowing, a confusion he believed led to disarray among Wang's later followers. Yet Liu was not an adversary of Wang; rather, his distinction between Xin and Yi was an effort to address and clarify unresolved tensions within the School of Mind itself.

For Liu, Emotion arises from the interaction between internal Qi and external stimuli. Consequently, he rejected the division of "human mind" and "Heavenly mind" as two separate entities—where the former is desire and the latter principle. Instead, he maintained that the human mind is itself the Heavenly mind. He endorsed the central insight of Wang's School of Mind—that "there is no principle outside the embodied mind, and no learning outside the embodied mind" —and criticized Zhu Xi's method of "investigating things and extending knowledge" (格物穷理) as fragmented.

=== Theory of Moral Cultivation ===
The most distinctive aspect of Liu Zongzhou's philosophy lies in his theory of moral cultivation (工夫论), which revolves around two key concepts: self-vigilance in solitude (慎独, Shen Du) and sincerity of intention (诚意, Cheng Yi). Both terms trace their origins to Wang Yangming's School of Mind but also integrate elements from the Cheng-Zhu tradition. In his middle years, Liu focused primarily on Shen Du; in his later years, Cheng Yi became the central theme of his thought, marking the culmination of his philosophical system. His sophisticated analysis of the structure of consciousness represents a significant development of the work of Lu Jiuyuan and Wang Yangming, bringing the theory of mind to completion in the domain of moral praxis.

==== Self-Vigilance in Solitude (Shen Du) ====
The concept of Shen Du originates from the Great Learning and the Doctrine of the Mean. Liu elevated it into a comprehensive metaphysical and methodological principle. He wrote, "The essence of the gentleman's learning lies in Shen Du, and nothing more," and "There is no learning outside of Shen Du." In Liu's formulation, Shen Du means maintaining moral awareness and discipline even in isolation. He raised this to the level of a method for perceiving stillness (Jing) within the dynamic motion of Qi. His aim was to harmonize the Cheng-Zhu orthodoxy and Yangmingism, subsuming the moral practices of Confucius, Mencius, Zhu Xi, and Wang Yangming into a unified theory under Shen Du, thus avoiding the fragmentation he critiqued in other systems.

==== Sincerity of Intention (Cheng Yi) ====
Liu identified two major flaws in the later development of the School of Mind: one was a tendency toward mystical nihilism, and the other toward utilitarian expediency. In response, he proposed the doctrine of Cheng Yi as a corrective. He explained that the word Cheng (sincerity) should not be taken as an added quality but as a description of the mind's inherent nature: "It is not that the intention must be made sincere; rather, when intention is as it is, that is sincerity." Liu emphasized that moral cultivation must focus on intention itself, a dimension largely neglected by Wang Yangming's successors.
