= Fujiwara Seika =

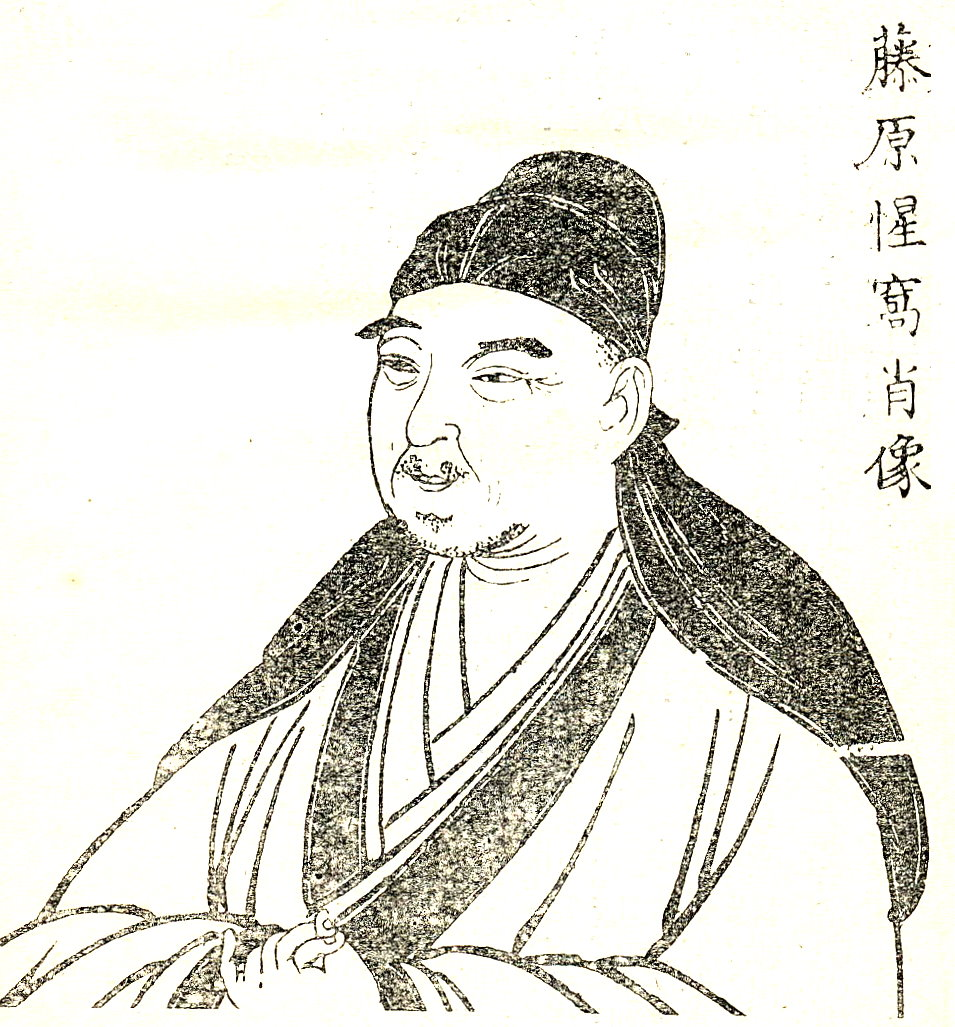
- Fujiwara Seika from Japanese book『先哲像伝』
- Born: 8 February 1561
- Died: 19 October 1619 (aged 58)

Philosophical work
- Region: East Asian philosophy: Japanese philosophy
- School: Cheng–Zhu school; Japanese Confucianism; Yangmingism

Fujiwara Seika (藤原 惺窩; February 8, 1561 – October 19, 1619) was a Japanese Neo-Confucian philosopher and writer during the Edo period.

His most well-known student was Hayashi Razan (1583–1657).

== Life ==
He was born in Harima Province (now Miki City, Hyogo Prefecture) on February 8, 1561 to the Reizei family. At the age of seven or eight he was sent to the Shōkoku-ji temple to become a Zen Buddhist priest. There, he studied Confucianism alongside his Zen studies. In 1596, Fujiwara attempted to travel to Ming China in order to study under an authentic Confucian master, but inclement weather forced the party to turn back. Fujiwara learned more about Neo-Confucianism from the Korean scholar Kang Hang.

== See also ==
- Neo-Confucianism in Japan
