= Cheng Duanli =

Chinese scholar and poet (1271–1345)

Cheng Duanli (simplified Chinese: 程端礼; traditional Chinese: 程端禮; pinyin: Chéng Duānlǐ, 1271–1345) was a Neo-Confucian scholar of the Yuan Dynasty in China, educator, poet, and philologist. He was also known by the courtesy names Jìngshū (敬叔) and Jìnglǐ 敬禮, and the art name Wèizhāi (畏齋).

== Biography ==
He came from Qingyuan Prefecture (now Yinzhou of Ningbo City in Zhejiang). Cheng Duanli was very talented in his childhood, at the age of 15 he was able to recite the "Six Classics" and had a good knowledge of the Cheng-Zhu school. He studied under Shǐ Méngqīng (史蒙卿) and spent a lifetime teaching scores of students.

He became the director of Jiandong Academy. He also served in official educational positions. He wrote a book called Chronological Syllabus for Study in the Cheng Family School, which used Zhu Xi's educational ideas to understand the canon. He supported a focused reading method and a graded approach to learning, which had to begin with Elementary learning and continue to studying of history and prose.

Cheng Duanli's writings strove to enshrine Confucian orthodoxy. His best-known work was The Graded Everyday Schedule of Study (程氏家塾讀書分年日程). Published in 1315, it corresponded with the re-opening of the system of Imperial Examination (that had mostly been defunct during the Yuan Dynasty rule) and was adopted officially across China posthumously earning its author an entry in the History of Yuan, the official history of the dynasty. The legacy of his book lasted further through Ming and Qing, serving as the basis of school curricula.
