= Ōshio Heihachirō =

Japanese samurai

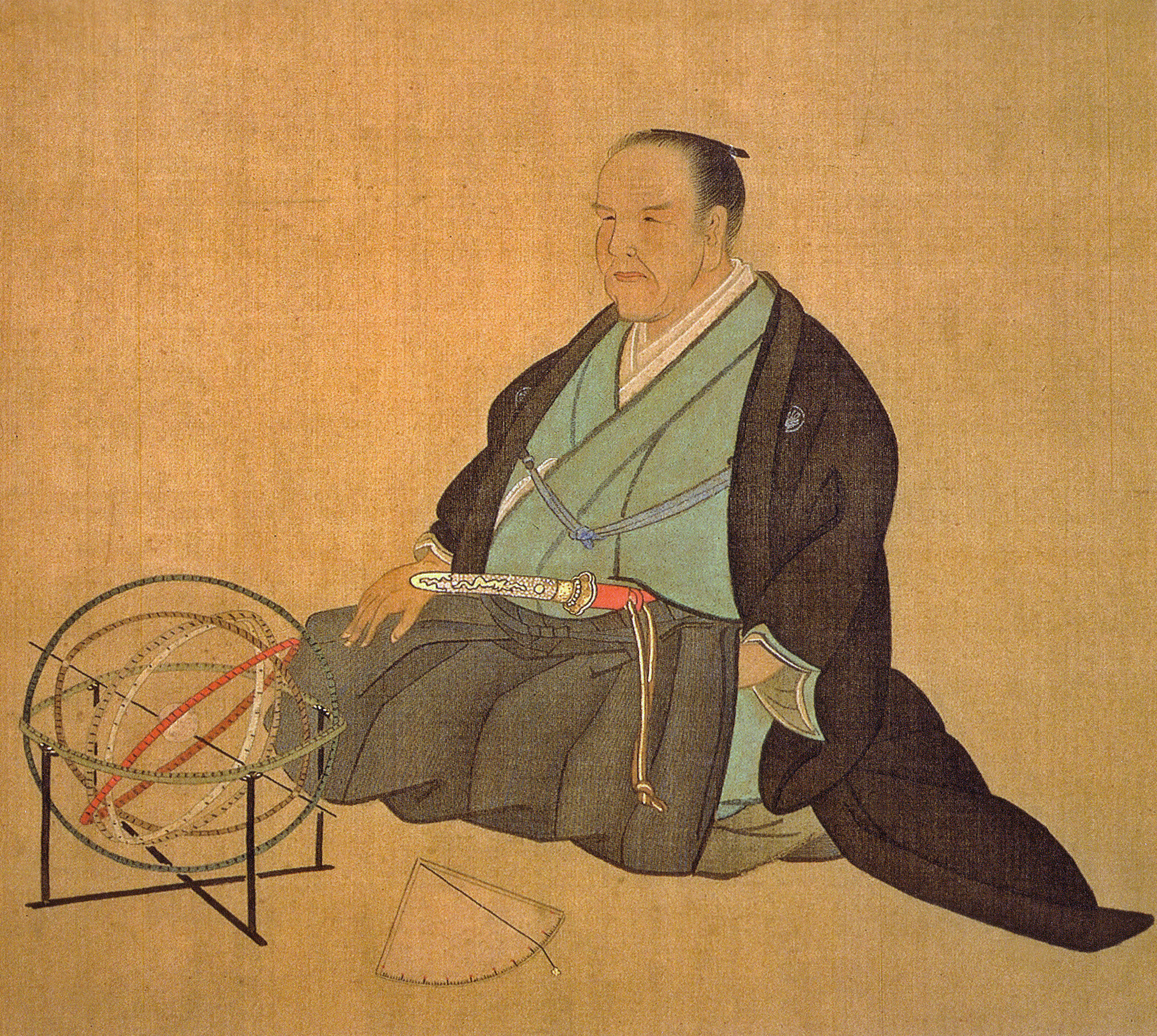
- Born: Ōshio Chūsai 大塩中斎; March 4, 1793
- Died: May 1, 1837 (aged 44); Ōsaka
- Cause of death: Self-immolation

Education
- Education: 陽明学, youmeigaku

Philosophical work
- Era: Edo-period
- Region: Ōsaka
- Notable ideas: Taikyō and Makoto

Ōshio Heihachirō (大塩 平八郎; March 4, 1793 – May 1, 1837) was a Japanese philosopher, revolutionary, writer, and yoriki who led an academy of Wang Yangming school (陽明学, youmeigaku) philosophy in Osaka. Despite his privileged status, he led a brief uprising against corrupt officials in the Tokugawa shogunate.

== Early life ==
Ōshio was born as the eldest son in a samurai family in 1793. At the age of 15 he discovered while researching his family's personal archive that one of his ancestors had been labeled as "dishonorable" because he spent much of his time writing in the company of prisoners, criminals, and commoners in defiance of social taboos. This finding was the immediate cause of his decision to become a disciple of Neo-Confucianism. At the age of 24 he read a book about the morals and precepts of Chinese philosopher Lü Kun (1536–1618) and later studied the works of his master Wang Yangming.

== Career ==
From the age of 13, Ōshio was employed as a yoriki. Among his responsibilities was serving as a police inspector and magistrate in Ōsaka. He quickly gained a reputation for personal honesty by refusing the bribes commonly offered to police officials by suspects to overlook their crimes. After fourteen years of service, he retired in 1830 as an act of protest over the appointment of a new supervisor known to be openly corrupt. Henceforth, he began a pilgrimage to the province of Ōmi, which led to his spiritual awakening.

When he returned to Ōsaka, he began writing and teaching about the Yōmeigaku and later founded his own private school, "Senshindō" (洗心洞). Ōshio spent the rest of his retirement as both headmaster and senior instructor. He also published a book, Senshindō Sakki (洗心洞箚記), a compilation of scripts used in his lectures.

== Philosophy ==
Ōshio built upon the teachings of Confucianism and the interpretation that learning innate knowledge could lead to inner peace, wisdom and the transcendence of life and death. His understanding of metaphysics was based on Wang Yangming's theories concerning taikyō (absolute spirit) and makoto (sincerity).

=== Taikyō (胎教) ===
Taikyō is the fundamental creative power and the source of everything in the universe. One must turn to the absolute spirit if one wants to overcome the false, conventional categories of distinction. The re-identification with this absolute spirit makes life easier. One should adopt an attitude of true nature, sincere acts and an indifference to the concept of death.

=== Makoto (誠) ===
Sincerity (makoto, 誠) is known in Buddhism for acting according to distinct rules and standards. Ōshio adopted the idea of sincerity from Wang Yangming and gave the idea a unique Japanese interpretation. His viewpoint was that one must act as a brave samurai who knows no fear of death. It also reflects the course of action Ōshio took during the rebellion.

== The rebellion ==
=== Cause ===
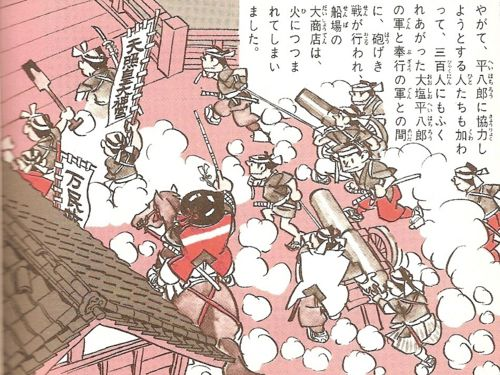
Image of the uprising led by Ōshio

The governing regime of the Edo period, founded and influenced by the Tokugawa clan since the Battle of Sekigahara in 1600, was, next to climate, the biggest cause of suffering. Both the peasants and lower samurai were affected by their actions. Agriculture and food production experienced a crisis due to a combination of failed harvests in both 1833 and 1836, the high taxes imposed by Tokugawa regime and daimyo domains, and the self-interested actions of local officials who were insulated from accountability by Japan's centuries-old caste system.

This crisis was very rare in the ever-prosperous Kansai region and unrest spread quickly into the big cities. The population protested against the sharp increase in food prices and began engaging in uchikowashi (destroying the residences of those deemed to be complicit in inflation) as an act of resistance. This led to the destruction of a large part of Ōsaka. The unrest alarmed both the Tokugawa shogunate and Ōshio, since many of his students could not afford to eat. The failed harvest, which caused famine and high rice prices, together with exacerbating fiscal problems and problems with foreign countries, came to be known as the Tenpō Crisis (1830–1844).

Ōshio's first instinct was to appeal directly to his fellow high-caste samurai and the wealthy residents of Ōsaka, in particular the merchants who controlled the supply of food. His hope that they would be willing to organize a relief effort proved to be in vain. The rich cared little for the welfare of those they saw as beneath them, and in any case, there was much more to gain from exploiting the crisis: profiteering, usury, and the buying up of land and properties from impoverished residents soon became commonplace. Ōshio lost faith in the established order, and with the aid of his students, began organizing what he intended to be a great rebellion.

=== Resistance ===
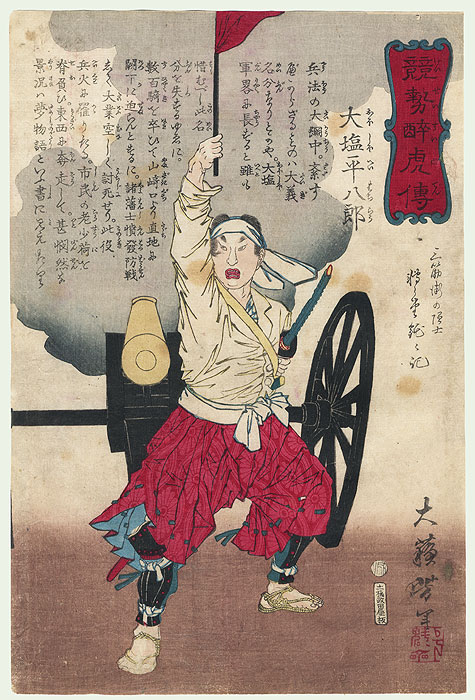
Ōshio Heihachirō pictured by Tsukioka Yoshitoshi

Ōshio and his allies were forced to start the rebellion earlier than planned because a traitor informed the authorities. On February 19, 1837, Ōshio set fire to his house in Ōsaka as a signal for his followers to assemble. He ordered them to raid government offices and burn tax records, then break into the local rice warehouses and distribute their contents to the hungry. Although planned in detail, the uprising proved to be a fiasco. The insurgents were poorly trained, equipped, and led, and while the shogunate could only send a hastily raised militia to deal with them, the government troops had superior weapons, armor, and leadership. His followers defeated, Ōshio and his son fled on horseback into the mountains. Rather than submit to the bakufu's justice, the two men committed suicide by burning down their shelter while praying together inside.

=== Effects ===
One can conclude that this bold action was a failure. More than 3,000 houses burned and 30,000 to 40,000 koku rice were destroyed. The majority of his followers took their own lives and from the 29 insurgents who were captured, only five survived weeks of enforced starvation and brutal interrogation. The survivors were salted so their bodies could be crucified and put on display. Yet despite its failure, Ōshio's rebellion, and the mere fact that one of the bakufu's own officials was behind it, helped spur important debates about the justice of Tokugawa rule.

== Sources ==
- Cullen, L. M. (2003) A history of Japan, 1582–1941. Cambridge: Cambridge.
- Jansen, M. B. (2000) The making of modern Japan. Cambridge: Cambridge.
