= Wu Cheng (philosopher) =

Chinese scholar and poet (1249–1333)

Wú Chéng or Wu Ch'eng (1249–1333) (traditional Chinese: 吳澄; simplified Chinese: 吴澄), courtesy names Yòuqīng (Chinese: 幼清) and Bóqīng (Chinese: 伯清), studio names Yīwúshānrén (Chinese: 一吾山人) and Caolu Xiansheng (草廬先生; lit. "Mr. Grass Hut"), was a scholar, educator, and poet who lived in the late Song dynasty and Yuan dynasty. He was one of the most influential Neo-Confucian thinkers in those eras, and his influence continued to be prominent in the Ming and Qing periods.

Wu Cheng was born in 1249 in Fuzhou, Jiangxi, into a poor family with a scholarly heritage. His early training was in the Zhu Xi (1130–1200) lineage, but he was also exposed to the idea of harmonizing the Zhu Xi teachings with those of Lu Xiangshan (1139–1193), and he also had an affinity for southern Daoism. This synthetic tendency was apparent in Wu's later writings and exerted an influence on the development of xinxue 心學 (the School of the Mind and Heart) in the Ming (1368–1644) and Qing (1644–1912) eras. He died in 1333.

Failing to pass the jinshi examination just prior to the invasion of Jiangxi by the Mongols, Wu supported the resistance forces of Wen Tianxiang (1236–1283). After the takeover, educators in the capital tried unsuccessfully to recruit him to serve the Yuan and instead disseminated his classical commentaries. He refused local appointments, but in 1309 he served in the Directorate of Education in Dadu (Beijing), leaving in 1312 over differences with those reinstituting the examination system, which had been defunct since the Mongol takeover. Wu had wished to broaden the classical curriculum beyond Zhu Xi's commentaries on the Four Books and proposed models that challenged the prevailing plan. In the 1320s he also served in the Historical Bureau in the capital.

Among Wu Cheng's contributions, there is a famous condemnation of the divination practice as described in the "Great Plan" (Hongfan 洪範) section of the Book of Documents, a classic for which he provided an alternative organization to the orthodox arrangement. According to him, Jizi, a virtuous relative of the last king of the Shang dynasty who was punished for remonstrating with the king, and who was responsible for the transmission of the teaching about divination prevailing among the opinions of nobles and ordinary people, was under the sway of Shang dynasty superstitions. The matter is discussed in Bernhard Karlgren's commentaries on the "Great Plan" (Nylan, 1992:169).

Wu wrote original and critical commentaries on almost all of the classics, and the Dao de jing, but his greatest achievements were philosophical, in discussing the limits on human understanding of ideas like taiji (the Great Ultimate), and in emphasizing the need to crystallize moral truths within oneself (ningdao 凝道). His attempt to synthesize the ideas of Zhu Xi and Lu Xiangshan led him into adopting Lu's ideas on interiority, thus anticipating the development of the Neo-Confucian School of Mind in the Ming and Qing eras. As a successful and popular teacher, Wu had many students over his long life, and it was as a mentor and inspiration to them that he made his greatest impact as a scholar in the Yuan era.

== General references ==
- Gedalecia, David. The Philosophy of Wu Ch’eng: A Neo-Confucian of the Yüan Dynasty. Bloomington: Indiana University, 1999.
- Gedalecia, David. A Solitary Crane in a Spring Grove: The Confucian Scholar Wu Ch’eng in Mongol China. Wiesbaden: Harrassowitz Verlag, 2000.
- Gedalecia, David. "Wu Ch'eng and the Perpetuation of the Classical Heritage in the Yüan," in Langlois, J.D. ed., China Under Mongol Rule. Princeton, N.J.: Princeton University Press, 1981.
- Gedalecia, David. "Wu Ch'eng's Approach to Internal Self-Cultivation and External Knowledge-Seeking," in Chan, Hok-lam and de Bary, W.T., eds. Yüan Thought: Essays on Chinese Thought and Religion Under the Mongols. New York: Columbia University Press, 1982.
- Nylan, Michael (1992). The Shifting Center: The Original "Great Plan" and Later Readings. Monumenta Serica monograph series, vol. 24. Sankt Augustin: Monumenta Serica. ISBN 9783805002936. ISSN 0179-261X.
