= Consanguinism =

Consanguinism is an element of Confucianism referenced in modern discussions of Chinese philosophy to describe the emphasis on kinship bonds and filial piety in Confucian ethics. The phrase “consanguineous affection” was popularized by scholar Liu Qingping in a series of essays written throughout the 2000s, and it has since become a major focus of current debates over the correlation between Confucian ethics and trends of corruption in modern Chinese society. While the term “consanguinity” simply refers to the blood relations shared between family members and their ancestors, many interpret it within the context of Confucianism to imply that these bonds serve as the supreme value on which all moral decisions should be based.

== Origins ==
=== In modern Chinese philosophy ===
The concept of consanguinism developed from a series of essays written by Liu Qingping in the early 2000s. In a 2007 paper published in Chinese philosophical journal Dao, Liu claims that the concept of “consanguineous affection” is a “distinctive spirit of Confucianism” that is vital to achieving the Confucian goal of “sagehood”. This assertion drew a lot of attention as a key part of a larger debate on modern Confucian ethics that has continued through today.

As Liu defines it, consanguinism has two “essential elements”. The first element is the widely understood idea that Confucians regard filial piety as a basis for human life and relationships. The second element is the belief that Confucians view the value of filial piety as paramount and place it above all other virtues when faced with an ethical dilemma.

In the same 2007 issue of Dao, a response to Liu Qingping's critique of Confucian ethics was published by prominent New Confucian Guo Qiyong. As a result of Guo's own importance in the Chinese Philosophy community, he and his essay (titled “Is Confucian Ethics a ‘Consanguinism’”) brought this term and the debates surrounding it to the forefront of Modern Chinese philosophical discussion.

=== In the Analects and Mencius ===
Although never directly used in either of the texts, the concepts behind the term “consanguinism” can be traced back the ideas of filial piety discussed in traditional Confucian writings. In both the Analects and Mencius, multiple passages are dedicated to illustrating the importance of family ties in the Confucian code of ethics. In Analects 1.2, Confucius’ disciple You Rou states that “filial piety and brotherly respect are the root of humaneness”. This claim is also supported by Confucius himself in section 1.6 when he adds that “a youth should be filial at home and be respectful to his elders abroad”. Similar emphasis on kinship bonds is provided throughout the Mencius. In section 4A27, Mencius claims that the substance of humaneness and righteousness can be found in serving one's parents and older brothers. The Mencius also asserts that consanguinity should be taken as the sole root of all human life. Liu references these and many other passages in his discussions of the modern idea of consanguineous affection and uses them to show how deeply rooted the concept is in traditional Confucianism.

== Debates surrounding consanguinism ==
The correspondence between Liu Qingping and Guo Qiyong in the 2007 issue of Dao sparked a larger debate in the realm of Modern Chinese Philosophy regarding the apparent relationship between the code of ethics laid out in Confucian texts and the presence of corruption and nepotism in Chinese society. At the center of this debate is the use of the term “consanguinism” to describe the nature of Confucian values. This topic has become one of the most prominent discussions in the realm of Modern Chinese philosophy, extending not only to various Chinese philosophers, but also to the wider community of scholars of Chinese philosophy around the world.

=== Consanguinism as a criticism of Confucianism ===
Critics of Confucian virtues use the idea of consanguinism to expose the ethical priorities that many believe are implied throughout various Confucian texts and teachings. Most of these critics—particularly Liu Qingping—believe that Confucians treat the concept of consanguineous affection as a supreme virtue that takes precedence over every other principle of life. Liu has also compared this tenet to the Christian idea of maintaining faith in God over everything, claiming Confucians see filial piety as the root of humaneness and therefore cannot criticize anyone acting under accordance with this principle even if they violate other Confucian virtues. In response to more commonly accepted interpretations of Confucian texts that argue that the concepts of benevolence and humaneness are of more significance than filial piety, critics claims that such interpretations directly contradict cases in which Mencius and Confucius promote loyalty to family rather than commitment to greater societal justice. Particularly, in several moral discussions featured throughout Mencius, the sage king Shun—regarded as a model for proper human behavior and benevolence—is said to have chosen to support family members rather than strictly uphold the law. Critics cite these arguments as evidence that Confucian ethics contribute to trends of nepotism and corruption within contemporary Chinese society because they can be viewed as justification for such behavior (Liu 2007).

=== Defense of Confucianism ===
In a response to various essays written by Liu Qingping criticizing Confucianism, Guo Qiyong argues that the understanding of consanguine love as the root of humaneness is the result of a misinterpretation of Confucian texts. Guo places more emphasis on Mencius’ discussions of the human heart-mind and its innate tendency towards good as the root of human behavior, citing the story of a person inclined to save a child from falling into a well because it is his immediate gut-reaction to do so. According to various Confuician and Neo-Confucian scholars, things born from heaven and from the heart-mind are the true root of Confucian ethics, and therefore it is filial piety that is the result of the greater Confucian concern for humanity rather than uprightness being the product of practicing filial piety. Stephen Angle proposes the additional idea that, while some Confucian virtues can be viewed as more important than others, it is most appropriate to take a situational approach to analyzing their importance in order to achieve harmony within various contexts. Angle points out the emphasis in Confucianism on avoiding “either/or” decisions and argues that harmony should not be interpreted as “a tradeoff between two competing values”. This analysis is used to support the idea that consanguine affection is not the supreme virtue of Confucianism, but rather a situationally important one. Other defenses of Confucianism argue that corruption related to familial ties is not a phenomenon specific to modern China. In a piece written with Guo Qiyong, Gong Jianping argues that the refusal to report crimes as an attempt to protect family members is a situation that has been observed all over the world all throughout history. He points out that in ancient Greece, the act of revealing the crimes of family members was believed to anger the Gods, while in some modern European countries, there are laws that give people the option to refuse to testify against a family member in court. Gong believes that the corruption observed in contemporary China is not so much a product of Confucian values, but rather a product of a natural human inclination to protect blood relatives
