= Kang Hang =

Korean scholar (1567–1618)

- Hangul: 강항
- Hanja: 姜沆
- RR: Gang Hang
- MR: Kang Hang

Kang Hang (Korean: 강항; Hanja: 姜沆; 1567–1618) was a Korean philosopher in Japan during the late Azuchi–Momoyama period and early Edo period. In 1597, he was taken prisoner by the forces of Toyotomi Hideyoshi during his second invasion of Joseon in the Imjin War. He was taken to Japan where he was influential in passing on neo-Confucianist ideas to the people there.
