= Neo-Confucianism =

Philosophical revival of Confucianism (13th–19th centuries)

Chinese name
- Traditional Chinese: 宋明理學
- Simplified Chinese: 宋明理学
- Literal meaning: "Song-Ming [dynasty] rational idealism"
Transcriptions
Standard Mandarin
- Hanyu Pinyin: Sòng-Míng lǐxué
- Bopomofo: ㄙㄨㄥˋ ㄇㄧㄥˊ ㄌㄧˇ ㄒㄩㄝˊ
- Gwoyeu Romatzyh: Sonq-Ming liishyue
- Wade–Giles: Sung^{4}-Ming^{2} li^{3}-hsüeh^{2}
- IPA: [sʊ̂ŋ mǐŋ lìɕɥě]
Yue: Cantonese
- Yale Romanization: Sung-Mìhng léih-hohk
- Jyutping: Sung3 Ming4 lei5 hok6
- IPA: [sʊŋ˧.mɪŋ˩ lej˩˧.hɔk̚˨]
Southern Min
- Tâi-lô: Sòng-Bîng lí-ha̍k

Vietnamese name
- Vietnamese: Tống nho
- Chữ Hán: 宋儒

Korean name
- Hangul: 성리학
- Hanja: 性理學
Transcriptions
- Revised Romanization: Seongnihak

Japanese name
- Kanji: 宋明理学
- Hiragana: そうみんりがく
Transcriptions
- Revised Hepburn: Sō Min rigaku
- Kunrei-shiki: Sô Min rigaku

Neo-Confucianism (Chinese: 宋明理學; pinyin: Sòng-Míng lǐxué, often shortened to lǐxué 理學, literally "School of Principle") is the cultural revival of Confucianism as an ethical, social, and religious system, which dominated Chinese philosophy from the 13th through the 19th century. Although its origin lies in the Tang dynasty, it was fully developed during the Song dynasty under the formulations of Zhu Xi (1130–1200), the tradition's central figure. Zhu, alongside Cheng Yi and Cheng Hao, comprises the dominant Cheng–Zhu school, in opposition to the later Lu–Wang school led by Wang Yangming and Lu Xiangshan.

Neo-Confucianism could have been an attempt to create a more rationalist and secular form of Confucianism by rejecting mystical elements of Taoism and Buddhism that had influenced Confucianism during and after the Han dynasty. Although the neo-Confucianists were critical of Taoism and Buddhism, the two did have an influence on the philosophy, and the neo-Confucianists borrowed terms and concepts. However, unlike the Buddhists and Taoists, who saw metaphysics as a catalyst for spiritual development, religious enlightenment, and immortality, the neo-Confucianists used metaphysics as a guide for developing a rationalist ethical philosophy. After the Mongol conquest of China in the thirteenth century, Chinese scholars and officials restored and preserved neo-Confucianism as a way to safeguard the cultural heritage of China.

== Origins ==
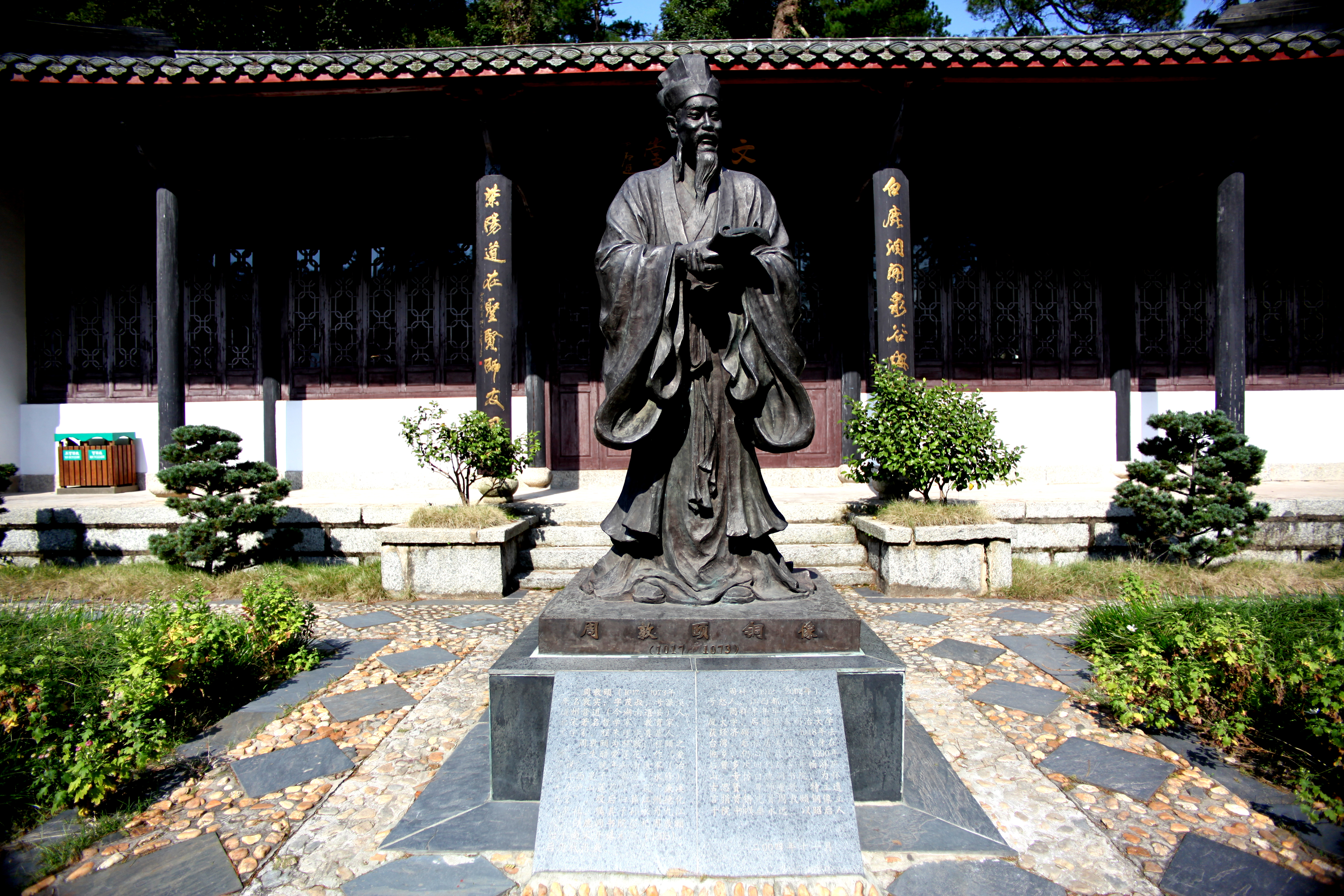
Bronze statue of Zhou Dunyi in White Deer Grotto Academy

Neo-Confucianism has its origins in the Tang dynasty; the Confucianist scholars Han Yu and Li Ao are seen as forebears of the neo-Confucianists of the Song dynasty. The Song dynasty philosopher Zhou Dunyi (1017–1073) is seen as the first true "pioneer" of neo-Confucianism, using Taoist metaphysics as a framework for his ethical philosophy. Neo-Confucianism was both a revival of classical Confucianism, updated to align with the social values of the Song dynasty, and a reaction to the challenges of Buddhism and Taoism philosophy and religion which emerged during the Zhou and Han dynasties. Although the neo-Confucianists denounced Buddhist metaphysics, Neo-Confucianism did borrow Taoist and Buddhist terminology and concepts.

One of the most important exponents of neo-Confucianism was Zhu Xi (1130–1200). His teachings were so influential that they were integrated into civil-service examination from approximately 1314 until 1905. He was a prolific writer, maintaining and defending his Confucian beliefs of social harmony and proper personal conduct. One of his most remembered was the book Family Rituals, where he provided detailed advice on how to conduct weddings, funerals, family ceremonies, and the veneration of ancestors. Buddhist thought soon attracted him, and he began to argue in Confucian style for the Buddhist observance of high moral standards. He also believed that it was important to practical affairs that one should engage in both academic and philosophical pursuits, although his writings are concentrated more on issues of theoretical (as opposed to practical) significance. He is reputed to have written many essays attempting to explain how his ideas were not Buddhist or Taoist and included some heated denunciations of Buddhism and Taoism. After the Xining era (1068–1077), Wang Yangming (1472–1529) is commonly regarded as the most important Neo-Confucian thinker. Wang's interpretation of Confucianism denied the rationalist dualism of Zhu's orthodox philosophy.

There were many competing views within the neo-Confucian community, but overall, a system emerged that resembled both Buddhist and Taoist (Daoist) thought of the time and some of the ideas expressed in the I Ching (Book of Changes) as well as other yin yang theories associated with the Taiji symbol (Taijitu). A well known neo-Confucian motif is paintings of Confucius, Buddha, and Lao Tzu all drinking out of the same vinegar jar, paintings associated with the slogan "The three teachings are one!"

While neo-Confucianism incorporated Buddhist and Taoist ideas, many neo-Confucianists strongly opposed Buddhism and Taoism. Indeed, they rejected the Buddhist and Taoist religions. One of Han Yu's most famous essays decries the worship of Buddhist relics. Nonetheless, neo-Confucian writings adapted Buddhist thoughts and beliefs to the Confucian interest. In China, neo-Confucianism was an officially recognized creed from its development during the Song dynasty until the early twentieth century, and lands in the sphere of Song China (Vietnam, Korea, and Japan) were all deeply influenced by neo-Confucianism for more than half a millennium.

== Philosophy ==
Neo-Confucianism is a social and ethical philosophy using metaphysical ideas, some borrowed from Taoism, as its framework. The philosophy can be characterized as humanistic and rationalistic, with the belief that the universe could be understood through human reason, and that it was up to humanity to create a harmonious relationship between the universe and the individual.

The rationalism of neo-Confucianism is in contrast to the mysticism of the previously dominant Chan Buddhism. Unlike the Buddhists, the neo-Confucians believed that reality existed, and could be understood by humankind, even if the interpretations of reality were slightly different depending on the school of neo-Confucianism.

But the spirit of Neo-Confucian rationalism is diametrically opposed to that of Buddhist mysticism. Whereas Buddhism insisted on the unreality of things, Neo-Confucianism stressed their reality. Buddhism and Taoism asserted that existence came out of, and returned to, non-existence; Neo-Confucianism regarded reality as a gradual realization of the Great Ultimate... Buddhists, and to some degree, Taoists as well, relied on meditation and insight to achieve supreme reason; the Neo-Confucianists chose to follow Reason.

The importance of li in Neo-Confucianism gave the movement its Chinese name, literally "The study of Li".

In the view of Neo-Confucians, the true form of Confucianism had been lost after Mencius as "later" Confucians were more concerned with the vehicles of knowledge such as classics or literary writing rather than the "values that all should share." They claimed that "later" Confucians focused on correct governance (found in the canonical texts) to the exclusion of "correct learning," the necessary basis for moral order. Their ideal of moral order, which could be inculcated by scholars outside of government, stood in contrast with previous ideas of moral instruction by ruling authorities. Neo-Confucians could be distinguished by their stronger concern with personal ethics and morals. Politically, Neo-Confucians also opposed centralization in the imperial court and instead argued for more local autonomy and the creation of lateral, community-centred institutions for social improvement. These voluntary local literati organizations focused on local education and local relief instead of aligning with the requirements of government service or government officials. The growing numbers of literati who did not serve in government but saw themselves as the equals of officials, capable of bottom-up collective action, constrained the authority of the local officials.

== Schools ==
Neo-Confucianism was a heterogeneous philosophical tradition, and is generally categorized into two different schools.

=== Two-school model vs. three-school model ===
In medieval China, the mainstream of neo-Confucian thought, dubbed the "Tao school", had long categorized a thinker named Lu Jiuyuan among the unorthodox, non-Confucian writers. However, in the 15th century, the esteemed philosopher Wang Yangming took sides with Lu and critiqued some of the foundations of the Tao school, albeit not rejecting the school entirely. Objections arose to Yangming's philosophy within his lifetime, and shortly after his death, Chen Jian (1497–1567) grouped Wang together with Lu as unorthodox writers, dividing neo-Confucianism into two schools. As a result, neo-Confucianism today is generally categorized into two different schools of thought. The school that remained dominant throughout the medieval and early modern periods is called the Cheng–Zhu school for the esteem it places in Cheng Yi, Cheng Hao, and Zhu Xi. The less dominant, opposing school was the Lu–Wang school, based on its esteem for Lu Jiuyuan and Wang Yangming.

In contrast to this two-branch model, the New Confucian Mou Zongsan argues that there existed a third branch of learning, the Hu-Liu school, based on the teachings of Hu Hong (Hu Wufeng, 1106–1161) and Liu Zongzhou (Liu Jishan, 1578–1645). The significance of this third branch, according to Mou, was that they represented the direct lineage of the pioneers of neo-Confucianism, Zhou Dunyi, Zhang Zai and Cheng Hao. Moreover, this third Hu-Liu school and the second Lu–Wang school, combined, form the true mainstream of neo-Confucianism instead of the Cheng–Zhu school. The mainstream represented a return to the teachings of Confucius, Mengzi, the Doctrine of the Mean and the Commentaries of the Book of Changes. The Cheng–Zhu school was therefore only a minority branch based on the Great Learning and mistakenly emphasized intellectual studies over the study of sagehood.

=== Cheng–Zhu school ===
Zhu Xi's formulation of the neo-Confucian world view is as follows. He believed that the Tao (Chinese: 道; pinyin: dào; lit. 'way') of Tian (Chinese: 天; pinyin: tiān; lit. 'heaven') is expressed in principle or li (Chinese: 理; pinyin: lǐ), but that it is sheathed in matter or qi (Chinese: 氣; pinyin: qì). In this, his system is based on Buddhist systems of the time that divided things into principle (again, li), and function (Chinese: 事; pinyin: shì). In the neo-Confucian formulation, li in itself is pure and almost-perfect, but with the addition of qi, base emotions and conflicts arise. Human nature is originally good, the neo-Confucians argued (following Mencius), but not pure unless action is taken to purify it. The imperative is then to purify one's li. However, in contrast to Buddhists and Taoists, neo-Confucians did not believe in an external world unconnected with the world of matter. In addition, neo-Confucians in general rejected the idea of reincarnation and the associated idea of karma.

Different neo-Confucians had differing ideas for how to do so. Zhu Xi believed in gewu (Chinese: 格物; pinyin: géwù), the Investigation of Things, essentially an academic form of observational science, based on the idea that li lies within the world.

=== Lu–Wang school ===
Wang Yangming (Wang Shouren), probably the second most influential neo-Confucian, came to another conclusion: namely, that if li is in all things, and li is in one's heart-mind, there is no better place to seek than within oneself. His preferred method of doing so was jingzuo (Chinese: 靜坐; pinyin: jìngzuò; lit. 'quiet sitting'), a practice that strongly resembles Chan (Zen) meditation, or zuochan (Japanese: 座禅; Chinese: 坐禪; pinyin: zuòchán; lit. 'seated meditation'). Wang Yangming developed the idea of innate knowing, arguing that every person knows from birth the difference between good and evil. Such knowledge is intuitive and not rational. These revolutionizing ideas of Wang Yangming would later inspire prominent Japanese thinkers like Motoori Norinaga, who argued that because of the Shinto deities, Japanese people alone had the intuitive ability to distinguish good and evil without complex rationalization. Wang Yangming's school of thought (Ōyōmei-gaku in Japanese) also provided, in part, an ideological basis for some samurai who sought to pursue action based on intuition rather than scholasticism. In doing so, it also provided an intellectual foundation for the radical political actions of low ranking samurai in the decades prior to the Meiji Restoration (1868), in which the Tokugawa shogunate (1600–1868) was overthrown.

== In Korea ==
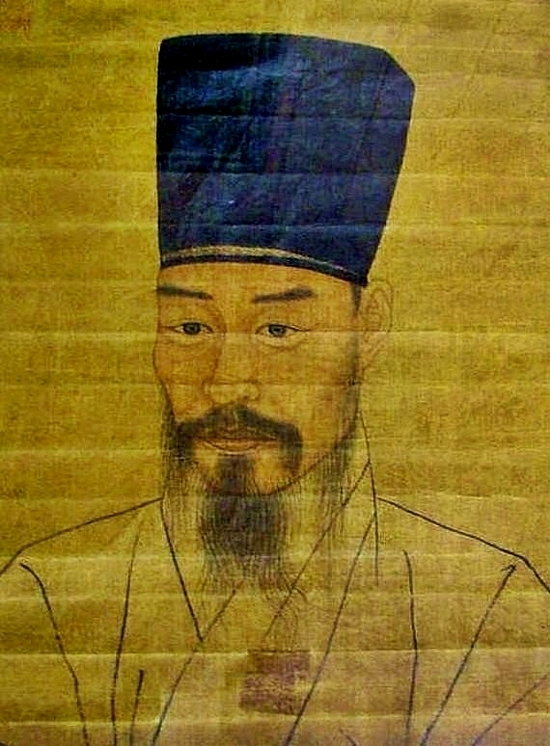
Portrait of Cho Kwangjo

In Joseon Korea, neo-Confucianism was established as the state ideology. The Yuan occupation of the Korean Peninsula introduced Zhu Xi's school of neo-Confucianism to Korea. Neo-Confucianism was introduced to Korea by An Hyang during the Goryeo dynasty. At the time that he introduced neo-Confucianism, the Goryeo dynasty was in the last century of its existence and influenced by the Mongol Yuan dynasty.

Many Korean scholars visited China during the Yuan era and An was among them. In 1286, he read a book of Zhu Xi in Yanjing and was so moved by it that he transcribed the book in its entirety and came back to Korea with it. It greatly inspired Korean intellectuals at the time and many, predominantly from the middle class and disillusioned with the excesses of organized religion (namely Buddhism) and the old nobility, embraced neo-Confucianism. The newly rising neo-Confucian intellectuals were leading groups aimed at the overthrow of the old (and increasingly foreign-influenced) Goryeo dynasty.

After the fall of Goryeo and the establishment of the Joseon dynasty by Yi Song-gye in 1392, neo-Confucianism was installed as the state ideology. Buddhism, and organized religion in general, was considered poisonous to the neo-Confucian order. Buddhism was accordingly restricted and occasionally persecuted by Joseon. As neo-Confucianism encouraged education, a number of neo-Confucian schools (seowon and 향교 hyanggyo) were founded throughout the country, producing many scholars including Cho Kwangjo (1482–1520), Yi Hwang (pen name T'oegye; 1501–1570) and Yi I (1536–1584).

In the early 16th century, Jo attempted to transform Joseon into an ideal neo-Confucian society with a series of radical reforms until he was executed in 1520. Despite this, neo-Confucianism soon assumed an even greater role in the Joseon dynasty. Soon neo-Confucian scholars, no longer content to only read and remember the Chinese original precepts, began to develop new neo-Confucian theories. Yi Hwang and Yi I were the most prominent of these new theorists.

Yi Hwang's most prominent disciples were Kim Sŏngil (1538–1593), Yu Sŏngnyong (1542–1607) and Chŏng Ku (1543–1620), known as the "three heroes". They were followed by a second generation of scholars who included Chang Hyŏn'gwang (1554–1637) and Chang Hŭnghyo (敬堂 張興孝, 1564–1633), and by a third generation (including Hŏ Mok, Yun Hyu, Yun Sŏndo and Song Si-yŏl) who brought the school into the 18th century.

But neo-Confucianism became so dogmatic in a relatively rapid time that it prevented much needed socioeconomic development and change, and led to internal divisions and criticism of many new theories regardless of their popular appeal. For instance, Wang Yangming's theories, which were popular in the Chinese Ming dynasty, were considered heresy and severely condemned by Korean neo-Confucianists. Furthermore, any annotations on Confucian canon different from Zhu Xi were excluded. Under Joseon, the newly emerging ruling class called Sarim also split into political factions according to their diversity of neo-Confucian views on politics. There were two large factions and many subfactions.

During the Japanese invasions of Korea (1592–1598), many Korean neo-Confucian books and scholars were taken to Japan and influenced Japanese scholars such as Fujiwara Seika and affected the development of Japanese neo-Confucianism.

== In Vietnam ==
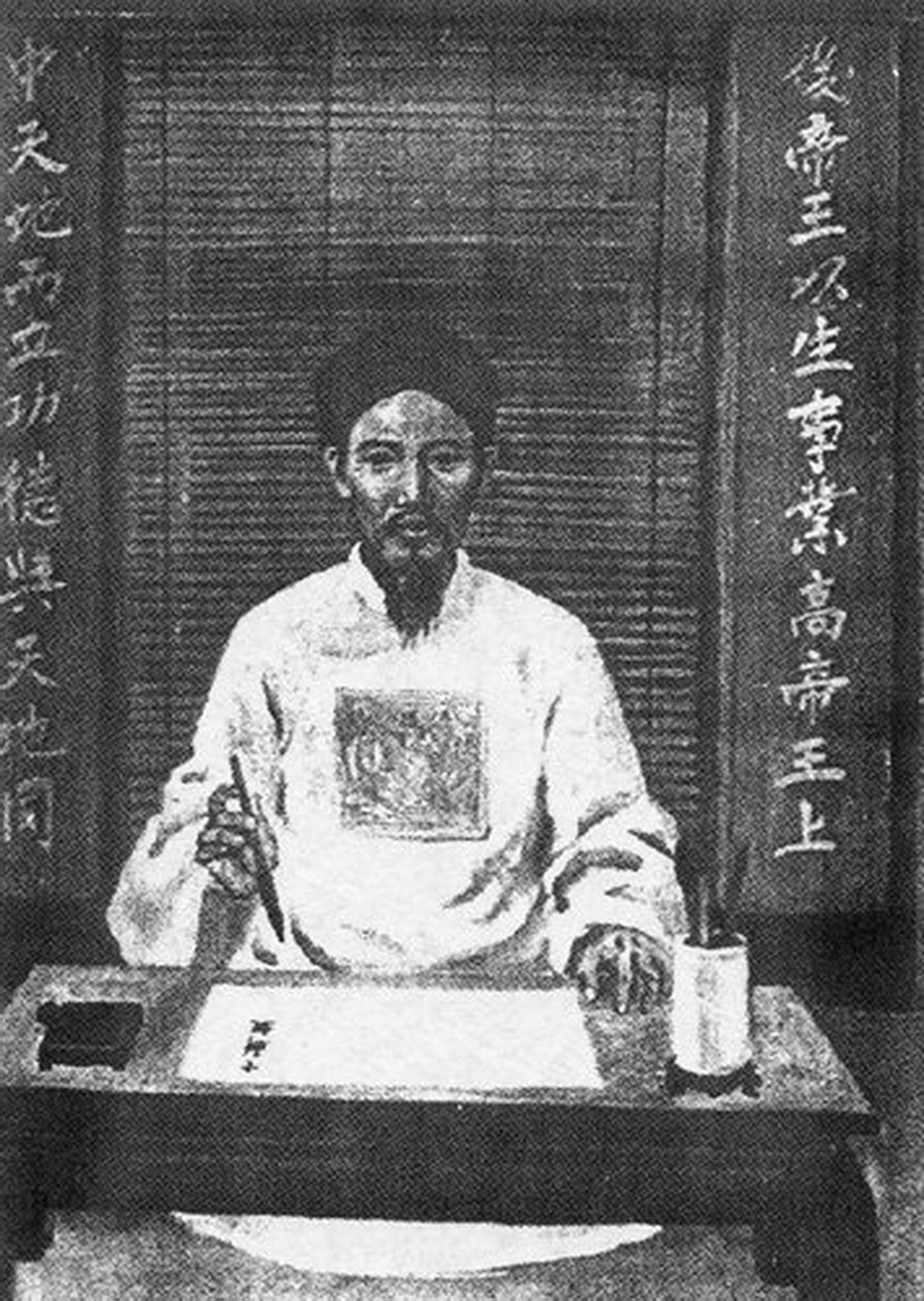
Portrait of Chu Văn An (1292–1370), prominent Vietnamese Confucianist teacher in 14th century.

In 1070, emperor Lý Thánh Tông opened first Confucius university in Hanoi named Văn Miếu. The Lý, Trần court expanded the Confucianism influences in Vietnamese Mandarin through year examinations, continued the model of Tang dynasty until being annexed by the Ming invaders in 1407. In 1460, emperor Lê Thánh Tông of Lê dynasty adopted Neo-Confucianism as Đại Việt's basic values.

== Bureaucratic examinations ==
Neo-Confucianism became the interpretation of Confucianism whose mastery was necessary to pass the bureaucratic examinations by the Ming, and continued in this way through the Qing dynasty until the end of the Imperial examination system in 1905. However, many scholars such as Benjamin Elman have questioned the degree to which their role as the orthodox interpretation in state examinations reflects the degree to which both the bureaucrats and Chinese gentry actually believed those interpretations, and point out that there were very active schools such as Han learning which offered competing interpretations of Confucianism.

The competing school of Confucianism was called the Evidential School or Han Learning and argued that neo-Confucianism had caused the teachings of Confucianism to be hopelessly contaminated with Buddhist thinking. This school also criticized neo-Confucianism for being overly concerned with empty philosophical speculation that was unconnected with reality.

== Confucian canon ==
The Confucian canon as it exists today was essentially compiled by Zhu Xi. Zhu codified the canon of Four Books (the Great Learning, the Doctrine of the Mean, the Analects of Confucius, and the Mencius) which in the subsequent Ming and Qing dynasties were made the core of the official curriculum for the civil service examination.

== Prominent neo-Confucian scholars ==
=== China ===
- Cheng Yi (1033–1107) and Cheng Hao (1032–1085)
- Lu Xiangshan also known as Lu Jiuyuan (1139–1193)
- Ouyang Xiu (1007–1072)
- Shao Yong (1011–1077)
- Su Shi, also known as Su Dongpo (1037–1101)
- Wang Yangming also known as Wang Shouren
- Wu Cheng (1249–1333)
- Ye Shi (1150–1223)
- Zhang Shi (1133–1180)
- Zhang Zai (1020-1077)
- Zhou Dunyi (1017–1073)
- Zhu Xi (1130–1200)
- Cheng Duanli (1271–1345)

=== Korea ===
- An Hyang (1243–1306)
- U T'ak (1263–1342)
- Yi Saek (1328–1396)
- Chŏng Mong-ju (1337–1392)
- Chŏng Tojŏn (1342–1398)
- Kil Chae (1353–1419)
- Ha Ryun
- Kwŏn Kŭn
- Chŏng Inji (1396–1478)
- Kim Sukcha
- Kim Chong-jik (1431–1492)
- Nam Hyo'on
- Kim Koengp'il
- Cho Kwangjo (1482–1519)
- Sŏ Kyŏngdŏk
- Yi Ŏnjŏk
- Yi Hwang (Pen name Toegye) (1501–1570)
- Cho Sik (1501–1572)
- Yu Sŏngnyong
- Yi Hang
- Kim Inhu
- Ki Taesŭng (1527–1572)
- Song Ikp'il (1534–1599)
- Sŏng Hon (1535–1598)
- Yi I (Pen name Yulgok) (1536–1584)
- Kim Jangsaeng (1548–1631)
- Song Si-yŏl (1607–1689)
- Yi Kan (1677–1727)
- Yi Ik (1681–1763)
- Han Wŏnjin (1682–1751)
- Hong Taeyong (1731–1783)
- Pak Chiwŏn (1737–1805)
- Pak Chega (1750–1815)
- Chŏng Yagyong (1762–1836)

=== Japan ===
- Fujiwara Seika (1561–1619)
- Hayashi Razan (1583–1657)
- Nakae Tōju (1608–1648)
- Yamazaki Ansai (1619–1682)
- Kumazawa Banzan (1619–1691)
- Yamaga Sokō (1622–1685)
- Itō Jinsai (1627–1705)
- Kaibara Ekken (also known as Ekiken) (1630–1714)
- Arai Hakuseki (1657–1725)
- Ogyū Sorai (1666–1728)
- Nakai Chikuzan (1730–1804)
- Ōshio Heihachirō (1793–1837)

=== Vietnam ===
- Lê Văn Thịnh (1050–1096)
- Bùi Quốc Khái (1141–1234)
- Trần Thái Tông (1218–1277)
- Trương Hán Siêu (1274–1354)
- Chu Văn An (1292–1370)
- Lê Quát (1319–1386)
- Nguyễn Trãi (1380–1442)
- Ngô Sĩ Liên (1400–1498)
- Lê Thánh Tông (1442–1497)
- Nguyễn Bỉnh Khiêm (1491–1585)
- Lê Quý Đôn (1726–1784)
- Nguyễn Khuyến (1835–1909)
- Phan Đình Phùng (1847–1896)
- Minh Mạng (1791–1841)
- Tự Đức (1829–1883)

== Bibliography ==
- Chan, Wing-tsit (1963), A Sourcebook of Chinese Philosophy, Princeton: Princeton University Press, ISBN 978-0-691-07137-4
- Chan, Wing-tsit (1946). China. Berkeley and Los Angeles: University of California Press.
- Craig, Edward (1998). Routledge Encyclopedia of Philosophy, Volume 7. Taylor & Francis. ISBN 978-0-415-07310-3.
- de Bary, William Theodore (1989). The Message of the Mind in Neo-Confucianism. New York: Columbia University Press. ISBN 0231068085.
- Huang, Siu-chi (1999). Essentials of Neo-Confucianism: Eight Major Philosophers of the Song and Ming Periods. Westport: Greenwood Press.
- Levinson, David; Christensen, Karen, eds. (2002). Encyclopedia of Modern Asia. Vol. 4. Charles Scribner's Sons. pp. 302–307.
- Mair, Victor H., ed. (2001). The Columbia History of Chinese Literature. New York: Columbia University Press. ISBN 0-231-10984-9. (Amazon Kindle edition).
