= Wang Yangming =

Chinese official and philosopher (1472–1529)

Wang Shouren
- Portrait of Wang

Viceroy of Liangguang
- In office 1527–1529
- Preceded by: Yao Mo
- Succeeded by: Zhang Jing

Minister of War in the Southern Capital
- In office 1521–1527

Grand coordinator of Nangan
- In office 1472–1529
- Preceded by: Wen Sen
- Succeeded by: Nie Xian

Personal details
- Born: 26 October 1472 Yuyao, Zhejiang
- Died: 9 January 1529 (aged 56) Nan'an fu, Jiangxi (present-day Ganzhou)
- Spouse: Lady Zhu
- Occupation: Statesman, general, neo-Confucian philosopher

Philosophical work
- School: Confucianism
- Notable ideas: Yangmingism, Unity of knowledge and action, the streets are full of saints

Chinese name
- Traditional Chinese: 王陽明
- Simplified Chinese: 王阳明
Transcriptions
Standard Mandarin
- Hanyu Pinyin: Wáng Yángmíng
Yue: Cantonese
- Yale Romanization: Wòhng Yèuhngmìhng
- Jyutping: Wong4 Joeng4ming4

Shouren (given name)
- Chinese: 守仁
Transcriptions
Standard Mandarin
- Hanyu Pinyin: Shǒurén
Yue: Cantonese
- Yale Romanization: Sáuyàhn
- Jyutping: Sau2jan4

Bo'an (courtesy name)
- Chinese: 伯安
Transcriptions
Standard Mandarin
- Hanyu Pinyin: Bó'ān
Yue: Cantonese
- Yale Romanization: Baakōn
- Jyutping: Baak3on1

Yangmingzi (art name)
- Traditional Chinese: 陽明子
- Simplified Chinese: 阳明子
Transcriptions
Standard Mandarin
- Hanyu Pinyin: Yángmíngzǐ
Yue: Cantonese
- Yale Romanization: Yèuhngmìhngjí
- Jyutping: Joeng4ming4zi2

Wencheng (posthumous name)
- Chinese: 文成
Transcriptions
Standard Mandarin
- Hanyu Pinyin: Wénchéng
Yue: Cantonese
- Yale Romanization: Màhnsìhng
- Jyutping: Man4sing4

Earl of Xinjian (nobility title)
- Chinese: 新建伯
Transcriptions
Standard Mandarin
- Hanyu Pinyin: Xīnjiàn Bó
Yue: Cantonese
- Yale Romanization: Sān'gin Baak
- Jyutping: San1gin3 Baak3

Wang Shouren (Chinese: 王守仁, 26 October 1472 – 9 January 1529), courtesy name Bo'an (Chinese: 伯安), art name Yangmingzi (traditional Chinese: 陽明子; simplified Chinese: 阳明子), usually referred to as Wang Yangming (traditional Chinese: 王陽明; simplified Chinese: 王阳明), was a Chinese statesman, general, and neo-Confucian philosopher during the Ming dynasty. After Zhu Xi, he is commonly regarded as the most important neo-Confucian thinker, for his interpretations of Confucianism that denied the rationalist dualism of the orthodox philosophy of Zhu Xi. Wang and Lu Xiangshan are regarded as the founders of the Lu–Wang school, or the School of the Mind.

In China, Japan, and Western countries, he is known by his honorific name rather than his private name.

== Life and times ==
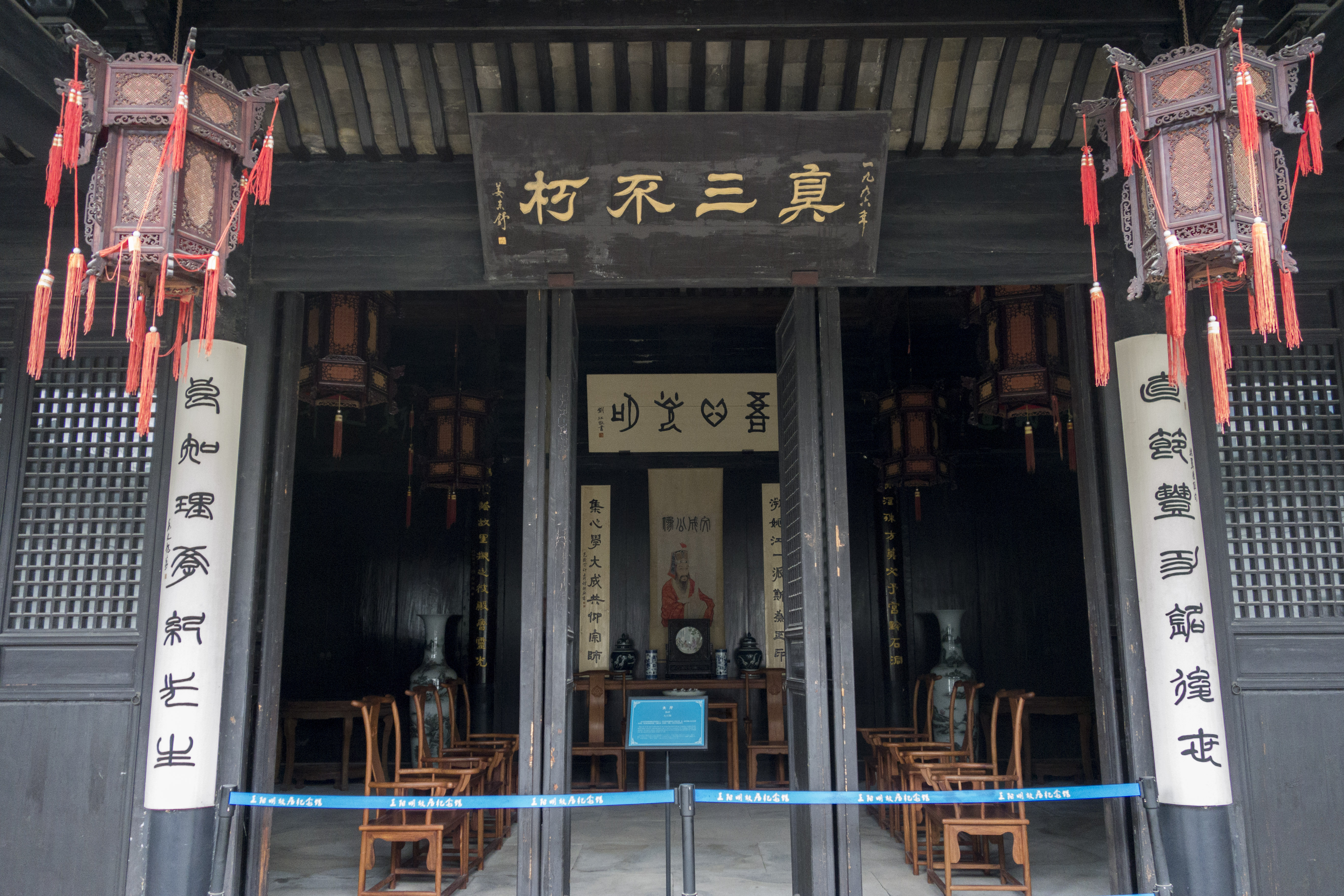
Grand Hall, Wang Yangming's former residence

Wang was born in Yuyao, Zhejiang Province, to a scholarly family with a tradition of bureaucratic service. His father, Wang Hua, was first (Zhuangyuan, 狀元) in the Imperial Examination of 1481, and rose to become the vice-minister of the Ministry of Rites, but was later demoted and subsequently expelled from government service for having offended Liu Jin, a eunuch.

Wang earned the juren degree in 1492 and the jinshi degree in 1499. He later served as an executive assistant in various government departments until banishment for offending a eunuch in 1506. However, his professional career resumed when he became the Governor of Jiangxi.

=== Military exploits ===
Wang became a successful general and was known for the strict discipline he imposed on his troops. In 1517 and 1518, he was dispatched in response to petitions to suppress peasant revolts in Jiangxi, Fujian and Guangdong. Concerned with the destruction that came with war, he petitioned the court to allow amnesty, and successfully destroyed rebel military forces.

==== Suppressing the Prince of Ning rebellion ====
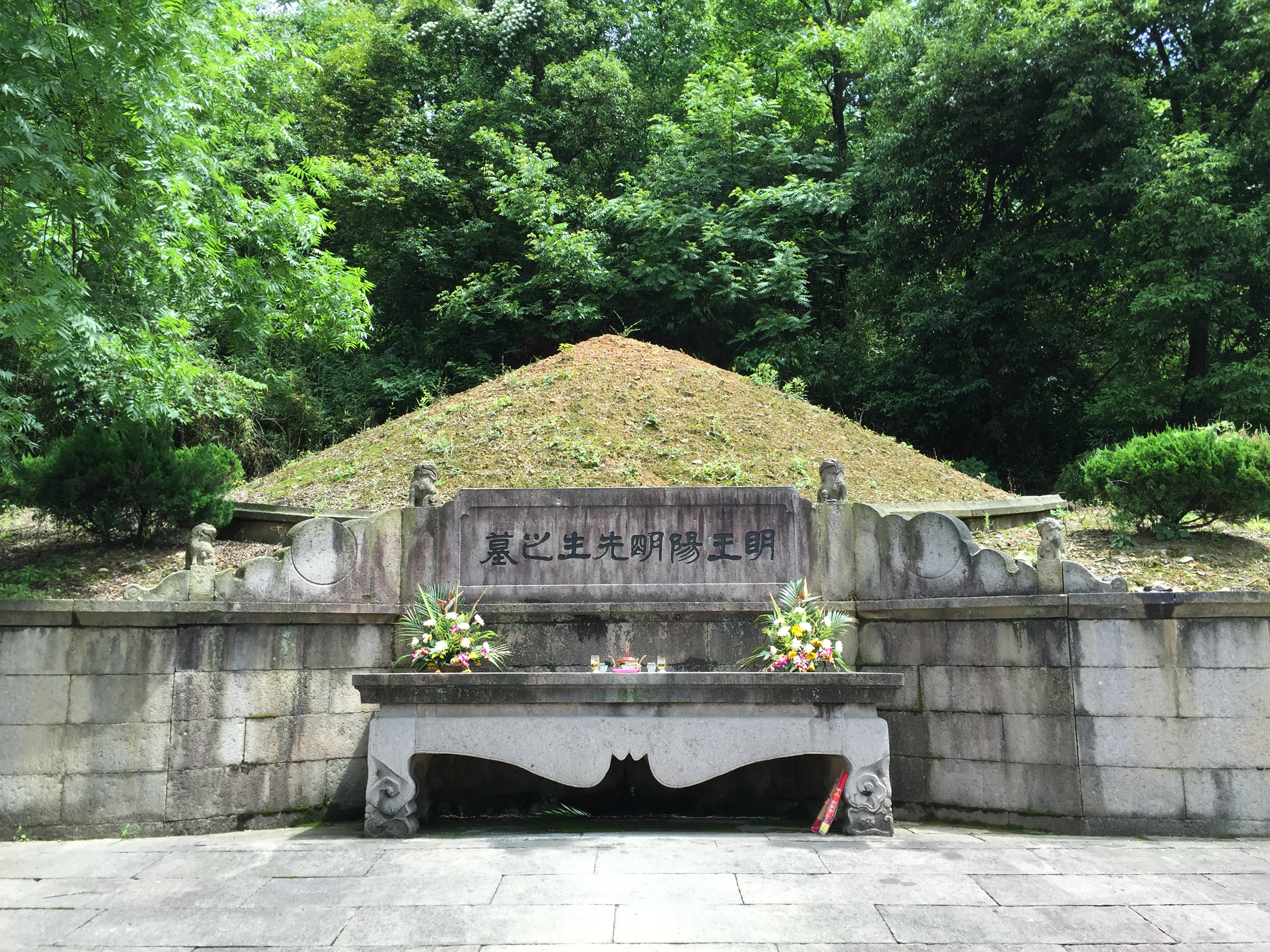
Tomb of Wang Yangming at Shaoxing

In 1519 AD, while he was governor of Jiangxi province and on his way to suppress the revolts in Fujian, Wang was suddenly faced with the Prince of Ning rebellion, led by Zhu Chenhao the fourth Prince of Ning. Given that the prince's base in Nanchang allowed him to sail down the Yangtze River and capture the southern capital of Nanjing, Wang actively prepared for battle to prevent that possibility, while engaging in deception to convince the prince that armies were moving to surround him. The prince, deceived by this, hesitated and gave time for Nanjing to be reinforced. Eventually, forced to engage governmental forces, the Prince of Ning was defeated and captured.

In this campaign, Wang also made one of the earliest references to using the fo-lang-ji in battle, a breech loading culverin cannon imported from the newly arrived Portuguese venturers to China. As governor of Jiangxi he also built schools, rehabilitated the rebels, and reconstructed what was lost by the enemy during the revolt. Though he was made an earl, he was ostracized for opposing Zhu Xi.

Thirty-eight years after his death, he was given the titles Marquis and Completion of Culture. In 1584 he was offered sacrifice in the Confucian Temple, the highest honour for a scholar.

== Philosophy ==
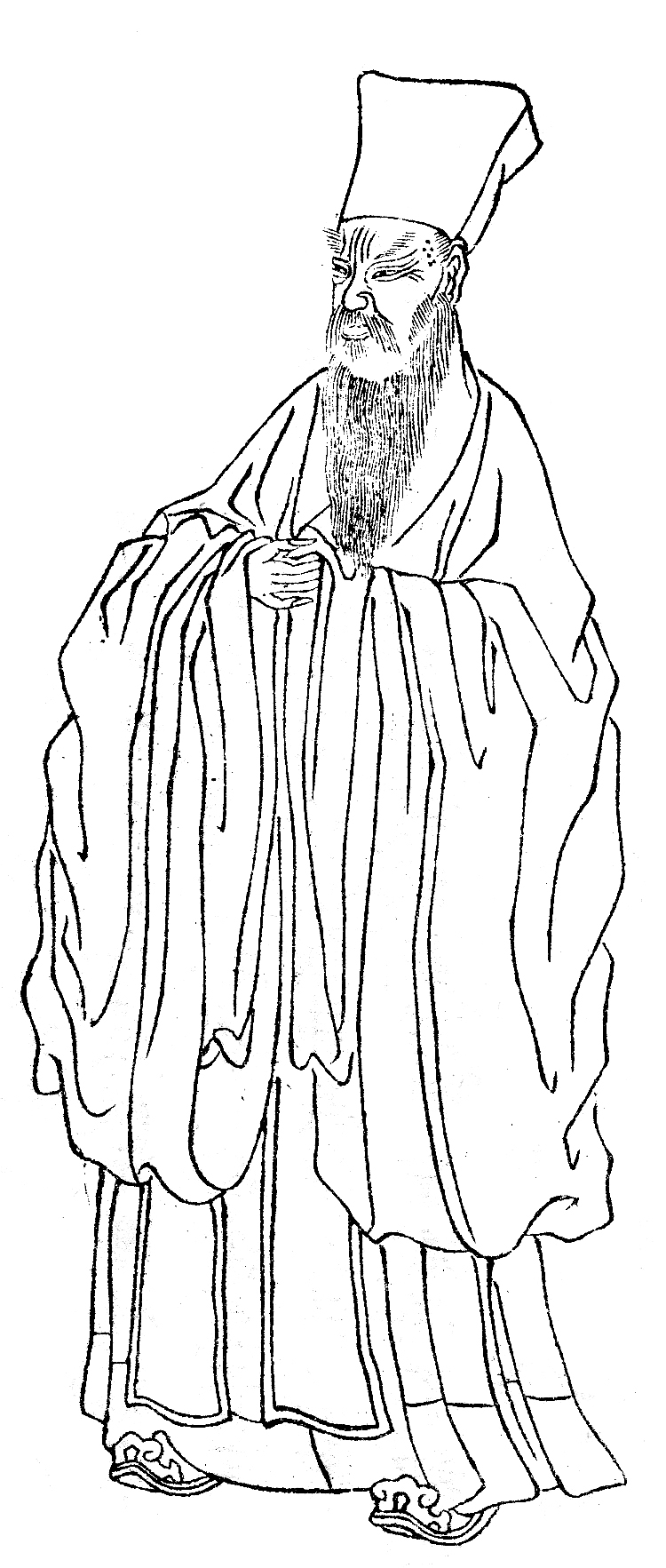
Wang Yangming

Wang was the leading figure in the Neo-Confucian School of heart, founded by Lu Jiuyuan (陸九淵, or Lu Xiangshan) of the Southern Song. This school championed an interpretation of Mencius, a Classical Confucian who became the focus of later interpretation, that unified knowledge with action. Their rival school, the School of Principle (Li) treated gaining knowledge as a kind of preparation or cultivation that, when completed, could guide action.

=== Innate knowing ===
Out of Cheng-Zhu's Neo-Confucianism that was mainstream at the time, Wang Yangming developed the idea of innate knowing, arguing that every person knows from birth the difference between good and evil. Wang claimed that such knowledge is intuitive and not rational. These revolutionizing ideas of Wang Yangming would later inspire prominent Japanese thinkers like Motoori Norinaga, who argued that because of the Shinto deities, Japanese people alone had the intuitive ability to distinguish good and evil without complex rationalization. His school of thought (Ōyōmei-gaku in Japanese, Ō stands for the surname "Wang", yōmei stands for "Yangming", gaku stands for "school of learning") also greatly influenced the Japanese samurai ethic.

=== Integration of Knowledge and Action ===
Wang's rejection of the pure investigation of knowledge comes from the then traditional view of Chinese belief that once one gained knowledge, one had a duty to put that knowledge into action. This presupposed two possibilities: That one can have knowledge without/prior to corresponding action or that one can know what is the proper action, but still fail to act.

Wang rejected both of these which allowed him to develop his philosophy of action. Wang believed that only through spontaneous action could one gain knowledge and denied all other ways of gaining it. To him, there was no way to use knowledge after gaining it because he believed that knowledge and action were unified as one. Any knowledge that had been gained then put into action was considered delusion or false.

=== Mind and the world ===
He held that objects do not exist entirely apart from the mind because the mind shapes them. He believed that it is not the world that shapes the mind, but the mind that gives reason to the world. Therefore, the mind alone is the source of all reason. He understood this to be an inner light, an innate moral goodness and understanding of what is good.

In order to eliminate selfish desires that cloud the mind's understanding of goodness, one can practice his type of meditation often called "tranquil repose" or "sitting still" (靜坐 jingzuo). This is similar to the practice of Chan (Zen) meditation in Buddhism.

== Influence ==
Wang Yangming is regarded one of the greatest masters of Confucianism in history along with Confucius, Mencius and Zhu Xi (孔孟朱王). He founded "Yaojiang School" (姚江學派) or "Yangming School of Mind" (陽明心學), which became one of the dominant Confucian schools in the mid-late Ming period and Qing period China. The typical figures came from this school after Wang were Wang Ji (王龍溪), Qian Dehong (錢德洪), Wang Gen, Huang Zongxi, Li Zhuowu and Liu Zongzhou (劉宗周). Wang Gen formed Taizhou School (泰州學派), which went left of Wang Yangming's thought. During the late Ming period, Wang Yangming's thought became notably popular and influential in China. Wang's interpretation of Confucianism has been influential in China into modern times. The twentieth-century Chinese warlord Yan Xishan attempted to revive Confucianism in Shanxi largely on the model of Wang's philosophy. The teachings of Wang Yangming were credited with inspiring many Japanese reformers and revolutionaries during the nineteenth century. This led to a great increase in interest in his thought in Japan at the end of the Meiji period, when many Chinese activists such as Liang Qichao and Chiang Kai-shek were staying in Japan. Some Chinese and Korean thinkers believed that Wang Yangming's teachings strongly influenced the development of modern bushido (the "way of the warrior") in Japan, and promoted both ethics in their countries to strengthen the spirit of their respective peoples.

The Japanese Admiral of the Russo-Japanese War, Tōgō Heihachirō, was influenced by Wang, and made a stamp which read, "One's whole life followed the example of Yangming" (Japanese: 一生低首拜陽明). In Japan, many scholars and politicians (this group of people is known in Japanese as "Yōmeigakusha" (Japanese: 陽明学者) came from Wang Yangming's school (Ōyōmei-gaku) in history, including Kumazawa Banzan, Saigō Takamori, Takasugi Shinsaku and Nakae Tōju. Toju Nakae is regarded as the founder of Japanese Ōyōmei-gaku.

General Secretary of the Chinese Communist Party Xi Jinping urges the party and government officials to learn from Wang's credo "the unity of thought and action".

== Memorials ==
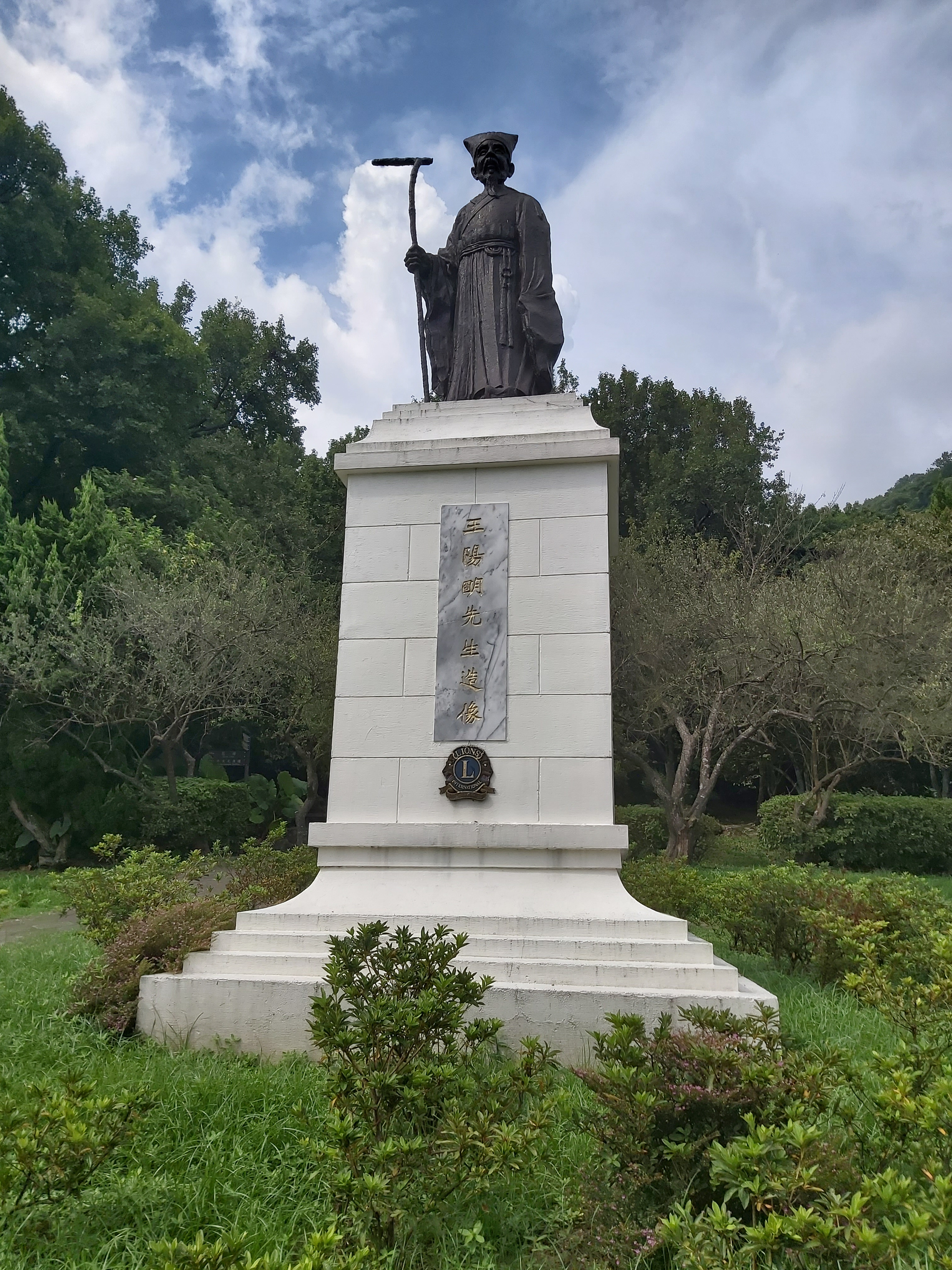
Statue of Wang Yangming at Yangmingshan, Taipei.

Chiang Kai-shek named a national attraction in Taiwan, Yangmingshan, after Wang; and a road in Nanchang is also named Yangming Road after Wang by Chiang-influenced local officials. Additionally, National Yang-Ming University in Taiwan is also named after the philosopher. People in Guiyang, provincial capital of Guizhou Province, dedicated a statue to Wang Yangming as well as a museum and theme park; a robot version of Wang Yangming is in the city. The city government in Wang's hometown, Yuyao, Zhejiang Province, named a middle school after his honorific name.

== Translations ==
- Henke, Frederick (1916). The philosophy of Wang Yang-ming. London: Open Court.. Public domain. Considered a poor translation by Chan.
- Ching, Julia (1972). The Philosophical Letters of Wang Yang-ming. Canberra, Australia: Australian National University Press. Sixty-seven letters and annotations.
- Chan, Wing-tsit (1963). A Source Book in Chinese Philosophy. Princeton, NJ: Princeton University Press. Excerpts only.
- Chan, Wing-tsit (1963). Instructions For Practical Living and Other Neo-Confucian Writings by Wang Yang-Ming. Columbia University Press. Full translation of 傳習録 and 大學問, Wang's two major works.
- Ivanhoe, Philip (2009). Readings from the Lu-Wang school of Neo-Confucianism. Indianapolis: Hackett Pub. Co. ISBN 978-0872209602. Excerpts, but including the first translations of some of Wang's letters.
