= Lu Jiuyuan =

Chinese scholar

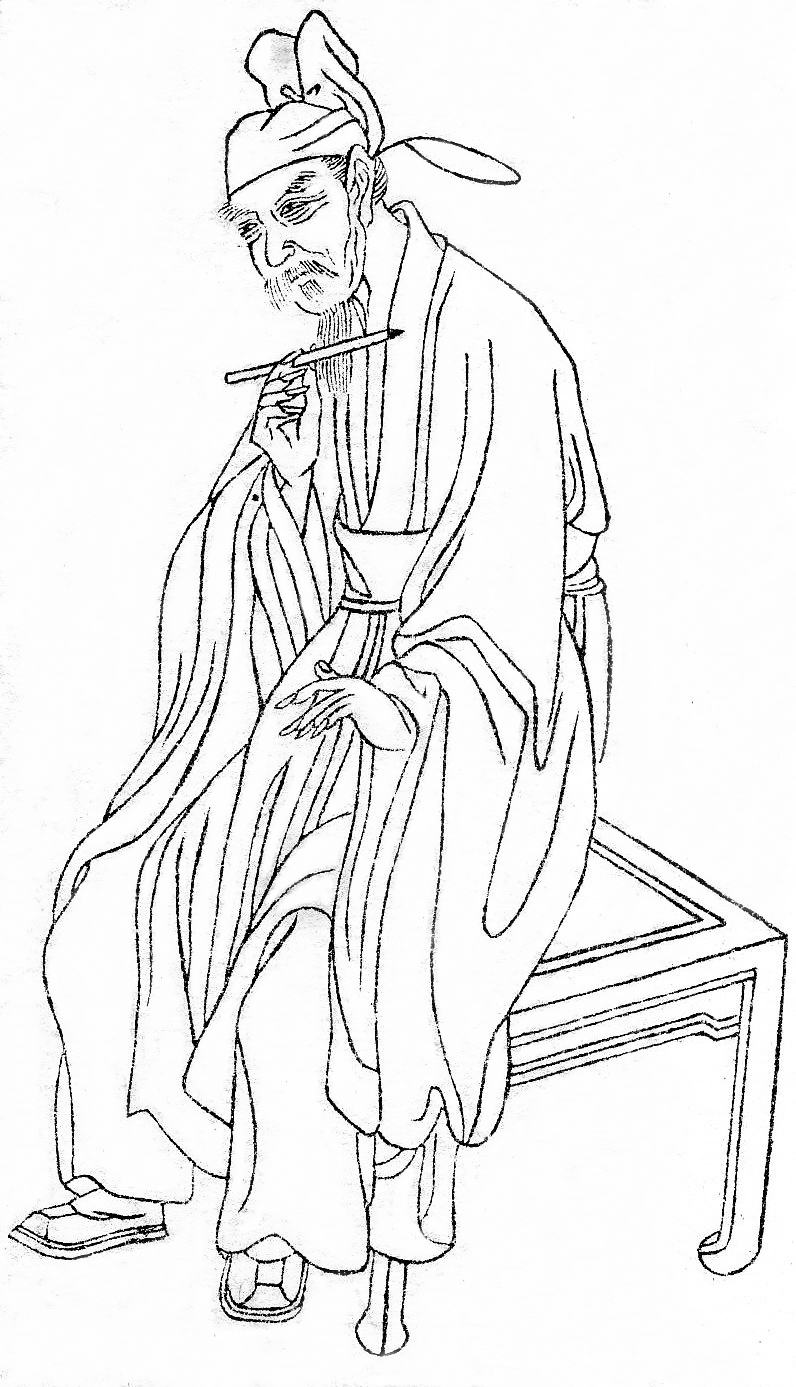
- Lu Jiuyuan
- Born: 1139
- Died: 1192 (aged 52–53)

Lu Jiuyuan (Chinese: 陸九淵; pinyin: Lù Jiǔyuān; 1139–1192), or Lu Xiangshan (陸象山; Lù Xiàngshān), was a Chinese philosopher and writer who founded the school of the universal mind, the second most influential Neo-Confucian school. He was a contemporary and the main rival of Zhu Xi.

In East Asia and the Western World, he is known by his honorific name rather than his private name.

== Lu Jiuyuan's main ideas ==
=== Lu's Philosophy of the Mind: Unity of the Mind and the Way ===
In his own words, Lu said, "The universe is my mind, and my mind is the universe." Unlike Zhu's emphasis of li, which is the principle that contains and underlies all things and beings, Lu brought forward the concept of the heart/mind as the ultimate one or source that encompasses everything including the universe and the principle. The unity of the mind expressed in the work of Lu means that the mind of humanity and the mind of the Way (Dao) are one and the same. This is in direct opposition to Zhu Xi's idea that the mind of Humanity and the mind of the Way are separate and distinct from each other. Zhu Xi also claimed that every individual thing possesses its own unique material force (qi) distinct from the principle (li). Lu vehemently opposed this dualistic doctrine and further emphasized that everything is connected and originated from the heart/mind.

=== Original Mind ===
The concept of original mind was first conceived by Mencius but was further developed by Lu. The original mind means that all human beings are born with innate moral knowledge and virtue. This original mind is fourfold as Mencius called them 'four roots of the heart':

- Compassion - The root of humaneness (ren).
- Shame - The root of righteousness (yi).
- Respect - The root of propriety and ritual observance (li).
- Knowledge of right and wrong - The root of wisdom (zhi).

Like real roots in nature these four roots must be nurtured first before flowers to bloom. So, in other words, these four roots of the heart are nothing but just tendencies of the mind. These four roots of the heart need proper nurturing and care to grow strong and healthy to manifest their true nature, which is moral virtue.

Lu believed that moral virtues are innately present in the human heart/mind and that, endowed by Heaven, humaneness and righteousness form the Original Mind of human beings. The original mind is shared by all human beings, both sages and common people, and its truth is ageless and eternal.

== Influence of Mencius on Lu's philosophy ==
Mencius undoubtedly had a major influence on Lu, this can easily be attested to by the numerous quotes of Mencius used in the works of Lu. Their similarities are striking since Lu used many concepts and ideas first conceived by Mencius; but without exception Lu developed Mencius' ideas on his own and caused these ideas to reach a greater maturation. Furthermore, influenced by both Buddhism and Daoism, Lu incorporates the metaphysical aspects to his philosophy that added more complexity and subtlety to Mencius' original ideas.

== Influence of Daoism on Lu Jiuyuan ==
There is a real and significant influence of Daoism on Lu's philosophy. The most prominent influences are the concept simplicity and spontaneity.

The concept of spontaneity is the central point of Daoism. According to Daoism, an ideal ruler is the king who has cultivated quiescence (stillness) to such a level that he can act harmoniously and spontaneously to any situation. Zhuangzi, Daoist philosopher, expresses this in his own words, "in stillness a sage, in motion a king".

Another influence of Daoism on Lu Jiuyuan in his belief that if one is 'to establish what is fundamental, one must eliminate desire.' This is to emphasize the simplicity of living without human desires that usually corrupt human beings' true simplistic nature.

== School of the Universal Mind after Lu Jiuyuan ==
The philosophy of Lu Jiuyuan attracted not many followers in China following Lu's death in 1193. Lu's philosophy was almost completely forgotten until a later thinker named Wang Yangming republished and wrote his commentaries on Lu's works during Ming dynasty. Wang Yangming played a significant role in developing and spreading Lu's philosophy and the school of the universal mind rivaling Zhuxi's school of the principle. The school of the universal mind is also called the Lu-Wang school after the names of two major thinkers, Lu Jiuyuan and Wang Yangming. The influence of this school in China following Wang's death was however curtailed by the strong centralized bureaucratic state system which controlled the education of all the government officials through the state sponsored examination which was heavily influenced by the curriculum designed by Zhu Xi. The influence of Lu-Wang school in Japan was however much greater owing to the comparatively more decentralized government system following the Sengoku (Warring states) period. The Oyomei (Japanese for Wang Yangming) school in Japan inspired and made great influences on subsequent Japanese thinkers and activists such as Nakae Tōju and Ōshio Heihachirō.

Lu's interpretation of Confucianism remained influential in China into the twentieth century. In the early twentieth century Lu's philosophy was re-popularized by Liang Shuming in his book The Civilization and Philosophy of the East and the West (1921). The Nationalist warlord Yan Xishan attempted to revive Confucianism in Shanxi largely on the model of the Lu-Wang school.

== See also ==
- Confucianism
- Mencius
- Neo-Confucianism
- Zhu Xi
- Wang Yangming
