= Yangmingism =

Neo-Confucianist philosophical school

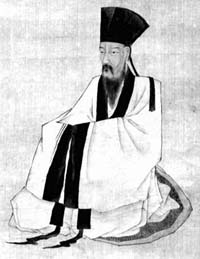
Portrayal of Wang Yangming

The School of Mind, or the School of Heart (Chinese: 心學; pinyin: xīn xué), or Yangmingism (Chinese: 陽明學; pinyin: yángmíng xué; Japanese: 陽明学, romanized: yōmeigaku), is one of the major philosophical schools of Neo-Confucianism, based on the ideas of the idealist Neo-Confucian philosopher Wang Shouren (whose pseudonym was Yangming Zi and who is thus often referred as Wang Yangming). Throughout the whole Yuan dynasty, as well as in the beginning of the Ming dynasty, the magistral philosophy in China was the Rationalistic School, another school of Neo-Confucianism emphasizing the importance of observational science built by Cheng Yi and especially Zhu Xi. Wang Yangming, on the other hand, developed his philosophy as the main intellectual opposition to the Cheng-Zhu School. Yangmingism is considered to be part of the School of Mind established by Lu Jiuyuan, upon whom Yangming drew inspirations. Yangming argued that one can learn the supreme principle (理, pinyin: Li) from their minds, objecting to Cheng and Zhu's belief that one can only seek the supreme principle in the objective world. Furthermore, Yangmingism posits a oneness of action and knowledge in relation to one's concepts of morality. This idea, "regard the inner knowledge and the exterior action as one" (知行合一) is the main tenet in Yangmingism.

It is sometimes called the Lu-Wang school by people who wish to emphasize the influence of Lu Jiuyuan. The Lu-Wang school (or Xinxue) was seen as a rival to the Cheng–Zhu school (or Lixue) school named after its leading philosophers, Cheng Yi and Zhu Xi.

Yangming's philosophy was inherited and spread by his disciples. Eventually, Yangmingism overtook the dominance of the Cheng-Zhu School and started to have followers outside China. Yangmingism became an influence on the incipient anti-foreigner movement in 19th century Japan. In the 20th century, Japanese author and nationalist Yukio Mishima examined Yangmingism as an integral part of the ideologies behind the Meiji Restoration as well as further samurai resistance, in particular the Shinpūren rebellion.

Some have described it as influential as the Cultural Revolution for its idea of internal transformation.

== Origins ==
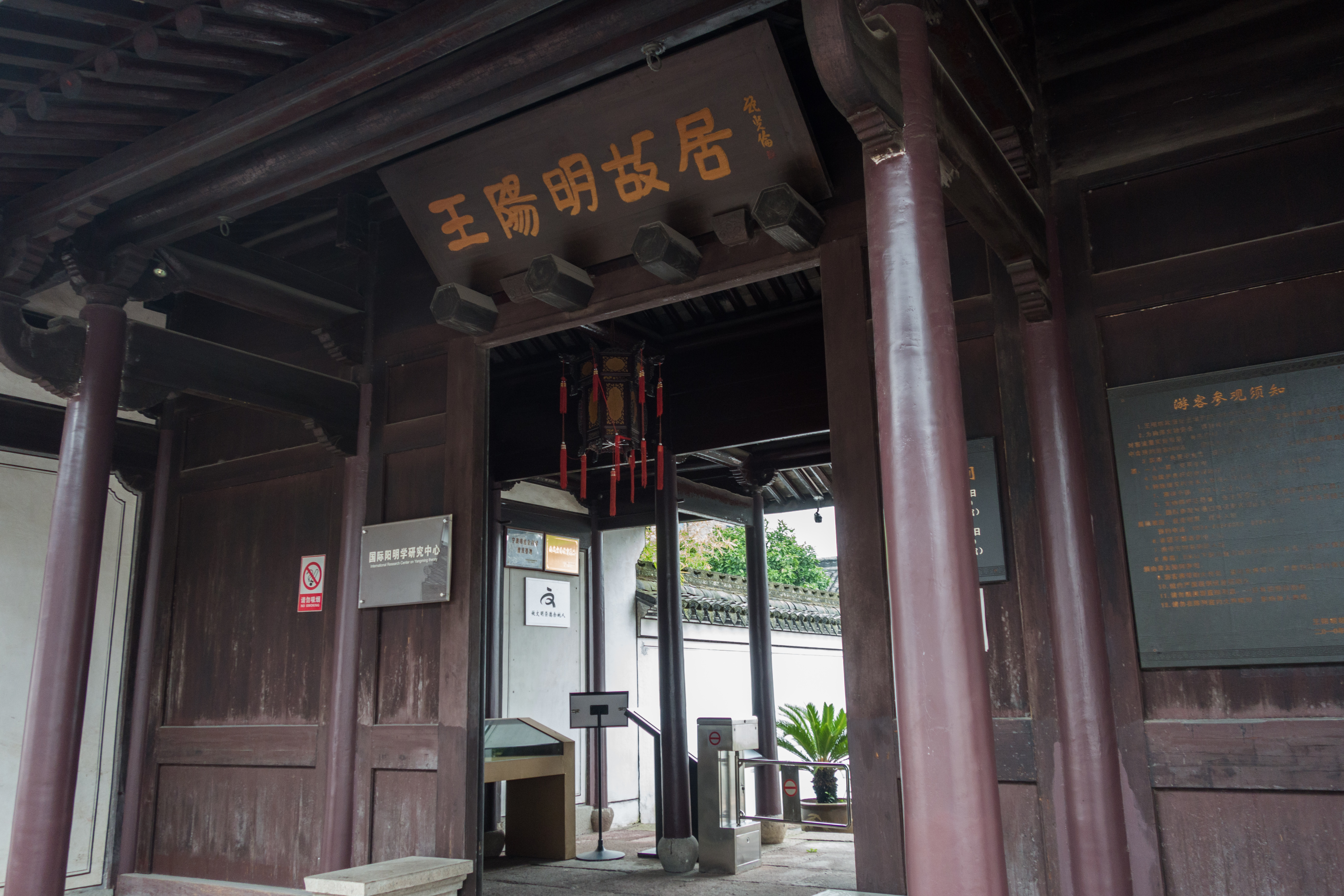
Former residence of Wang Yangming

In 1472, Yangming was born in a rich household in Yuyao, Zhejiang. Yangming's father ranked first place in the imperial examination in 1481, thus he had been expecting his children to inherit his knowledge and start their career by participating in the imperial examination.

When Yangming was 12 years old, Yangming's father sent him to a private school to prepare for the exam. At the age of eighteen, Yangming had a talk with Lou Liang, who was one of the representative figures of Cheng-Zhu School at that time. Lou's teachings had significantly enhanced Yangming's interest in Cheng-Zhu School. After their conversations, Yangming managed to read through all of Zhu's work, reflecting on Cheng-Zhu School's principle that "to acquire knowledge one must study things" (格物致知). To practice this principle, Yangming spent seven days doing nothing except staring at, or so to say, studying the bamboos planted in the garden.

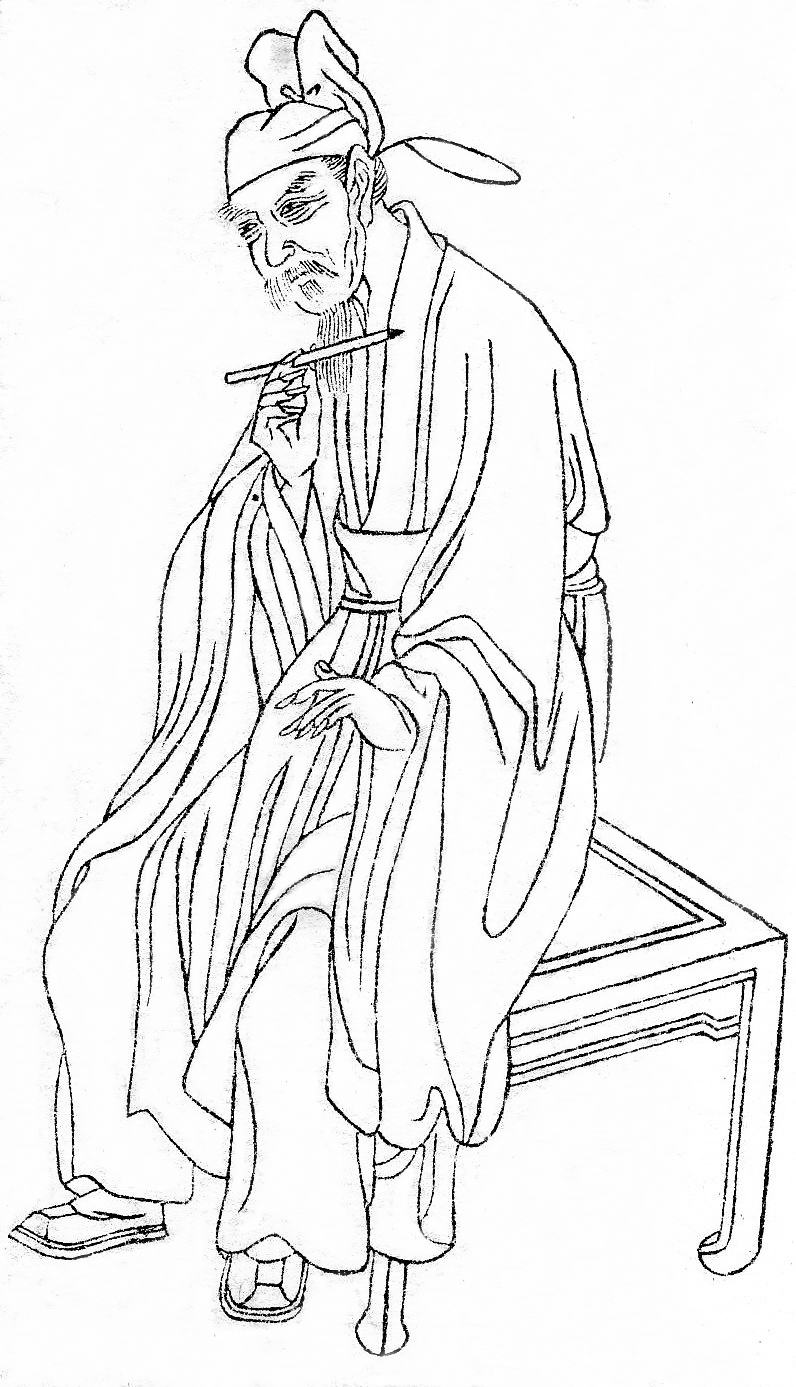
Lu Jiuyuan

Not surprisingly, not only did he not learn anything from the bamboos, but Yangming also fell seriously ill after sitting in the garden for seven days. Therefore, Yangming had given up on most of the Cheng-Zhu literature, as well as the idea of taking the imperial examination. Instead, he began to read texts written by other Chinese philosophers, and eventually narrowed his focus on Taoism and Lu Jiuyuan, whose work had been a major opponent to the Cheng-Zhu's Rationalistic School.

Though Yangming had lost his faith in the imperial examination, he still signed up for the exam for the sake of his father. He passed the exam and was later assigned to work in the construction department in the central government. In 1506, Yangming was caught in political conflicts, and soon was demoted to Guizhou, the most deserted place in China at that time. Yangming soon recovered from the setback. While working on improving the living situations of people in Guizhou, Yangming developed his own philosophical principles, which were then called Yangminism, based on The Great Learning and Lu's work.

Yangmingism became hugely popular in Southern China, especially Jiangxi and Jiangnan (except Suzhou), but not Anhui and Fujian, and by the sixteenth century the Cheng-Zhu orthodox school even in the North could not ignore its basic philosophical claims. The Yangmingist belief that all men were equally capable of moral behaviour led them to advocate the formation of jiangxue study communities and that participating in the state was not necessary, which in turn led to rise of the Donglin movement. Northern literati, more dependent on governmental routes to success than their Southern counterparts, were less receptive to Yangmingism.

== Major philosophy principles ==
=== "The Supreme Principle is Buried in One's Heart-Mind" ===
Yangming inherits Lu Jiuyuan's idea that everything one needs can be found in one's heart, opposing to Cheng-Zhu's idea that one must learn from the external things. This was promoted with the adage "The Supreme Principle is Buried in One's Mind" (不離日用常行内，直到先天未畫時).

Yangming argues that there are countless matters existing in the world, we can never get to study all of, or even most of them. However, when we are interacting with the world, we are using our consciousness to look, smell, and hear what is all around us. Thus, we can find the existence of the whole world in our minds. If we think deeper, we can even see the extensions of the world there. The recognition of extensions here doesn't mean that one can see the whole picture of the Eiffel Tower even if he has never been to Paris. What Yangming has been trying to prove is that, as we have a completed set of perceptions of the world in our minds, we have as well gotten a hold of the ultimate philosophy, the truth of the world, the supreme principles which have been guiding and teaching us through the ages.

=== Achieve the ultimate consciousness ===
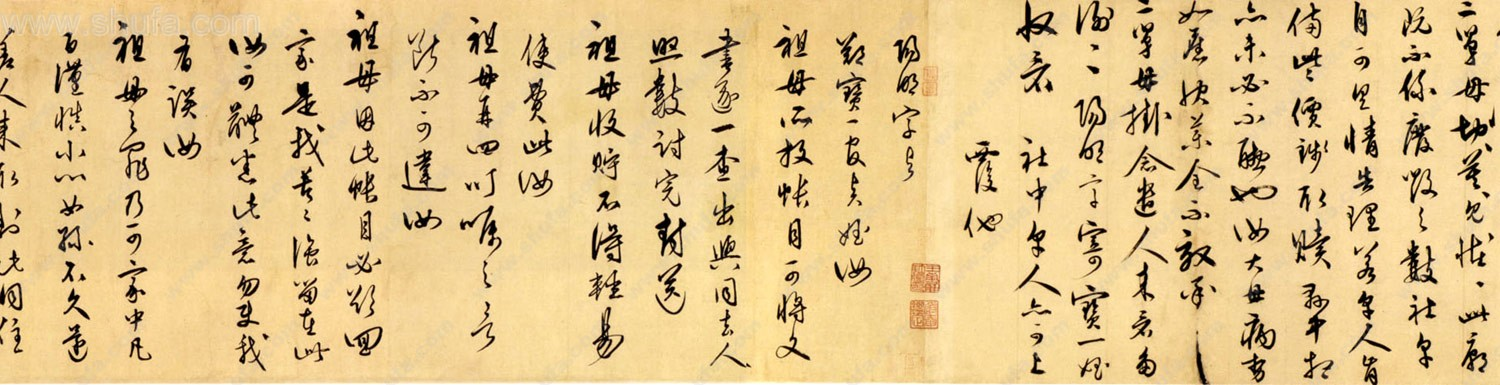
Yangming's handwriting

In his book, 傳習錄, or Instructions for Practical Living and Other Neo-Confucian Writings in English, Yangming writes that "there is nothing exists outside our minds, there is no supreme principle exists outside our hearts." However, the problem here is that we let all kinds of selfish desires cover up the supreme principle, so we can't practice the principle well in our daily lives. Yangming uses an example in his book to demonstrate his idea: if we see a child fall into water well, we can't help but feel bad for the child. The feeling of bad here is an embodiment of the inherent supreme principle in our minds. But, if the child happens to be the son of one's biggest enemy, he may not feel bad for the child after all. This is the situation in which the supreme principle is covered by selfish desires. If one can remove all selfish desires from one's heart, then he would achieve the ultimate consciousness, which is the final purpose pursued by many Chinese philosophers throughout centuries.

One thing worth noticing here is that, the ultimate consciousness is also in accordance with Cheng-Zhu's "to acquire knowledge one must study things (格物致知)" in a way. This means that one must conduct appropriate behaviors under certain circumstances. For instance, everyone knows they should care about their families' wellbeing. But if one only asks whether his families are feeling good or bad and does nothing when he receives the answer "feeling bad", this cannot count as the ultimate consciousness. Only does one actually do things to take care of his families can be considered as knowing the ultimate consciousness.

=== The unity of inner knowledge and action ===
The unity of inner knowledge and action, or "知行合一", is probably the most important and well-known concept in Yangmingism. Yangming explains this concept as "Nobody can separate the knowledge and the action apart. If one knows, one will act. If one knows but doesn't act, then he has never actually known it. If you can obtain both, when you know something, you are already doing it; when you are doing something, then you already know it."

"Nowadays, many people treat knowledge and action as two distinct things. They think they need to know first, only then can they do something in this area. This leads them to do nothing, as well as to know nothing."

In other words, 知行合一 could be interpreted as the consistency of one's Supreme Principle and his objective actions. In the example of a child falling into a water well, the action is not trying to save the child, but "feeling bad for the child". And the knowledge, the part of the Supreme Principle used here is the sympathy for others. For those who don't feel bad for the child, they haven't learned the knowledge of sympathy yet, thus they cannot apply the knowledge in their actions.

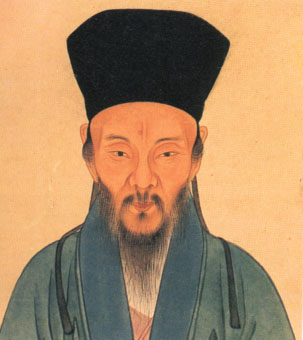
Wang Yangming

Similar ideas can be found in Western literature. In Demian, Hermann Hesse writes that "only the thoughts that we live out have any value." MIT's motto "Mens et Manus," or "Mind and Hand," also reflects the importance of combining inner knowledge and actions as one.

=== The Four-Sentence Teaching ===
In 1528, one year before his death, Yangming summarizes his philosophies into a doctrine called "the Four-Sentence Teaching (四句教)". The original Chinese text is "無善無惡心之體，有善有惡意之動；知善知惡是良知，為善去惡是格物". which can be translated as "There is no good or evil in the substance of the Heart. There is good or evil in the motion of the Mind. Knowing good and evil forms the essence of Knowledge. Doing good and eliminating evil guide men in ordering Things."

=== Education philosophies ===
Yangming regards education as the most efficient way to inspire people to find the Supreme Principle in their minds; it means that not only do education institutions need to teach students academic knowledge, but they also need to teach students moral and ethical principles. He again emphasized the necessity of uniting knowledge and actions as one in the process of education. Yangming believed that in order to achieve something, one must set up a specific goal first.

== Genres ==
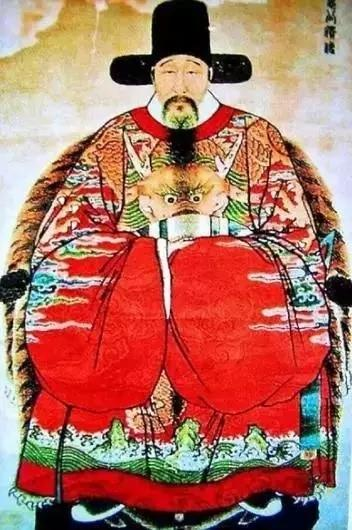
Zhang Juzheng, one of the greatest Chinese politicians.

=== Left philosophical genre ===
==== Zhezhong School ====
Notable figures in this genre include Nie Bao, Zou Shouyi, Xu Jie, and Zhang Juzheng. Zhezhong School emphasizes on inner virtues. Scholars in this school regard virtues and knowledge are the foundation of one's life, arguing that one should solely focus on learning instead of actively seeking fames or reputations. They emphasize the importance of education.

=== Right philosophical genre ===
==== Taizhou School ====
Notable figures include He Xinyin, Yan Shannong, and Wang Gen. Taizhou School became widespread because it focuses on the general public. Scholars in Taizhou School believe that even the most ordinary person has the possibility of accomplishing extraordinary achievements. Everyone is a potential saint, as the universal truth is buried their own mind. Taizhou School is rebellious against both the traditional and the Neo-Confucianism.

== Critics ==
Chinese historian and philosopher, Wang Fuzhi, criticized that Yangming is more of a Buddhism follower than a Neo-Confucianism philosopher. Yangming's excessive concentration on minds had made his teaching contain a negative attitude coming from his early education in Buddhism. Fuzhi didn't agree with Yangming that there is no good or bad exist in both the world and people's minds. He also argued that 知行合一, the unity of inner knowledge and actions had made people no longer able to separate theories and actual matter apart.

== In Japan ==
Yangmingism was spread to Japan in the latter part of the Ming Dynasty by a traveling Japanese monk. From 1568 to 1603, Yangmingism was at its preliminary stage in Japan. Later, when the Ming Dynasty ended, some of the Ming scholars fled to Japan and helped to develop Yangmingism there. In 1789, Yangmingism became an influential philosophy among the Japanese, and played an essential role in the Meiji Restoration.

== See also ==
- Kokutai
- Ukehi
