= Mencius =

Confucian philosopher (c. 371 – c. 289 BC)

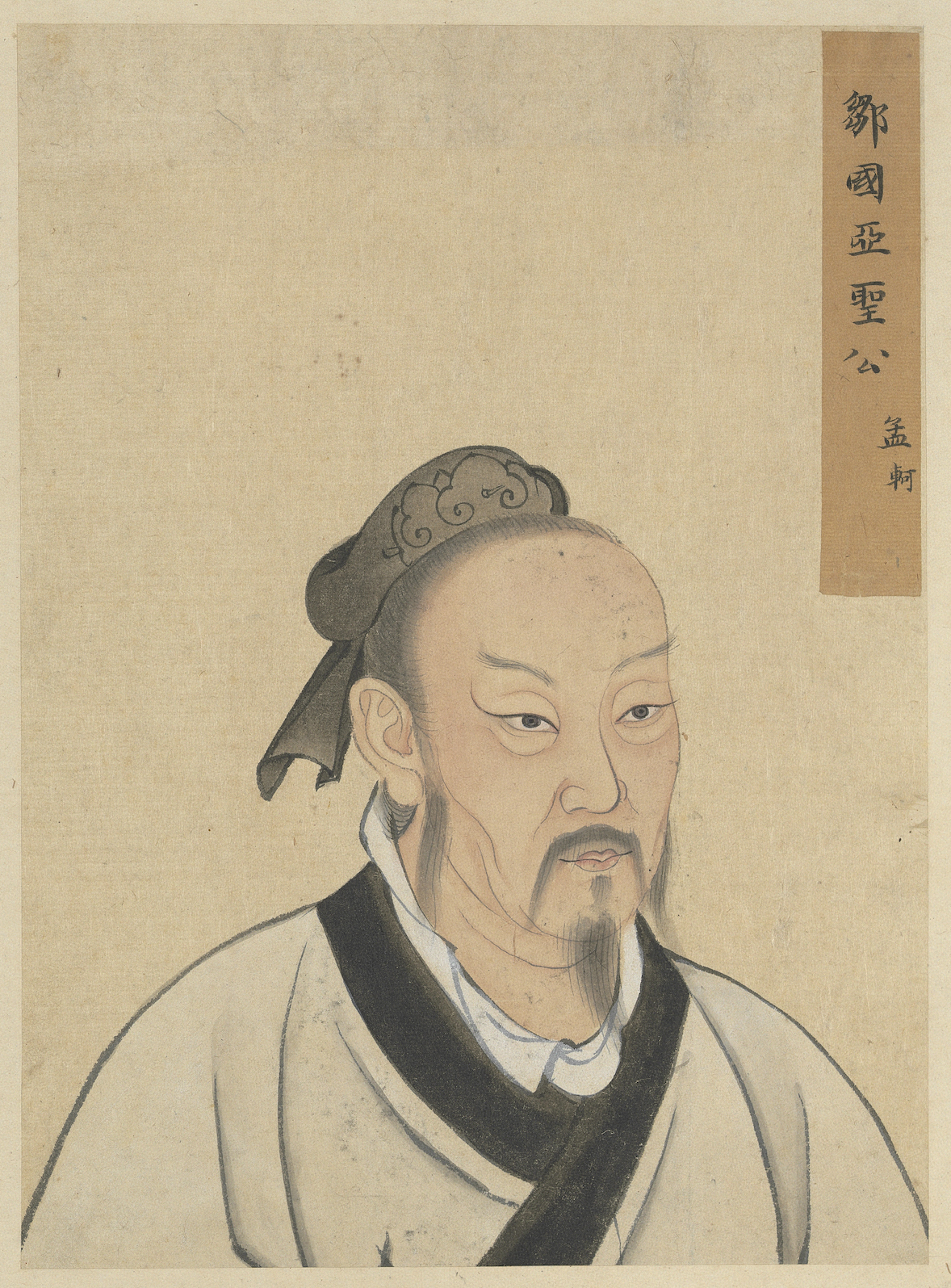
- As depicted in the album Half Portraits of the Great Sage and Virtuous Men of Old (至聖先賢半身像) – held by the National Palace Museum in Taipei
- Born: Meng Ke c. 371 BC; Zou, Zhou dynasty (modern Zoucheng, Shandong)
- Died: c. 289 BC; Zou, Zhou dynasty

Philosophical work
- Era: Ancient philosophy
- Region: Chinese philosophy
- School: Confucianism
- Main interests: Ethics, social philosophy, political philosophy
- Notable ideas: Right to revolution as an aspect of the Mandate of Heaven; Goodness of human nature

Chinese name
- Chinese: 孟子
- Literal meaning: "Master Meng"
Transcriptions
Standard Mandarin
- Hanyu Pinyin: Mèngzǐ
- Bopomofo: ㄇㄥˋ ㄗˇ
- Wade–Giles: Mêng^{4}-tzŭ^{3}
- IPA: [mə̂ŋ.tsɨ̀]
Wu
- Romanization: Man-tsy
Yue: Cantonese
- Yale Romanization: Maahngjí
- Jyutping: maang6 zi2
- IPA: [maŋ˨.tsi˧˥]
Southern Min
- Hokkien POJ: Bēng-chú
- Tâi-lô: Bīng-tsú
Middle Chinese
- Middle Chinese: Mæ̀ng-tzí
Old Chinese
- Baxter–Sagart (2014): *mˤraŋ-s tsəʔ

Birth name
- Chinese: 孟軻
Transcriptions
Standard Mandarin
- Hanyu Pinyin: Mèng Kē
- Bopomofo: ㄇㄥˋ ㄎㄜ
- Wade–Giles: Mêng^{4} K‘o^{1}
- IPA: [mə̂ŋ kʰɤ́]
Yue: Cantonese
- Yale Romanization: Maahng Ō
- Jyutping: maang6 o1
- IPA: [maŋ˨ ɔ˥]
Southern Min
- Hokkien POJ: Bēng Kho

Korean name
- Hangul: 맹자
- Hanja: 孟子
Transcriptions
- Revised Romanization: Maengja
- McCune–Reischauer: Maengja

Japanese name
- Kanji: 孟子
- Kana: もうし
Transcriptions
- Romanization: Mōshi

Mencius (孟子, Mèngzǐ, MEN-shee-əs; c. 371 – c. 289 BC), born Meng Ke (孟軻), was a Chinese Confucian philosopher, often described as the Second Sage (亞聖) to reflect his traditional esteem relative to Confucius himself. He was part of Confucius's fourth generation of disciples, inheriting his ideology and developing it further. Living during the Warring States period, he is said to have spent much of his life travelling around the states offering counsel to different rulers. Conversations with these rulers form the basis of the Mencius, which would later be canonised as a Confucian classic.

One primary principle of his work is that human nature is righteous and humane. The responses of citizens to the policies of rulers embodies this principle, and a state with righteous and humane policies will flourish by nature. The citizens, if they enjoy freedom under good rulers, will willingly take the time to care for their families, learn to perform proper rites, and become better citizens. This placed him at odds with his near contemporary, Xunzi, who believed that human nature is evil.

== Life ==
Mencius was born Meng Ke in the state of Zou, in what is now Zoucheng, Shandong. He was an itinerant philosopher and sage, and one of the principal interpreters of Confucianism. He was supposedly a pupil of Confucius's grandson Zisi (c. 481 – c. 402 BC). Like Confucius, according to legend, he travelled throughout China for forty years to offer advice to rulers for reform. During the Warring States period (c. 475 – 221 BC), Mencius served as an official and scholar at the Jixia Academy in the state of Qi from 319 to 312 BC. He expressed his filial piety when he took three years leave of absence from his official duties for Qi to mourn his mother's death. Disappointed at his failure to effect changes in his contemporary world, he retired from public life.

It is written in Fengsu Tongyi by Ying Shao that King Hui of Liang appointed Mencius as a high official at some point after the capital of Wei was moved from Anyi to Daliang.

Mencius was buried in the Cemetery of Mencius (孟子林; Mèngzi lín), located 12 km (7.5 mi) to the northeast of Zoucheng's central urban area. A stele carried by a giant stone tortoise and crowned with dragons stands in front of his grave.

=== Mother ===
Mencius's father, Meng Ji (孟激), died when Mencius was very young. Mencius's mother, Meng Mu (孟母; 'Mother of Meng'), born Zhang (仉), is often held up as an exemplary female figure in Chinese culture. She is one of 125 women of which biographies have been included in the Biographies of Exemplary Women, written by Liu Xiang. Xiang wrote four stories about Meng Mu.

==== Mencius' mother moves three times ====
The first story that Xiang notes is centred around the traditional chengyu 孟母三遷 (mèngmǔ sānqiān; 'Mencius's mother moves three times'). This saying refers to the story that Mencius's mother moved houses three times before finding a location that she felt was suitable for the child's upbringing.

The story begins with Meng Mu and Mencius living by a cemetery, where Meng Mu found her son 'eager to bury the dead'. Therefore, Meng Mu decided to move. Next she moved near a market. There Mencius began to imitate businesspersons. So Meng Mu moved to a house next to a school. Inspired by the scholars and students, Mencius began to study. His mother decided to remain, and Mencius became a scholar.

As an expression, the idiom refers to the importance of finding the proper environment for raising children.

==== Mencius' mother cuts her weaving ====
Xiang then mentions the story of Meng Mu duan zhi (孟母断织，Mencius' mother cuts her weaving). This story further illustrates the emphasis that Mencius's mother placed on her son's education. As the story goes, once when Mencius was young, he was a truant. His mother responded to his apparent disregard for his education by taking up a pair of scissors and cutting the cloth she had been weaving in front of him. This was intended to illustrate that one cannot stop a task midway, and her example inspired Mencius to be diligent in his studies.

==== Mencius intends to divorce his wife ====
There is another legend about his mother and his wife, involving a time when his wife was at home alone and was discovered by Mencius not to be sitting properly. Mencius thought his wife had violated a rite, and demanded a divorce. His mother claimed that it was written in The Book of Rites that before a person entered a room, he should announce his imminent presence loudly to let others prepare for his arrival; as he had not done that in this case, the person who had violated the rite was Mencius himself. Eventually Mencius admitted his fault.

== Key ideas ==
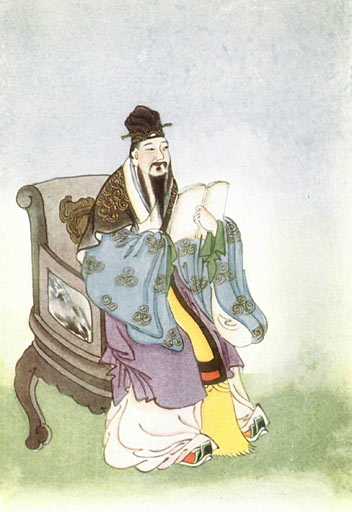
Mencius, from Myths and Legends of China (1922) by E. T. C. Werner

=== Human nature ===
Mencius expounds on the concept that the human is naturally righteous and humane. It is the influence of society that causes bad moral character. Mencius describes this in the context of educating rulers and citizens about the nature of man. "He who exerts his mind to the utmost knows his nature" and "the way of learning is none other than finding the lost mind."

=== The four beginnings ===
To show innate goodness, Mencius used the example of a child falling down a well.

Witnesses of this event immediately feel alarm and distress, not to gain friendship with the child's parents, nor to seek the praise of their neighbors and friends, nor because they dislike the reputation [of lack of humanity if they did not rescue the child]...

The feeling of commiseration definitely is the beginning of humanity; the feeling of shame and dislike is the beginning of righteousness; the feeling of deference and compliance is the beginning of propriety; and the feeling of right or wrong is the beginning of wisdom.

Men have these Four Beginnings just as they have their four limbs. Having these Four Beginnings, but saying that they cannot develop them is to destroy themselves.

Human nature has an innate tendency towards goodness, but moral rightness cannot be instructed down to the last detail. This is why merely external controls always fail in improving society. True improvement results from educational cultivation in favorable environments. Likewise, bad environments tend to corrupt the human will. This, however, is not proof of innate evil because a clear thinking person would avoid causing harm to others. This position of Mencius puts him between Confucians such as Xunzi, who thought people were innately bad, and Taoists who believed humans did not need cultivation, they just needed to accept their innate, natural, and effortless goodness. The four beginnings/sprouts could grow and develop, or they could fail. In this way Mencius synthesized integral parts of Taoism into Confucianism. Individual effort was needed to cultivate oneself, but one's natural tendencies were good to begin with. The object of education is the cultivation of benevolence (ren).

=== Education ===
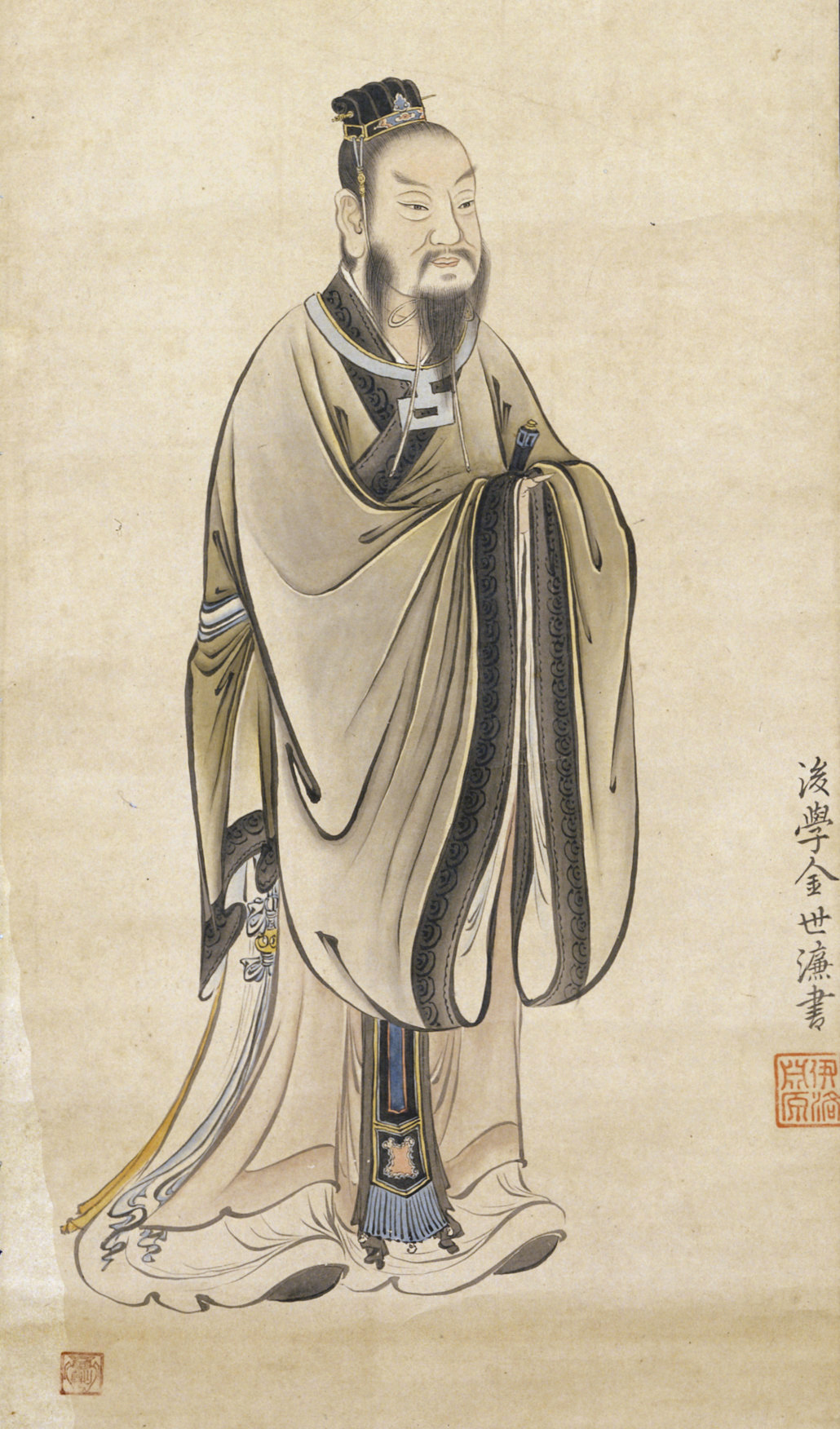
Painting of Mencius by Kanō Sansetsu (1632)

According to Mencius, education must awaken the innate abilities of the human mind. He denounced memorization and advocated active interrogation of the text, saying "One who believes all in the Book of Documents would be better off without the Book" (盡信書，則不如無書, from 孟子.盡心下). One should check for internal consistency by comparing sections and debate the probability of factual accounts by comparing them with experience.

=== Destiny ===
Mencius also believed in the power of Destiny in shaping the roles of human beings in society. What is destined cannot be contrived by the human intellect or foreseen. Destiny is shown when a path arises that is both unforeseen and constructive. Destiny should not be confused with Fate. Mencius denied that Heaven would protect a person regardless of his actions, saying, "One who understands Destiny will not stand beneath a tottering wall". The proper path is one which is natural and unforced. This path must also be maintained because, "Unused pathways are covered with weeds." One who follows Destiny will live a long and successful life. One who rebels against Destiny will die before his time.

=== Politics and economics ===
Mencius emphasized the significance of the common citizens in the state. While Confucianism generally regards rulers highly, he argued that it is acceptable for the subjects to overthrow or even kill a ruler who ignores the people's needs and rules harshly. This is because a ruler who does not rule justly is no longer a true ruler. Speaking of the overthrow of the wicked King Zhou of Shang, Mencius said, "I have merely heard of killing a villain Zhou, but I have not heard of murdering [him as] the ruler."

This saying should not be taken as an instigation to violence against authorities but as an application of Confucian philosophy to society. Confucianism requires a clarification of what may be reasonably expected in any given relationship. All relationships should be beneficial, but each has its own principle or inner logic. A ruler must justify his position by acting benevolently before he can expect reciprocation from the people. In this view, a king is like a steward. Although Confucius admired kings of great accomplishment, Mencius is clarifying the proper hierarchy of human society. Although a king has presumably higher status than a commoner, he is actually subordinate to the masses of people and the resources of society. Otherwise, there would be an implied disregard of the potential of human society heading into the future. One is significant only for what one gives, not for what one takes.

Mencius distinguished between superior men who recognize and follow the virtues of righteousness and benevolence and inferior men who do not. He suggested that superior men considered only righteousness, not benefits. That assumes "permanent property" to uphold common morality. To secure benefits for the disadvantaged and the aged, he advocated free trade, low tax rates, and a more equal sharing of the tax burden.

In regards to the Confucian perspective of the marketplace, more about Confucius' thoughts from Mencius than from the philosopher himself are learned. The government should have a mostly hands-off approach regarding the marketplace. This was in part, to prevent state-run monopolies, however, it was also the state's responsibility to protect against future monopolies that might come into existence. Mencius also advocated for no taxes on imports; the market was to exchange for what you lacked so taxing merchants importing goods would ultimately hurt the villagers. The thought behind this is that people are inherently good and rational and can be trusted to regulate themselves, so price gouging or deception would not be an issue. Taxes on the property were acceptable and to be the only means by which the dukes and states would collect money. They did not need to collect much because taxes were only for supplemental funds. These taxes were also progressive, meaning the families that owned larger, more fertile pieces of land would pay more than the families with uniform land allotments. Scarcity is an issue in any market; however, Mencius emphasizes the reframing of the idea of a scarce resource. Instead of scarce, resources are to be seen as abundant. Resources are gained through work ethic not by any other means so there are no unfair competitions or gains. To preserve these natural resources, they needed to be used or harvested according to their cycles of growth or replenishing. In many cases, posterity has priority over profit.

== Influence ==
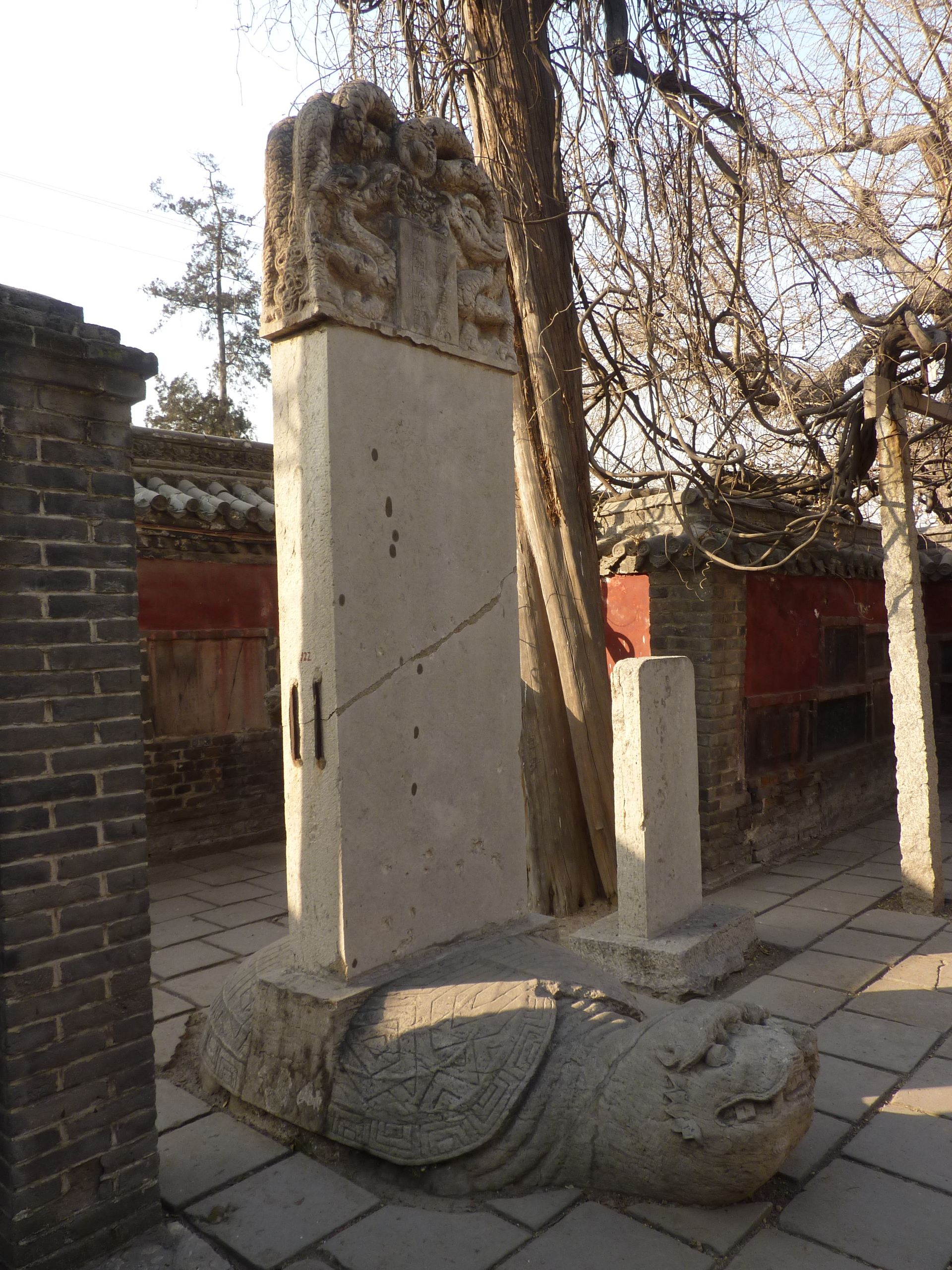
A Yuan dynasty turtle with a stele honoring Mencius

Mencius's interpretation of Confucianism has generally been considered the orthodox version by subsequent Chinese philosophers, especially by the Neo-Confucians of the Song dynasty. Mencius's disciples included a large number of feudal lords, and he is said to have been more influential than Confucius had been.

The Mencius is one of the Four Books that Zhu Xi (1130–1200) grouped as the core of orthodox Neo-Confucian thought. In contrast to the sayings of Confucius, which are short and self-contained, the Mencius consists of long dialogues, including arguments, with extensive prose. It was generally neglected by the Jesuit missionaries who first translated the Confucian canon into Latin and other European languages, as they felt that the Neo-Confucian school largely consisted of Buddhist and Taoist contamination of Confucianism. Matteo Ricci also particularly disliked what they had believed to be condemnation of celibacy as unfilial, which is rather a mistranslation of a similar word referring more to aspects of personality. François Noël, who felt that Zhu's ideas represented a natural and native development of Confucius's thought, was the first to publish a full edition of the Mencius at Prague in 1711 as the Chinese Rites controversy had been recently decided against the Jesuits; however, his edition attained little influence outside central and eastern Europe.

== Mencius Institute ==
The first Mencius Institute (a research and educational academic institute in theoretical Confucianism) was established in Xuzhou, China, in 2008 under a collaboration between Jiangsu Normal University, China Zoucheng Heritage Tourism Bureau, and Xuzhou Mengshi Clan Friendship Network.

First Mencius Institute outside of China is located at Universiti Tunku Abdul Rahman (UTAR) Kampar Campus, Malaysia in 2016.

== See also ==
- Cheng Yi (philosopher)
- Lu Jiuyuan
- Wang Yangming
