= Cheng–Zhu school =

One of the major philosophical schools of Neo-Confucianism

The School of Principle (simplified Chinese: 理学; traditional Chinese: 理學; pinyin: Lǐxué), or the Cheng–Zhu School (Chinese: 程朱理學; pinyin: Chéng Zhū lǐxué), is one of the major philosophical schools of Neo-Confucianism, based on the ideas of the Neo-Confucian philosophers Cheng Yi, Cheng Hao, and Zhu Xi. It is also referred to as the Rationalistic School.

== Metaphysics ==
Zhu Xi's formulation of the Neo-Confucian world view is as follows. He believed that the Dao (Chinese: 道; pinyin: dào; lit. 'way') of Tian (Chinese: 天; pinyin: tiān; lit. 'heaven') is expressed in principle or li (Chinese: 理; pinyin: lǐ), but that it is sheathed in matter or qi (Chinese: 氣; pinyin: qì). In this, his system is based on Buddhist systems of the time that divided things into principle (again, li), and shi (Chinese: 事; pinyin: shì).

In contrast to Buddhists and Daoists, Neo-Confucians did not believe in an external world unconnected with the world of matter. In addition, Neo-Confucians in general rejected the idea of reincarnation and the associated idea of karma.

== Human nature and rationality ==
In the Neo-Confucian formulation, li in itself is pure and almost-perfect, but with the addition of qi, base emotions and conflicts arise. Human nature is originally good, the Neo-Confucians argued (following Mencius), but not pure unless action is taken to purify it. The imperative is then to purify one's li.

Different Neo-Confucians had differing ideas for how to do so. Zhu Xi believed in gewu (Chinese: 格物; pinyin: géwù), the 'investigation of things', essentially an academic form of observational science, based on the idea that li lies within the world.
