= List of Chinese philosophers =

Chinese philosophers include:

== Ancient philosophers ==
=== Confucianism ===
- Confucius, arguably the most influential Chinese philosopher ever.
- Dong Zhongshu, integrated Yin Yang cosmology into a Confucian ethical framework.
- Gaozi
- Mencius, idealist who proposed mankind is innately benevolent.
- Wang Fu, endorsed the Confucian model of government.
- Wang Mang, emperor who sought to create a harmonious society, yet chaos resulted.
- Xunzi, broke from Mencius' view, instead arguing that morality is extrinsic.
- Yan Hui, the favorite disciple of Confucius and one of the most revered figures of Confucianism.
- Zengzi
- Zheng Xuan
- Zisi
- Zhu Xi
- List of Confucianists

=== Daoism ===
- Ge Hong
- Laozi (Lao Tzŭ), illusive founder of Taoism and author of the Tao te Ching (Book of the Way).
- Lie Yukou, said to be the author of the Daoist book Liezi
- Yang Xiong
- Zhang Daoling
- Zhang Jue
- Zhuangzi (Chuang Tzŭ), mystical and relativistic skeptic.
- List of Taoists

=== Chinese School of Naturalists and Naturalism ===
- Zou Yan, combined the theories of Yin-Yang and The Five Elements.

=== Mohism ===
- Mozi (Mo Tzŭ), utilitarian and founder of the Mohist school.
- Lu Ban

=== Legalism ===
- Guan Zhong, whose reforms made him disparagingly identified as Legalist, but actual philosophy did not develop until hundred years later.
- Chao Cuo
- Han Feizi, synthesizer of Legalist theories.
- Li Kui
- Li Si
- Shang Yang
- Shen Buhai
- Shen Dao
- Zi Chan

=== Yangism ===
- Yang Zhu

=== The Logicians ===
- Deng Xi
- Hui Shi, relativistic Logician who influenced Zhuangzi.
- Gongsun Long, logician who was known for his paradoxes.

=== The Agrarians ===
- Xu Xing

=== School of Diplomacy ===
- Xu Pi
- Guiguzi
- Su Qin
- Zhang Yi
- Yue Yi
- Li Yiji

=== School of Military ===
- Sun Tzu
- Sun Bin

== Imperial era philosophers ==
=== Xuanxue ===
- Guo Xiang
- He Yan
- Wang Bi, Three Kingdoms philosopher
- Seven Sages of the Bamboo Grove
  - Ruan Ji
  - Ji Kang
  - Shan Tao
  - Liu Ling
  - Ruan Xian
  - Xiang Xiu

=== Chan Buddhism ===
- Huineng, 6th Buddhist patriarch of the Chan (Zen) School in China, he established the concept of "no mind".
- Linji Yixuan (Lin-chi), founder of the Linji school of Chan (Zen) Buddhism in China, a branch of which is the Rinzai school in Japan.
- Zhaozhou, famous chan (Zen) master during the 8th century, noted for his wisdom. Became known for his subtle teaching methods and his use of gongans.
- Jizang
- Sengzhao
- Yi Xing
- Zhi Dun
- Xuanzang
- Huiyuan

=== Neo-Confucianism ===
- Zhou Dunyi, argued for the inseparability of metaphysics and ethics.
  - Cheng Yi, made enemies with other philosophers, resulting in his works being banned.
  - Cheng Hao, brother to Cheng Yi.
  - Zhu Xi (Chu Hsi), rationalist and leading figure of the School of Principle.
    - Chen Hongmou, argued for racial and sexual equality in the place of education.
    - Wang Fuzhi, believed Confucius' teachings had become distorted, so wrote his own commentaires.
    - Wang Yangming, idealist and leading figure of the School of Mind.
      - Li Zhi, preached a form of moral relativism.
      - Qian Dehong, further developed The Yangming School of Mind.
      - Xu Ai, ardent follower of Wang Yangming.
      - Huang Zongxi, one of the first Neo-Confucians to stress the need for constitutional law.
      - Zhan Ruoshui, lifelong friend to Wang Yangming.
- Han Yu, precursor to Neo-Confucianism, essayist, and poet.
- Lu Jiuyuan, saw moral conduct as a consequence of intuitive insights into the essence of reality.
- Shao Yong, considered one of the most scholarly men of the time.
- Su Shi, accomplished Song Dynasty writer.
- Ye Shi, stressed practical learning and applying Confucian doctrine to real world problems.
- Zhang Zai, everything is composed of qi, and that fact explains everything.
- Lai Zhide, created the Taijitu.
- Li Ao
- Liu Zongzhou – considered the last master of Song-Ming Neo-Confucianism.

=== Islamic-Confucianism ===
- Wang Daiyu
  - Liu Zhi
  - Ma Zhu

=== Kaozheng Evidential Research ===
- Wang Fuzhi
- Gu Yanwu
- Yan Yuan
- Dai Zhen
- Duan Yucai
- Ji Xiaolan
- Zhang Xuecheng
- Ruan Yuan
- Kang Youwei
- Tan Sitong
- Hong Liangji

== Philosophers that cannot be easily categorised ==
- Pan Pingge, criticised Neo-Confucianism, instead emphasized the search for truth in daily living.
- Dai Zhen, made two arguments against Neo-Confucianism.
- Fan Zhen, denied the ideas of reincarnation and body-soul dualism.
- Huan Tan
- Wang Chong
- Ma Rong
- Shen Kuo
- Ximen Bao

== Modern philosophers ==
- Feng Youlan (Fung Yu-Lan), rationalist who integrated Neo-Confucian, Taoist, and Western metaphysics.
- Jin Yuelin, logical positivist and logician.
- Tu Weiming, ethicist.
- Xiong Shili
- Ma Yifu
- Mou Zongsan
- Tang Junyi
- Xu Fuguan
- Zhang Dongsun
- Carsun Chang (Zhang Junmai)
- Zhou Guoping
- Tsang Lap Chuen (曾立存)

== Chinese Marxist Philosophy ==
- Mao Zedong
- Deng Xiaoping
- Wang Ruoshui
- Li Da
- Ai Siqi
- Chen Duxiu
- Qu Qiubai
- Xi Jinping
- Yang Xianzhen
- Yang Rongguo
- Zhang Shiying
