= Chinese philosophy =

Type of philosophy

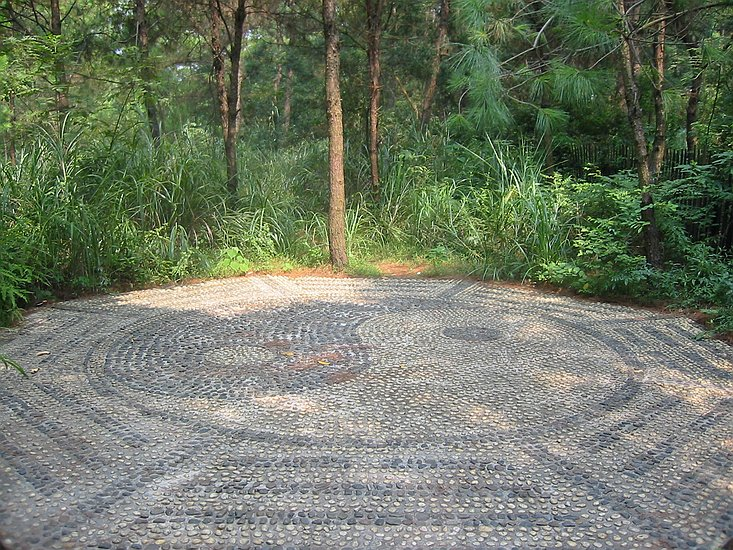
- Yin and Yang symbol with the bagua symbols paved in a clearing outside of Nanning, Guangxi, China

Chinese name
- Traditional Chinese: 中國哲學
- Simplified Chinese: 中国哲学
Transcriptions
Standard Mandarin
- Hanyu Pinyin: Zhōngguó zhéxué
- Bopomofo: ㄓㄨㄥ ㄍㄨㄛˊ ㄓㄜˊ ㄒㄩㄝˊ
- Gwoyeu Romatzyh: Jonggwo jershyue
- Wade–Giles: Chung^{1}-kuo^{2} che^{2}-hsüeh^{2}
- Tongyong Pinyin: Jhong-guó jhé-syué
- IPA: [ʈʂʊ́ŋ.kwǒ ʈʂɤ̌.ɕɥě]
Wu
- Romanization: Tson-kueʔ tseʔ-ghoʔ
Hakka
- Romanization: Zung^{1}-get^{5} ziet^{5}-hok^{6}
Yue: Cantonese
- Yale Romanization: Jūng-gwok jit-hohk
- Jyutping: zung1 gwok3 zit3 hok6
- IPA: [tsʊŋ˥ kʷɔk̚˧ tsit̚˧ hɔk̚˨]
Southern Min
- Hokkien POJ: Tiong-kok tiat-ha̍k

Vietnamese name
- Vietnamese: Triết học Trung Quốc
- Chữ Hán: 哲學中國

Korean name
- Hangul: 중국 철학
- Hanja: 中國哲學
Transcriptions
- Revised Romanization: Jungguk cheolhak
- McCune–Reischauer: Chungguk ch'ŏrhak

Japanese name
- Kanji: 中国哲学
- Hiragana: ちゅうごくてつがく
- Katakana: チュウゴクテツガク
Transcriptions
- Romanization: Chūgoku tetsugaku
- Kunrei-shiki: Tyûgoku tetugaku

Chinese philosophy (traditional Chinese: 中國哲學; simplified Chinese: 中国哲学) refers to the philosophical traditions that originated and developed within the historical and cultural context of China. It encompasses systematic reflections on issues such as existence, knowledge, ethics, and politics. Evolving over more than two millennia, Chinese philosophy includes classical traditions such as Confucianism, Daoism, and Buddhism, as well as modern responses to Western philosophical currents. As a cultural form of philosophy, it addresses universal philosophical concerns while also reflecting the specific historical and social conditions of China.

The historical development of Chinese philosophy began during the Spring and Autumn and Warring States periods, a time known as the "Hundred Schools of Thought". Major schools such as Confucianism, Daoism, Mohism, and Legalism emerged with distinct views on human nature, social order, and political authority. During the Han dynasty, Confucianism was established as the official ideology, shaping China's intellectual and political systems for centuries. In subsequent eras, Chinese philosophy integrated influences from Indian Buddhism, giving rise to new developments such as Neo-Confucianism in the Song and Ming dynasties. In the modern period, Chinese thinkers engaged with Western thought, resulting in the emergence of Three Principles of the People, Chinese Marxism, New Confucianism, and other philosophical movements. Throughout the 20th century, these traditions were reshaped by political upheaval and continue to evolve today.

Chinese philosophy, like other philosophical traditions, engages with fundamental questions in metaphysics, epistemology, ethics, and political philosophy. Thinkers across various schools explored debates about the nature of human goodness, the source of moral knowledge, and the foundations of social order. Confucianism emphasizes ethical cultivation and political responsibility; Daoism advocates a life in accordance with nature and spontaneity; and Buddhist and Neo-Confucian thinkers developed detailed theories of consciousness and moral practice. Beyond abstract theorizing, Chinese philosophy has played a significant role in shaping Chinese education, governance, and cultural life. In the modern era, Chinese philosophers continue to reinterpret classical ideas while engaging with global philosophical discourse.

Chinese philosophy has exerted significant influence across East Asia. Buddhist thought and Neo-Confucian philosophy spread to Korea, Japan, and Vietnam, where they shaped local intellectual and educational traditions. During the 17th and 18th centuries, Confucianism attracted the interest of European Enlightenment thinkers—often through idealized or inaccurate interpretations—which nonetheless played a role in debates about reason, morality, and secular governance. In the contemporary era, Chinese philosophy is gaining greater visibility in global academia, though challenges remain regarding its integration into broader philosophical discourse beyond cultural or regional frameworks.

== Overview ==
The development of Chinese philosophy began in earnest during the Spring and Autumn and Warring States periods (c. 770–221 BCE), an era later known as the "Hundred Schools of Thought". Thinkers such as Confucius, Mencius, Laozi, Zhuangzi, Mozi, Han Fei, and Xunzi laid the foundations for enduring traditions like Confucianism, Taoism, Mohism, and Legalism. These schools addressed questions of ethics, governance, human nature, and the ideal social order, reflecting the intellectual ferment of a politically fragmented age. Legalism as a coherent philosophy disappeared largely due to its relationship with the unpopular authoritarian rule of Qin Shi Huang. However, many of its ideas and institutions would continue to influence Chinese philosophy throughout the Han dynasty and after.

During the early Han dynasty, these competing traditions began to merge in practice, but it was not until the reign of Emperor Wu (141–87 BCE) that Confucianism, through the work of Dong Zhongshu, was officially adopted as state ideology. This institutionalization of a mysticized form of Confucianism, infused with cosmological elements from Yin-Yang and Five Elements theories (陰陽五行)—often summarized as "rejecting the Hundred Schools, honoring Confucianism alone" (罷黜百家，獨尊儒術)—would shape Chinese education, bureaucracy, and political thought for centuries. Daoism, meanwhile, developed into an organized religion, while Buddhism entered China from India and gained increasing prominence in the centuries that followed.

Buddhism entered China during the Han dynasty and developed into a major philosophical force through the translation efforts of figures like Kumārajīva and Xuanzang, who introduced Madhyamaka (中觀) and Yogācāra (唯識) thought, which profoundly influenced Chinese metaphysics, epistemology, and soteriology. In the 5th–7th centuries, Indian monk Bodhidharma transmitted the foundations of Chan Buddhism, which was later transformed by Huineng into a distinctly Chinese tradition emphasizing sudden awakening (頓悟) and direct experience. Over time, Buddhist metaphysics and moral psychology significantly influenced Daoist thought and provoked Confucian responses, laying the groundwork for later syntheses such as Neo-Confucianism.

Beginning in the mid-Tang dynasty, certain scholars with a strong sense of cultural identity initiated efforts to revive Confucianism in response to what they perceived as moral nihilism in Buddhism. Han Yu was a leading figure in this movement; he criticized Buddhist monastics for being unproductive and for undermining the Confucian ethic of social responsibility. Following two major waves of Buddhist suppression (三武一宗滅佛) under Emperor Wuzong of Tang and Emperor Shizong of Later Zhou, Buddhism's dominance in political and intellectual life declined. During the Song dynasty, Confucian scholar-officials critically absorbed elements of Buddhist and Daoist philosophy and practice, laying the foundations for what became Neo-Confucianism. Zhang Zai articulated a philosophy of qi (matter, 氣) as the material basis of all existence. The Cheng brothers (Cheng Hao and Cheng Yi) emphasized li (principle, 理) and the necessity of internal cultivation to eliminate selfish desires and restore moral nature.

Building on these earlier thinkers, Zhu Xi systematized Neo-Confucian thought into a comprehensive metaphysical and ethical framework. He posited li (principle) as the underlying structure of the cosmos, advocated for "investigation of things" (格物) as the path to knowledge, and emphasized the importance of preserving tianli (Heavenly Principle, 天理) by eliminating personal desire. From the Yuan dynasty onward, the School of Principle became state orthodoxy and the basis of the imperial examination system throughout the Ming and Qing dynasties, playing a central role in governance, education, and moral regulation. During the late Ming period, rapid commercial expansion and a flourishing publishing industry gave rise to new currents of thought, many of which challenged Zhu Xi's doctrines. The most influential among them was Wang Yangming's School of Mind, which replaced external investigation with introspective moral awareness (良知) and emphasized the unity of knowledge and action to solve Zhu's epistemology paradox. Wang's philosophy gained wide support and even political traction, though it never supplanted the School of Principle as the state-sanctioned orthodoxy. After the fall of the Ming, Confucian scholars entered a period of deep reflection. Among them, Wang Fuzhi developed an integrative synthesis drawing from Neo-Confucianism, Buddhism, and Daoism. Though his influence was limited during his lifetime, his ideas gained renewed interest in the late Qing and would later be reinterpreted as a source of inspiration for modern political ideologies, including aspects of Maoist thought. The Qing dynasty saw the rise of evidential scholarship (乾嘉學派) and philology, though official ideology remained conservative, especially during the height of literary inquisition.

Beginning in the late Qing dynasty, Chinese philosophy underwent a profound transformation in response to national crisis, Western imperialism, and the collapse of the dynastic worldview. Thinkers such as Yan Fu introduced liberalism, Social Darwinism, and utilitarian thought through translations of Western works, while reformers like Kang Youwei sought to modernize Confucianism into a national religion (立教改制). During the early Republic of China period, the New Culture Movement promoted science and democracy while denouncing traditional morality, leading to the marginalization of classical Confucianism. Meanwhile, under the influence of Abraham Lincoln, Sun Yat-sen developed the Three Principles of the People—nationalism (民族), democracy (民權), and people's livelihood (民生)—as a political-philosophical framework that blended Western republicanism with Chinese moral values. The ideology of Kuomintang incorporated this system into its governance strategy, creating a modernist yet culturally rooted foundation for the Chinese state. Following the April 12 Purge, Chiang Kai-shek's Nationalist right-wing synthesized the Three Principles of the People with Confucianism, authoritarian governance, and nationalist ideology, developing a framework explicitly opposed to both liberalism and Marxism which often referred to as Chiangism.

Mao Zedong Thought drew from Soviet Marxism–Leninism, particularly Stalinist doctrine, as well as late Qing Hunanese intellectual traditions and the anti-elitist, anti-capitalist sentiments prevalent in the Nationalist government. In the struggle for ideological leadership within the Communist Party against Wang Ming, Mao reinterpreted Marxist terminology and developed a distinctive theoretical system centered on concepts like practice (实践), contradiction (矛盾), and dialectical materialism, which gained institutional authority following his political success and became the unquestioned orthodoxy. Following the Communist victory in 1949, Maoism became the dominant state ideological system. During the later stages of the Cultural Revolution, its discourse became increasingly ritualized and detached from theoretical coherence. Although the Maoist period ended in 1976, Mao Zedong Thought remains one of the guiding ideologies of the Chinese Communist Party, and its paradigmatic impact on philosophical discourse, institutional norms, and modes of intellectual expression continues to shape Chinese thought.

Since the 1980s, Chinese philosophy has gradually diversified under conditions of economic reform. New Confucianism, initially developed by scholars in Taiwan and Hong Kong such as Mou Zongsan and Tang Junyi, was reintroduced into the mainland and engaged in dialogue with Western humanism. At the same time, Marxist humanism, existentialism, phenomenology, Frankfurt School, Rawlsianism, and analytic philosophy gained influence in academic circles. State ideology shifted toward "Socialism with Chinese Characteristics", emphasizing pragmatism and national rejuvenation while selectively drawing on traditional values. Though political constraints remain, contemporary philosophers have attempted to develop original frameworks addressing global ethics, language, and subjectivity. Nevertheless, the legacy of revolutionary philosophy and ongoing state involvement in ideology continue to shape the structure and limits of philosophical inquiry in China.

In addition to the Confucian, Daoist, and Buddhist traditions rooted in Han cultural regions, other philosophical systems developed across China's multiethnic landscape. Tibetan Buddhism, which took shape from the Yuan dynasty onward, formed a systematic tradition incorporating Madhyamaka thought and Buddhist logic (pramāṇa, 因明), particularly through the Gelug school founded by Tsongkhapa. This tradition had a major influence on Mongolian and Manchu political institutions and continues to play a central role in Tibetan intellectual life.

Beginning in the 17th century, Catholic missionaries, especially Jesuits like Matteo Ricci and Johann Adam Schall von Bell, introduced Aristotelian and Thomistic philosophy to China. They translated Western philosophical concepts into Confucian terminology and attempted to establish a dialogue between Catholic theology and Chinese ethical traditions. Although controversial, these efforts created an enduring legacy of cross-cultural exchange that shaped the development of modern Chinese intellectual history.

Islamic philosophy in China—often referred to as Islamic Heavenly Studies (天方理學)—flourished particularly during the Ming and Qing dynasties. Muslim scholars such as Liu Zhi and Ma Zhu synthesized Islamic theology with Confucian ethics, developing distinctive metaphysical and ethical frameworks known as "Hui Confucianism" (回儒). Their works reflected efforts to reconcile Islamic and Chinese thought within a shared intellectual world.

== Early beliefs ==
Early Shang dynasty thought was based on cycles like the 10 stems and 12 earthly branches. This notion stems from what the people of the Shang dynasty could observe around them: day and night cycles, the seasons progressed again and again, and even the moon waxed and waned until it waxed again. Thus, this notion, which remained relevant throughout Chinese history, reflects the order of nature. In juxtaposition, it also marks a fundamental distinction from western philosophy, in which the dominant view of time is a linear progression. During the Shang, Ancestor worship was present and universally recognized.

When the Shang were overthrown by the Zhou a new political, religious and philosophical concept was introduced called the Mandate of Heaven. This mandate was said to be taken when rulers became unworthy of their position and provided a justification for Zhou rule it is said that the Duke of Zhou made the early solar terms by measuring with a gnomon that was added to make the complete solar terms. He is also said to have used try squares and wrote the Zhoubi Suanjing with his astrologer. Several early beliefs might be found in the Guicang and perhaps the earliest Chinese book, the small calendar of the Xia in Da Dai Liji, though debated to exist the Xia dynasty is said to be its origin.

== Ancient philosophy ==
=== Spring and Autumn period ===
Around 500 BCE, after the Zhou state weakened and China moved into the Spring and Autumn period, the classic period of Chinese philosophy began. This is known as the Hundred Schools of Thought. This period is considered the golden age of Chinese philosophy. Of the many schools founded at this time and during the subsequent Warring States period, the four most influential ones were Confucianism, Daoism (often spelled "Taoism"), Mohism and Legalism.

==== Confucianism ====
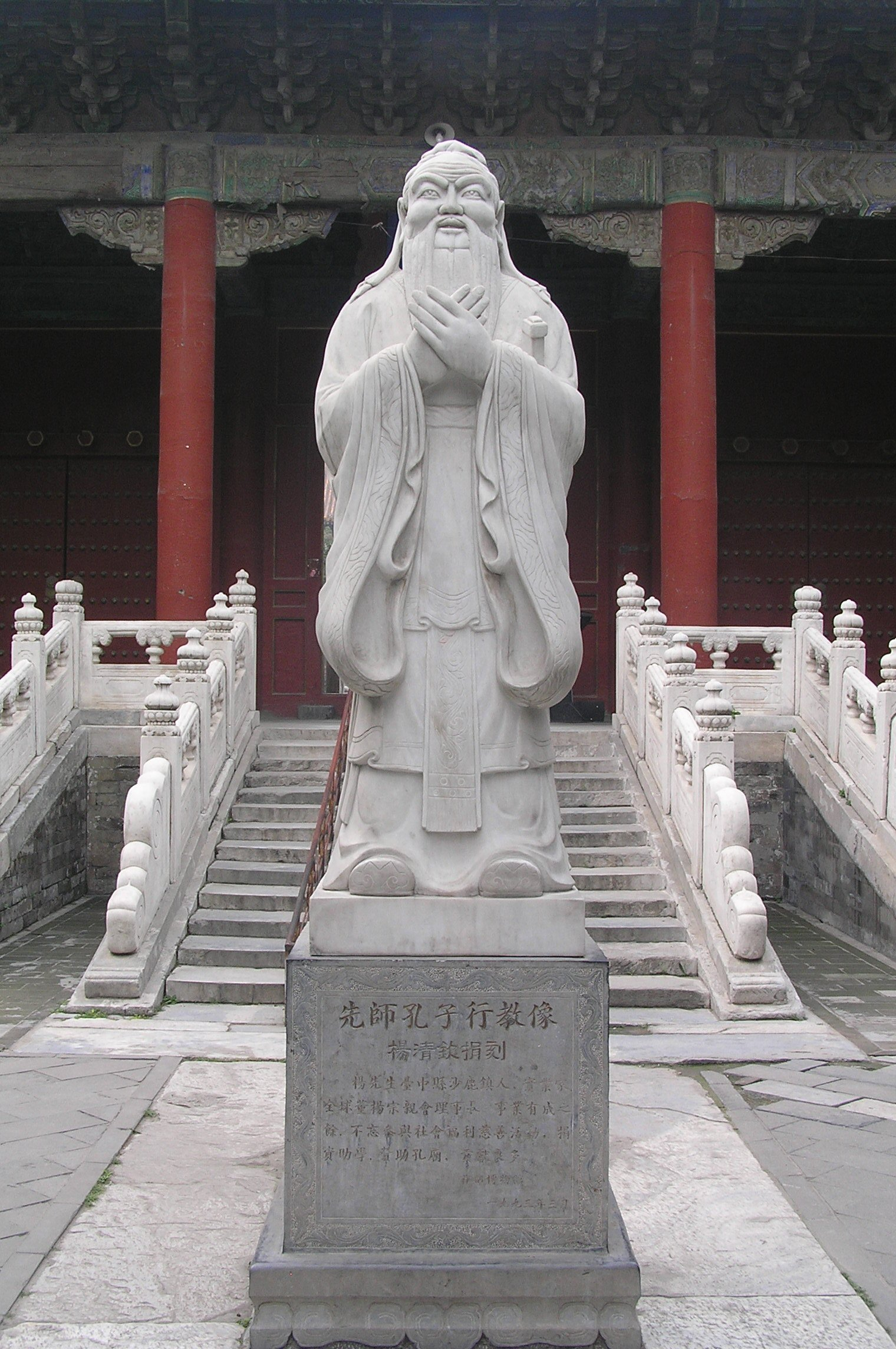
Kong Fuzi (Latin: Confucius)

Confucianism is a philosophical school developed from the teachings of Confucius collected and written by his disciples after his death in The Analects, and in the Warring States period, Mencius in The Mencius and Xunzi in The Xunzi. It is a system of moral, social, political, and religious thought that has had tremendous influence on Chinese history, thought, and culture down to the 20th century. Some Westerners have considered it to have been the "state religion" of imperial China because of its lasting influence on Asian culture. Its influence also spread to Korea, Japan, Vietnam and many other Asian countries.

Confucianism reached its peak of influence during the Tang and Song dynasties under a rebranded Confucianism called Neo-Confucianism. Confucius expanded on the already present ideas of Chinese religion and culture to reflect the time period and environment of political chaos during the Warring States period. Because Confucius embedded the Chinese culture so heavily into his philosophy it was able to resonate with the people of China. However, the relationship between Confucianism and contemporary Chinese society is continuously transforming, reflecting the evolving cultural, political, and social landscape of modern China.

The major Confucian concepts include filial piety, loyalty (忠; zhōng), li (ritual), ren (humanity or humaneness), the rectification of names (i.e., to ensure everything is what its name implies it should be). Confucius taught both positive and negative versions of the Golden Rule. The concepts yin and yang represent two opposing forces that are permanently in conflict with each other, leading to perpetual contradiction and change. The Confucian idea of "Rid of the two ends, take the middle" is a Chinese equivalent of the idea of "thesis, antithesis, and synthesis", often attributed to Hegel, which is a way of reconciling opposites, arriving at some middle ground combining the best of both.

Confucius heavily emphasized the idea of microcosms in society (subunits of family and community) success's were the foundations for a successful state or country. Confucius believed in the use of education to further knowledge the people in ethics, societal behavior, and reverence in other humans. With the combination of education, successful family, and his ethical teachings he believed he could govern a well established society in China.

==== Taoism ====
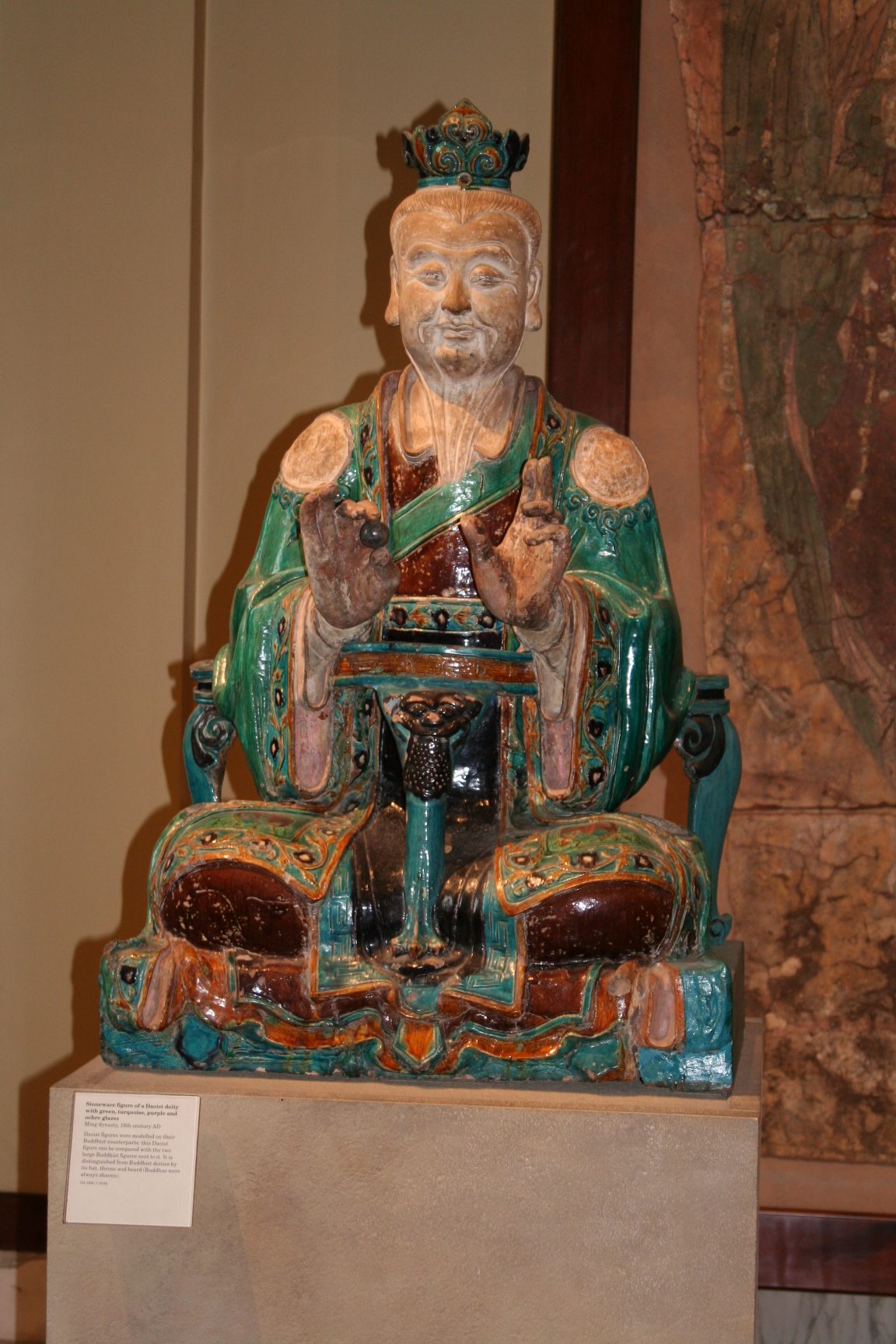
Chinese glazed stoneware statue of a Daoist deity, from the Ming dynasty, 16th century

Bagua: Modern Taijitu with I Ching trigrams

Taoism arose as a philosophy and later also developed into a religion based on the texts the Tao Te Ching (ascribed to Laozi) and the Zhuangzi (partly ascribed to Zhuang Zhou). The word Tao (道; also transliterated as Dao) literally means 'path' or 'way'. However, in Taoism it refers more often to a meta-physical force that encompasses the entire universe but which cannot be described nor felt.

All major Chinese philosophical schools have investigated the correct Way to go about a moral life, but in Taoism it takes on the most abstract meanings, leading this school to be named after it. It advocated nonaction (wu wei), the strength of softness, spontaneity, and relativism. Although it serves as a rival to Confucianism, a school of active morality, this rivalry is compromised and given perspective by the idiom "practice Confucianism on the outside, Taoism on the inside."

Most of Taoism's focus is on the notion that human attempts to make the world better actually make the world worse. Therefore, it is better to strive for harmony, minimising potentially harmful interference with nature or in human affairs.

=== Warring States period ===
==== Legalism ====
Philosopher Han Fei synthesized together earlier the methods of his predecessors, which famous historian Sima Tan posthumously termed Legalism. With an essential principle like "when the epoch changed, the ways changed", late pre-Han dynasty reformers emphasized rule by law.

In Han Fei's philosophy, a ruler should govern his subjects by the following trinity:

1. Fa (法; fǎ): law or principle.
2. Shu (術; shù): method, tactic, art, or statecraft.
3. Shi (勢; shì): legitimacy, power, or charisma.

What has been termed by some as the intrastate Realpolitik of the Warring States period was highly progressive, and extremely critical of the Confucian and Mohist schools. But that of the Qin dynasty would be blamed for creating a totalitarian society, thereby experiencing decline. Its main motto is: "Set clear strict laws, or deliver harsh punishment". In Han Fei's philosophy the ruler possessed authority regarding reward and penalty, enacted through law. Shang Yang and Han Fei promoted absolute adherence to the law, regardless of the circumstances or the person. Ministers were only to be rewarded if their words were accurate to the results of their proposals. Legalism, in accordance with Shang Yang's interpretation, could encourage the state to be a militaristic autarky.

==== Naturalists ====
The School of Naturalists or the School of Yin-yang (Chinese: 陰陽家; pinyin: Yīnyángjiā; Wade–Giles: Yin-yang-chia; lit. 'School of Yin-Yang') was a Warring States era philosophy that synthesized the concepts of yin-yang and the wuxing; Zou Yan is considered the founder of this school. His theory attempted to explain the universe in terms of basic forces in nature: the complementary agents of yin (dark, cold, female, negative) and yang (light, hot, male, positive) and the Five Elements or Five Phases (water, fire, wood, metal, and earth).

In its early days, this theory was most strongly associated with the states of Yan and Qi. In later periods, these epistemological theories came to hold significance in both philosophy and popular belief. This school was absorbed into Taoism's alchemic and magical dimensions as well as into the Chinese medical framework. The earliest surviving recordings of this are in the Mawangdui texts and Huangdi Neijing.

==== Mohism ====
Mohism (Moism), founded by Mozi, promotes universal love with the aim of mutual benefit. Everyone must love each other equally and impartially to avoid conflict and war. Mozi was strongly against Confucian ritual, instead emphasizing pragmatic survival through farming, fortification, and statecraft. Tradition is inconsistent, and human beings need an extra-traditional guide to identify which traditions are acceptable. The moral guide must then promote and encourage social behaviors that maximize general benefit. As motivation for his theory, Mozi brought in the Will of Heaven, but rather than being religious his philosophy parallels utilitarianism.

==== Logicians ====
The logicians (School of Names) were concerned with logic, paradoxes, names and actuality (similar to Confucian rectification of names). The logician Hui Shi was a friendly rival to Zhuangzi, arguing against Taoism in a light-hearted and humorous manner. Another logician, Gongsun Long, originated the famous When a White Horse is Not a Horse dialogue.

==== Agriculturalists ====
Agriculturalism was an early agrarian social and political philosophy that advocated peasant utopian communalism and egalitarianism. The philosophy is founded on the notion that human society originates with the development of agriculture, and societies are based upon "people's natural propensity to farm."

The Agriculturalists believed that the ideal government, modeled after the semi-mythical governance of Shennong, is led by a benevolent king, one who works alongside the people in tilling the fields. The Agriculturalist king is not paid by the government through its treasuries; his livelihood is derived from the profits he earns working in the fields, not his leadership. Unlike the Confucians, the Agriculturalists did not believe in the division of labour, arguing instead that the economic policies of a country need to be based upon an egalitarian self sufficiency. The Agriculturalists supported the fixing of prices, in which all similar goods, regardless of differences in quality and demand, are set at exactly the same, unchanging price.

== Early imperial era philosophy ==
=== History ===
==== Qin and Han dynasties ====
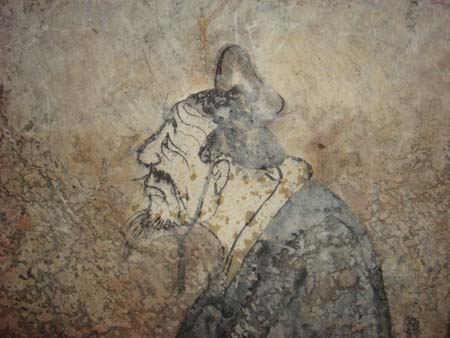
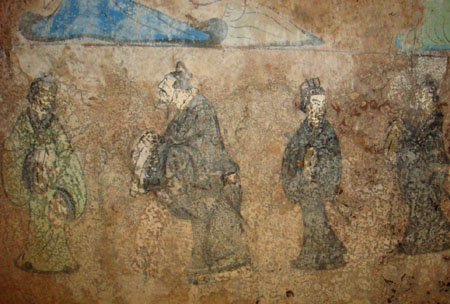
A Western Han (202 BC – 9 AD) fresco depicting Confucius (and Laozi), from a tomb of Dongping County, Shandong province, China

The short founder Qin dynasty, where Legalism was the official philosophy, quashed Mohist and Confucianist schools. Legalism remained influential during the early Han dynasty under the Taoist-Realist ideology Huang-Lao until Emperor Wu of Han adopted Confucianism as official doctrine. Confucianism and Taoism became the determining forces of Chinese thought until the introduction of Buddhism.

Confucianism was particularly strong during the Han dynasty, whose greatest thinker was Dong Zhongshu, who integrated Confucianism with the thoughts of the Zhongshu School and the theory of the Five Elements. He also was a promoter of the New Text school, which considered Confucius as a divine figure and a spiritual ruler of China, who foresaw and started the evolution of the world towards the Universal Peace.

In contrast, there was an Old Text school that advocated the use of Confucian works written in ancient language (from this comes the denomination Old Text) that were so much more reliable. In particular, they refuted the assumption of Confucius as a godlike figure and considered him as the greatest sage, but simply a human and mortal

==== Six Dynasties ====
The 3rd and 4th centuries saw the rise of the Xuanxue (mysterious learning), also called Neo-Taoism.

Buddhism arrived in China around the 1st century AD, but it was not until the Northern and Southern, Sui and Tang dynasties that it gained considerable influence and acknowledgement. At the beginning, it was considered a sort of Taoist sect. Mahayana Buddhism was far more successful in China than its rival Hinayana, and both Indian schools and local Chinese sects arose from the 5th century. Two chiefly important monk philosophers were Sengzhao and Daosheng. But probably the most influential and original of these schools was the Chan sect, which had an even stronger impact in Japan as the Zen sect.

In the mid-Tang Buddhism reached its peak, and reportedly there were 4,600 monasteries, 40,000 hermitages and 260,500 monks and nuns. The power of the Buddhist clergy was so great and the wealth of the monasteries so impressive, that it instigated criticism from Confucian scholars, who considered Buddhism as a foreign religion. In 845 Emperor Wuzong ordered the Great Anti-Buddhist Persecution, confiscating the riches and returning monks and nuns to lay life. From then on, Buddhism lost much of its influence.

=== Schools of thought ===
==== Xuanxue ====
Xuanxue was a philosophical school that combined elements of Confucianism and Taoism to reinterpret the I Ching,Tao Te Ching, and Zhuangzi. The most important philosophers of this movement were Wang Bi, Xiang Xiu and Guo Xiang. The main question of this school was whether Being came before Not-Being (in Chinese, ming and wuming). A peculiar feature of these Taoist thinkers, like the Seven Sages of the Bamboo Grove, was the concept of feng liu (lit. wind and flow), a sort of romantic spirit which encouraged following the natural and instinctive impulse.

==== Buddhism ====
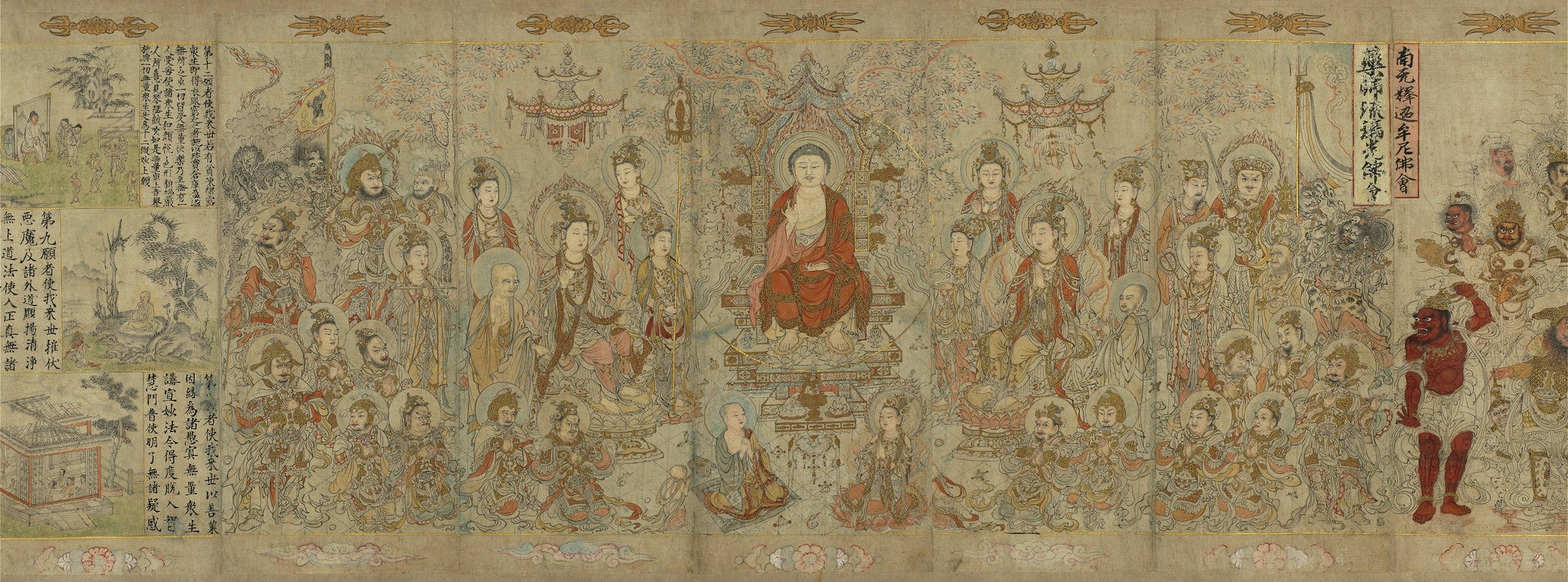
The Sakyamuni Buddha, by artist Zhang Shengwen, 1173–1176 CE, Song dynasty

Buddhism is a religion, a practical philosophy, and arguably a psychology, focusing on the teachings of Gautama Buddha, who lived on the Indian subcontinent most likely from the mid-6th to the early 5th century BCE. When used in a generic sense, a Buddha is generally considered to be someone who discovers the true nature of reality.

Buddhism until the 4th century AD had little impact on China but in the 4th century its teachings hybridized with those of Taoism. Buddhism brought to China the idea of many hells, where sinners went, but the deceased sinners souls could be saved by pious acts. Since Chinese traditional thought focused more on ethics rather than metaphysics, the merging of Buddhist and Taoist concepts developed several schools distinct from the originating Indian schools.

The most prominent examples with philosophical merit are Sanlun, Tiantai, Huayan, and Chan (a.k.a. Zen). They investigate consciousness, levels of truth, whether reality is ultimately empty, and how enlightenment is to be achieved. Buddhism has a spiritual aspect that complements the action of Neo-Confucianism, with prominent Neo-Confucians advocating certain forms of meditation.

== Mid to late imperial era philosophy ==
=== History ===
Neo-Confucianism was a revived version of old Confucian principles that appeared around the Song dynasty, with Buddhist, Taoist, and Legalist features. The first philosophers, such as Shao Yong, Zhou Dunyi and Chang Zai, were cosmologists and worked on the I Ching. The Cheng brothers, Cheng Yi and Cheng Hao, are considered the founders of the two main schools of thought of Neo-Confucianism: the School of Principle the first, the School of Mind the latter.

The School of Principle gained supremacy during the Song dynasty with the philosophical system elaborated by Zhu Xi, which became mainstream and officially adopted by the government for the imperial examinations under the Yuan dynasty. The School of Mind was developed by Lu Jiuyuan, Zhu Xi's main rival, but was soon forgotten. Only during the Ming dynasty was the School of Mind revived by Wang Shouren, whose influence is equal to that of Zhu Xi. This school was particularly important in Japan.

During the Qing dynasty many philosophers objected against Neo-Confucianism and there was a return to the Han dynasty Confucianism, and also the reprise of the controversy between Old Text and New Text. In this period also started the penetration of Western culture, but most Chinese thought that the Westerners were maybe more advanced in technology and warfare, but that China had primacy in moral and intellectual fields.

Chinese culture was highly influential on the traditions of other East Asian states, and its philosophy directly influenced Korean philosophy, Vietnamese philosophy and Japanese philosophy. During later Chinese dynasties like the Ming dynasty (1368–1644), as well as in the Korean Joseon dynasty (1392–1897), a resurgent Neo-Confucianism led by thinkers such as Wang Yangming (1472–1529) became the dominant school of thought and was promoted by the imperial state. In Japan, the Tokugawa shogunate (1603–1867) was also strongly influenced by Confucian philosophy.

=== Schools of thought ===
==== Neo-Confucianism ====
Despite Confucianism losing popularity to Taoism and Buddhism, Neo-Confucianism combined those ideas into a more metaphysical framework. Its concepts include li (principle, akin to Plato's forms), qi (vital or material force), taiji (the Great Ultimate), and xin (mind). Song dynasty philosopher Zhou Dunyi (1017–1073) is commonly seen as the first true "pioneer" of Neo-Confucianism, using Daoist metaphysics as a framework for his ethical philosophy.

Neo-Confucianism developed both as a renaissance of traditional Confucian ideas, and as a reaction to the ideas of Buddhism and religious Daoism. Although the Neo-Confucianists denounced Buddhist metaphysics, Neo-Confucianism did borrow Daoist and Buddhist terminology and concepts. Neo-Confucianist philosophers like Zhu Xi and Wang Yangming are seen as the most important figures of Neo-Confucianism.

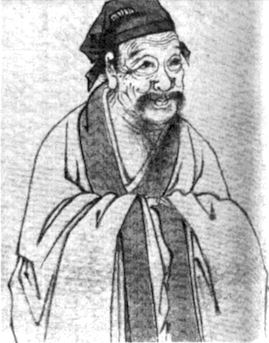
Zhu Xi was a leading figure in Neo-Confucianism.

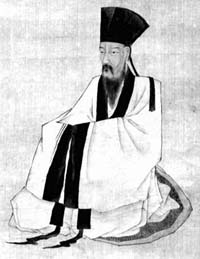
Wang Yangming was an important figure in Neo-Confucianism.

== Modern era ==
During the Industrial and Modern Ages, Chinese philosophy had also begun to integrate concepts of Western philosophy, as steps toward modernization. Chinese philosophy never developed the concept of human rights, so that classical Chinese lacked words for them. In 1864, W.A.P. Martin had to invent the word quanli (Chinese: 權利) to translate the Western concept of "rights" in the process of translating Henry Wheaton's Elements of International Law into classical Chinese.

By the time of the Xinhai Revolution in 1911, there were many calls such as the May Fourth Movement to completely abolish the old imperial institutions and practices of China. There have been attempts to incorporate democracy, republicanism, and industrialism into Chinese philosophy, notably by Sun Yat-Sen at the beginning of the 20th century. Mao Zedong added Marxism, Stalinism, Chinese Marxist Philosophy and other communist thought.

When the Chinese Communist Party took over in 1949, previous schools of thought were denounced as backward, and later purged during the Cultural Revolution as part of the campaign against the Four Olds.

During the Xi Jinping general secretaryship, the People's Republic of China has promoted a revival in Chinese philosophy. In 2024, East China Normal University established the Chinese Zhuzi Research Institute to promote the study of Chinese philosophies.

=== New Confucianism ===
New Confucianism (Chinese: 新儒家; pinyin: Xīn Rújiā; lit. 'New Confucianism') is an intellectual movement of Confucianism that began in the early 20th century in Republican China, and further developed in post-Mao era contemporary China. It primarily developed during the May Fourth Movement. It is deeply influenced by, but not identical to, the neo-Confucianism of the Song and Ming dynasties.

== Philosophers ==
- Confucius, seen as the Great Master but sometimes ridiculed by Taoists.
  - Mencius, Confucius' follower having idealist inspiration
  - Xun Zi, another Confucius' follower, closer to realism, teacher of Han Fei and Li Si
  - Zhu Xi, founder of Neo-Confucianism
  - Wang Yangming, most influential proponent of "state of mind." (Xinxue)
- Laozi, the semi-mythical founder of Taoist school.
  - Zhuang Zhou, said to be the author of the Zhuangzi.
  - Lie Yukou, said to be the author of the Liezi.
- Yang Zhu, proposed ethical egoism and founded Yangism.
- Mozi, the founder of Mohist school.
- Shang Yang, Legalist founder and pivotal Qin reformer
- Han Fei, one of the most notable theoreticians of Legalism
- Li Si, major proponent and practitioner of Legalism

== Chinese philosophy as a philosophy ==
The debate over whether the thought of ancient Chinese masters should be called philosophy has been discussed since the introduction of this academic discipline into China. See Historiography of Chinese philosophy for details.

== Concepts ==
Although the individual philosophical schools differ considerably, they nevertheless share a common vocabulary and set of concerns.

Among the terms commonly found in Chinese philosophy are:

- Dao (道, the Way, or one's doctrine)
- De (德, virtue, power)
- Li (理, principle, Law)
- Qi (氣, vital energy or material force)
- Tai-chi (太極, Great Heavenly Axis) forms a unity of the two complementary polarities, Yin and Yang. The word Yin originally referred to a hillside facing away from the sun. Philosophically, it stands the dark, passive, feminine principle; whereas Yang (the hillside facing the sun) stands for the bright, active, masculine principle. Yin and Yang are not antagonistic, they alternate in inverse proportion to one another—like the rise and fall of a wave and are known by their comparison.

Among the commonalities of Chinese philosophies are:

- The tendency not to view man as separate from nature.
- Questions about the nature and existence of a monotheistic deity, which have profoundly influenced Western philosophy, have not been important in Chinese philosophies or a source of great conflict in Chinese traditional religion.
- The belief that the purpose of philosophy is primarily to serve as an ethical and practical guide.
- The political focus: most scholars of the Hundred Schools were trying to convince the ruler to behave in the way they defended.

== See also ==
- Chinese classic texts
- History of China
- Chinese philosophers
- Confucianism
- Culture of China
- Eastern philosophy
- Five Elements
- Hun and po
- List of Chinese philosophers
- Taoism
- Thirteen Classics
