= Pan Pingge =

Chinese philosopher

Pan Pingge (Chinese: 潘平格; pinyin: Pān Pínggé; 1610–1677), was a notable Chinese philosopher during the late-Ming and early-Qing period.

== Biography ==
Pan was born in Cixi City, Ningbo, Zhejiang Province in late Ming dynasty in 1610. His courtesy name was Yongwei (用微).

During the Shunzhi Era, Pan lived in Shanying (Traditional/Simplified Chinese: 山陰/山阴; current Shaoxing), Zhejiang Province for ten years. Later Pan became a lecturer in Kunshan (昆山; current Suzhou), Jiangsu Province.

== Philosophy ==
Pan chronologically studied and inspected the philosophies of Cheng-Zhu, Lu-Wang, and Buddhist philosophy (especially the Zen buddhism). Pan discovered some subtle conflicts between these philosophical schools, and thought the Neo-confucianism developed in Song, Yuan and Ming dynasties were quite derivatives from the original thoughts or principles of Confucius and Mencius.

Pan criticized that Neo-confucianism mixed too much Zen buddhism, thus called those confucian scholars the "Monks of the Confucian Temple".

Pan considered that Cheng-Zhu School philosophically debated with Lu-Wang School is a kind of using Taoism to attack Buddhism (以老攻佛), and vice versa (以佛攻老).

Pan's philosophy was searching for the humanity (求仁), and he emphasized to search truth or true knowledge from daily living and practice. Pan proposed the theories of one integrated mass (渾然一體/浑然一体) and the sight from the true mind (見在真心/见在真心).

== Works ==
Books:

- Searching for Humanity (《求仁录》)
- Summary of Pan's Searching for Humanity (《潘子求仁录辑要》), 10 volumes, by his students
- Innovations of the Four Classics (《四书发明》) (The four classics stand for the Four Books of Confucianism, namely the Great Learning, the Doctrine of the Mean, the Analects of Confucius, and the Mencius)
- The Critique of Two Schools (《辨二氏之学》) (Two schools are two main Neo-confucian schools, the Cheng-Zhu School and the Lu-Wang School)

== Main references ==
- Biography of Pan Pingge, from Ningbo civic archive of Qing dynasty
- Brief Biography of Pan Pingge, from Huaxia.com

Papers:

- Religious Dimension of the Xiaojing Discourse in the Late Ming, by Miaw-fen Lu
- On Pan Pingge's Practical Ideology, by Pan Qizao
