= Wang Fuzhi =

Chinese philosopher (1619–1692)

- 王夫之
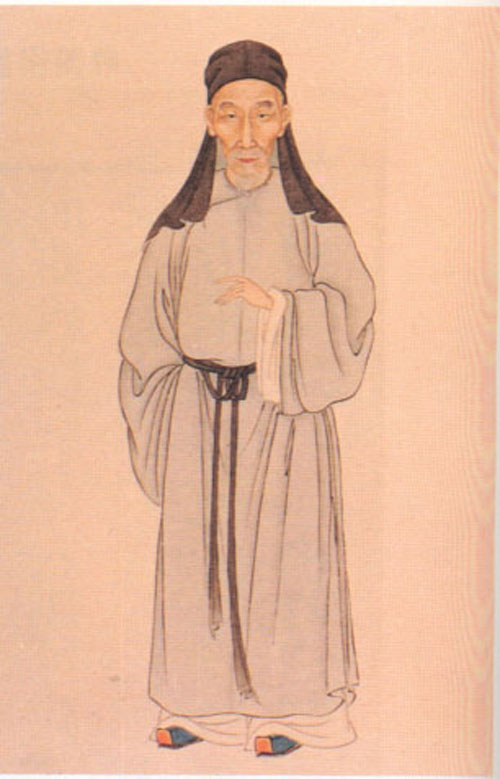
- Wang Fuzhi.
- Born: 7 October 1619; Hengyang, Hunan, Ming China
- Died: 18 February 1692 (aged 72); Hengyang, Hunan, Qing China
- Occupations: Historian; essayist; philosopher
- Notable work: Chuanshan yishu quanji
- Movement: Anti-Qing sentiment
- Children: Wang Ban (son); Wang Yu (son)
- Parent(s): Wang Zhaoping; Tan Ruren

Chinese name
- Chinese: 王夫之
Transcriptions
Standard Mandarin
- Hanyu Pinyin: Wáng Fūzhī
- Wade–Giles: Wang Fu-chih

Zizhan
- Traditional Chinese: 而農
- Simplified Chinese: 而农
Transcriptions
Standard Mandarin
- Hanyu Pinyin: Érnóng

Jiangzhai
- Traditional Chinese: 薑齋
- Simplified Chinese: 姜斋
Transcriptions
Standard Mandarin
- Hanyu Pinyin: Jiāngzhaī

Xitang
- Chinese: 夕堂
Transcriptions
Standard Mandarin
- Hanyu Pinyin: Xītáng

Wang Fuzhi (Chinese: 王夫之; pinyin: Wáng Fūzhī; Wade–Giles: Wang^{2} Fu^{1}-chih^{1}; 1619–1692), courtesy name Ernong (而農), pseudonym Chuanshan (船山), was a Chinese essayist, historian, and philosopher of the late Ming and early Qing dynasties.

== Life ==
Born to a scholarly family in Hengyang in Hunan province in 1619, Wang Fuzhi began his education in the Chinese classic texts when very young. He passed his civil-service examination at the age of twenty-four, but his projected career was diverted by the invasion of China by the Manchus, the founders of the Qing dynasty.

Staying loyal to the Ming emperors, Wang first fought against the invaders, and then spent the rest of his life in hiding from them. His refuge was at the foot of the mountain Chuanshan, from which he gained his alternative name). He died in 1693, though it is not known for certain where or how.

== Philosophical work ==
Wang Fuzhi is said to have written over a hundred books, but many of them have been lost. The rest of his works have been collected in the Chuanshan yishu quanji (船山遺書全集). He also wrote a commentary on Zizhi Tongjian, titled "Comments after reading the Tongjian" (讀通鑒論, "Du Tongjian Lun").

Wang was a follower of Confucius, but he believed that the neo-Confucian philosophy which dominated China at the time had distorted Confucius's teachings. He wrote his own commentaries on the Confucian classics (including five on the Yijing or Book of Changes), and gradually developed his own philosophical system. He wrote on many topics, including metaphysics, epistemology, moral philosophy, poetry, and politics. Apart from Confucius, he was also influenced by the prominent early Song dynasty neo-Confucians Zhang Zai and Zhu Xi.

=== Metaphysics ===
Wang's metaphysics is a version of materialism. He argued that only qi (氣 or ch'i; energy or material force) exists; li (理, principle, form, or idea), which was the central concept in the orthodox neo-Confucian thought of Zhu Xi, for example, doesn't exist independently, being simply the principle of qi. In this his metaphysics represents a continuation and development of that of Zhang Zai, as expressed most clearly in his Commentary on Master Zhang's Correcting Ignorance, and has also been highly regarded as a 'proto-materialist' in the Marxist period in the PRC after 1949.

=== Ethics ===
Wang's metaphysical ideas led him to a naturalist moral philosophy (precipitating a revival of interest in his teachings in modern China). In particular, he believed that human desires are not inherently evil, but in fact unavoidable and an essential part of our nature. Indeed, he believed that desires are potentially beneficial, the moral nature of human beings being grounded in our feelings for others, and that problems only arise through lack of moderation. Wang believed that human desires are the main evidence of our relationship with the material world as material beings, and that human nature develops out of our initial material nature together with the changes that we undergo as a result of our interactions with the world we live in.

=== Epistemology ===
Wang laid great stress on the need for both experience and reason: we must study the world using our senses, and reason carefully about it. Knowledge and action are intertwined, and acting is the ground of knowing. The gaining of knowledge is a slow and laborious process, there are no instances of sudden enlightenment.

=== Politics and History ===
Even more than his materialism, Wang's views on politics and history brought him popularity in modern China. Government, he argued, should benefit the people, not those in power. History is a continuous cycle of renewal, involving the gradual progress of human society. There are periods of chaos and want as well as of stability and prosperity, depending on the degree of virtue of the emperor and of the people as a whole, but the underlying direction is upwards. It's the result of the natural laws that govern human beings and society. Wang believed that the power of the feudal landlords was evil, and should be weakened by higher taxation, which would also lead to an increase in numbers of land-owning peasants.

What is meant by the Way [Dao] is the management of concrete things. [...] Lao-zi was blind to this and said that the Way existed in emptiness [...] Buddha was blind to this and said that the Way existed in silence [...] One may keep on uttering such extravagant words endlessly, but no-one can ever escape from concrete things.
(Ch’uan-shan i-shu)

Wang adopted a strong anti-Manchu stance in his writings and was remarkable for his systematic attempt to express his anti-Manchuism in a broad historical and philosophical context. He also insisted that the Chinese be distinguished from the non-Chinese, as both should stay in their own territories and respect the sovereignty of one another, in order to avoid the possibility of invasion or integration.

Along with his Confucian thought, he also recognized a "need to operate the system", associated with Chinese Legalism.

== See also ==
- Chinese philosophy
- Confucianism
- Anti-Qing sentiment
