= Zhang Zai =

Chinese philosopher, essayist, politician, writer, and cosmologist (1020–1077)

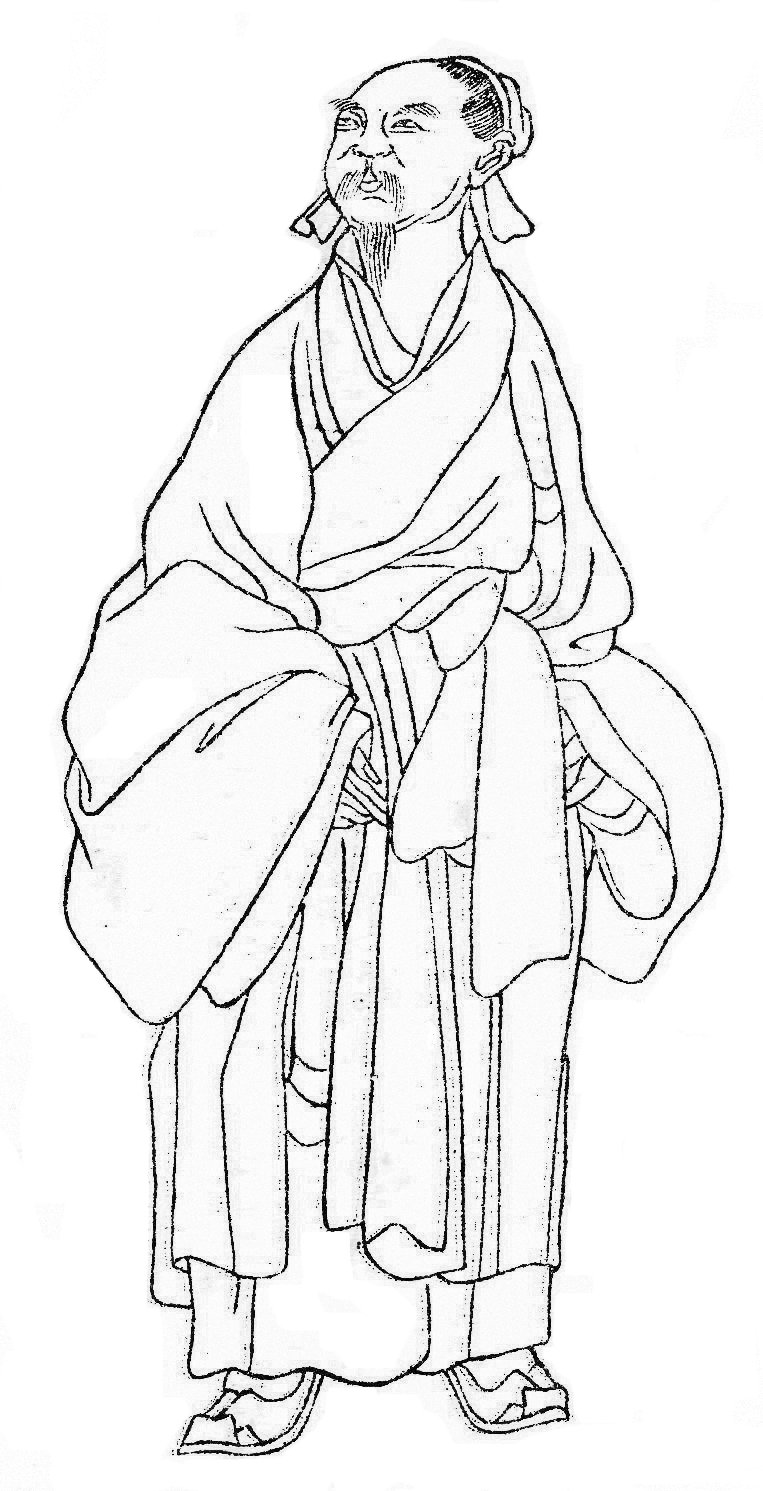
Zhang Zai

Zhang Zai (simplified Chinese: 张载; traditional Chinese: 張載; pinyin: Zhāng Zài; Wade–Giles: Chang Tsai) (1020–1077) was a Chinese philosopher and politician. He is best known for laying out four ontological goals for intellectuals: to build up the manifestations of Heaven and Earth's spirit, to build up good life for the populace, to develop past sages' endangered scholarship, and to open up eternal peace.

== Life and work ==
Zhang Zai was born in 1020 CE in Hengqu, in the province of Shaanxi. During his childhood he showed an interest in military affairs, but began to study the Confucian texts. Like many Song philosophers, Zhang was initially frustrated with Confucian thought and studied Buddhism along with Daoism for a number of years. But he decided that "The Way" could not be found in Buddhism or Daoism and returned to Confucian texts. His exploration of diverse religious thought had a major impact on his own ideals. In 1056 CE Zhang lectured on the Classic of Changes, which is one of his most best known works. It is possible that around this time Zhang first met the Cheng brothers. After passing the highest level of the civil service examinations, he held several minor government posts.

In 1069 CE Zhang's name was put forward to the Emperor and he was given a place in the government in the capital. However, not long after, he had a major disagreement with the prime minister and decided to retire to his home Hengqu, where he spent his time studying and teaching. This was likely the most productive period of his life as he developed and spread his philosophical views. In 1076 CE he finished his most significant work, Correcting Ignorance, and presented it to his disciples. Later in 1076 CE he was summoned back to the capital and restored to a high ranking position. However, in the winter he became sick and was forced to resign again. He never reached his home town of Hengqu, dying on the road in 1077 CE. Zhang was enshrined in the Confucian temple in 1241 CE for his work. Many of Zhang's writings have been lost. Zhu Xi collected selections of Zhang's writings in his anthology of Song Study of the Way known as Reflections on Things at Hand (zh:近思錄). His most important surviving works are probably his Commentary on the Changes and Correcting Ignorance.

After Zhang Zai's death most of his pupils became involved with the Cheng brothers' (Cheng Yi and Cheng Hao) school. Zhang Zai's thoughts and views became known for the most part through the efforts of the Cheng brothers and Zhu Xi. Zhu Xi honoured Zhang as one of the founders of the Study of the Way.

== Zhang Zai's philosophy ==
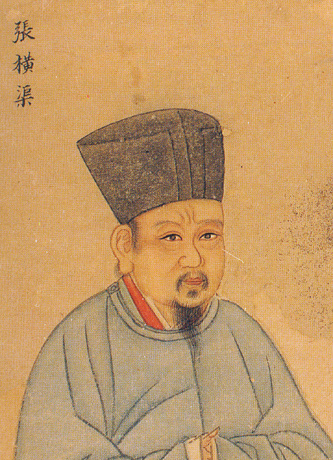
Zhang Zai (1020–1077)

=== The meaning and characteristics of Qi according to Zhang Zai ===
Zhang Zai's metaphysics is largely based on the Classic of Changes. According to Zhang, all things of the world are composed of a primordial substance called qi (also spelled chi). For Zhang, qi includes matter and the forces that govern interactions between matter, yin and yang. In its dispersed, rarefied state, qi is invisible and insubstantial, but when it condenses it becomes a solid or liquid and takes on new properties. All material things are composed of condensed qi: rocks, trees, even people. There is nothing that is not qi. Thus, in a real sense, everything has the same essence, an idea which has important ethical implications. The most significant contribution of Zhang Zai to Chinese philosophy is his belief in qi as the basis of his ontocosmology. The qi or vital force is, according to Zhang Zai, the fundamental substance by which all processes of the universe can be explained. First of all, according to Zhang Zai, the qi or vital force is something forever in the process of changing. Second, the perpetual change of the vital force follows a definite pattern of activity according to the two principles, the yin and yang. The changes undergone by qi result from the perpetual activity of the yin and yang principles. Zhang Zai's conclusion is that there is nothing in the universe that cannot be explained in terms of the interaction of the twofold activity of qi. Third, the change of anything from condensation to dispersion, or from visibility to invisibility does not imply the idea of quantitative extinction of the thing in question. Fourth, Zhang Zai stresses the fact that although the creation and transformation of manifold things can be reduced to one uniform pattern (the interaction of the yin and yang) nothing in the entire universe is the repetition of something else. As an example presented by Zhang Zai, there are no two persons whose minds are exactly alike. Fifth, the perpetual motion of the physical world is not originally caused by any outside force. He states that the cosmos depends on nothing to be its first mover, for the qi as such is a vital and self-moving force that alone makes all change and motion possible (Huang (1968)).

=== Zhang Zai's belief in human goodness ===
Neo-Confucians primarily valued Zhang Zai's doctrine of the sage "forming one body with the universe". This doctrine represents both the Confucian contiguity with its classical Confucian heritage and an enlargement of the Neo-Confucian system. At the centre of Zhang Zai's teaching is the idea of ren, humaneness or human-heartedness, in many ways the salient teaching of the classical Confucian tradition. This basic quality, which was for Confucius and Mencius the bond between human society and the ways of Heaven (tian) and hence fundamental to the underlying moral structure of the universe, was expanded by Zhang Zai to encompass the universe itself, since for the sage to form "one body with the universe" suggests the complementarity and fundamental identity of microcosm and macrocosm. The doctrine also illustrates Zhang Zai's belief in the fundamental goodness and purpose of the universe and in the potential of the individual to realise the ideal of the sage. In the teaching of "forming one body with the universe," Zhang Zai also claimed to distinguish Confucianism clearly from Buddhism and Daoism. For him the universe and its processes have a real existence. In turn, human life is looked upon as intrinsically valuable and ultimately the very foundation for the realisation of sagehood. For Zhang Zai, such a view is clearly distinguishable from Daoism and Buddhism, both of which require a radical departure from the universe as it is given in order to fulfil the soteriological quest. In Zhang Zai's terms, Daoism and Buddhism both emphasise escape from the world, while Confucianism finds fulfilment and ultimate identity precisely within the changes found in this world, a world of qi rather than of emptiness. The sage accepts the ultimate reality of qi and its inherent goodness, he acknowledges the infusion of ren throughout the very structure of the universe itself, and thus he can fulfil the ideal of the sage, "forming one body with the universe".

== Descendants ==
Zhang Zai's offspring held the title of Wujing Boshi (五经博士; 五經博士; Wǔjīng Bóshì).

In 1452 Wujing Boshi was bestowed upon the offspring of Mengzi-Meng Xiwen 孟希文 56th generation and Yan Hui-Yan Xihui 顔希惠 59th generation, the same was bestowed on the offspring of Zhou Dunyi-Zhou Mian 週冕 12th generation, the two Cheng brothers (Cheng Hao and Cheng Yi-Chen Keren 程克仁 17th generation), Zhu Xi-Zhu Ting 朱梴 (Zhu Chan?) 9th generation, in 1456–1457, in 1539 the same was awarded to Zeng Can's offspring-Zeng Zhicui 曾質粹 60th generation, in 1622 the offspring of Zhang Zai received the title and in 1630 the offspring of Shao Yong.

- Son, Zhang Yin 張因
- Grandson, Zhang Yan 張炎
- Fourth generation descendant, Zhang Xuan 張選- who followed Emperor Gaozong of Song to southern China.
- Fifth generation descendants, Zhang Jin張晉, Zhang Zhi 張智, and Zhang Yijun 張一俊.
- Sixth generation descendant, Zhang Ting 張霆
- Seventh generation descendant Zhang Riming 張日明
- Eighth generation descendant Zhang Gumian 張谷勉
- Ninth generation descendants Zhang Shirong, 張士榮, Zhang Shiming 張士名
- Tenth generation descendant Zhang Wenyun 張文運
