= Zhou Dunyi =

Chinese cosmologist, philosopher and writer (1017–1073)

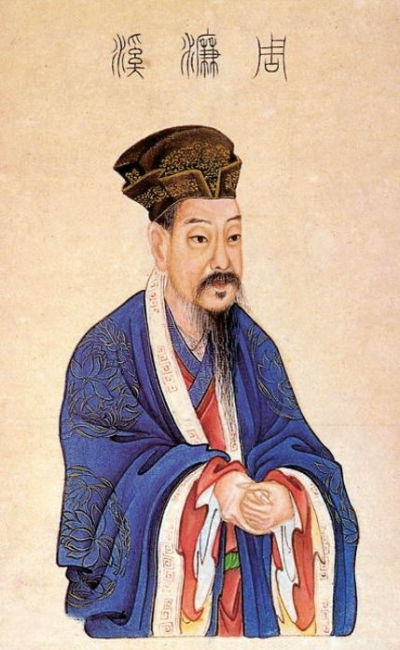
- Qing dynasty illustration of Zhou Dunyi from the reign of the Qianlong Emperor.
- Born: 1017
- Died: 1073 (age 56)
- Occupations: Cosmologist, philosopher, writer

Philosophical work
- Era: Neo-Confucianism
- Region: Chinese Philosophy
- School: Neo-Confucianism

Zhou Dunyi
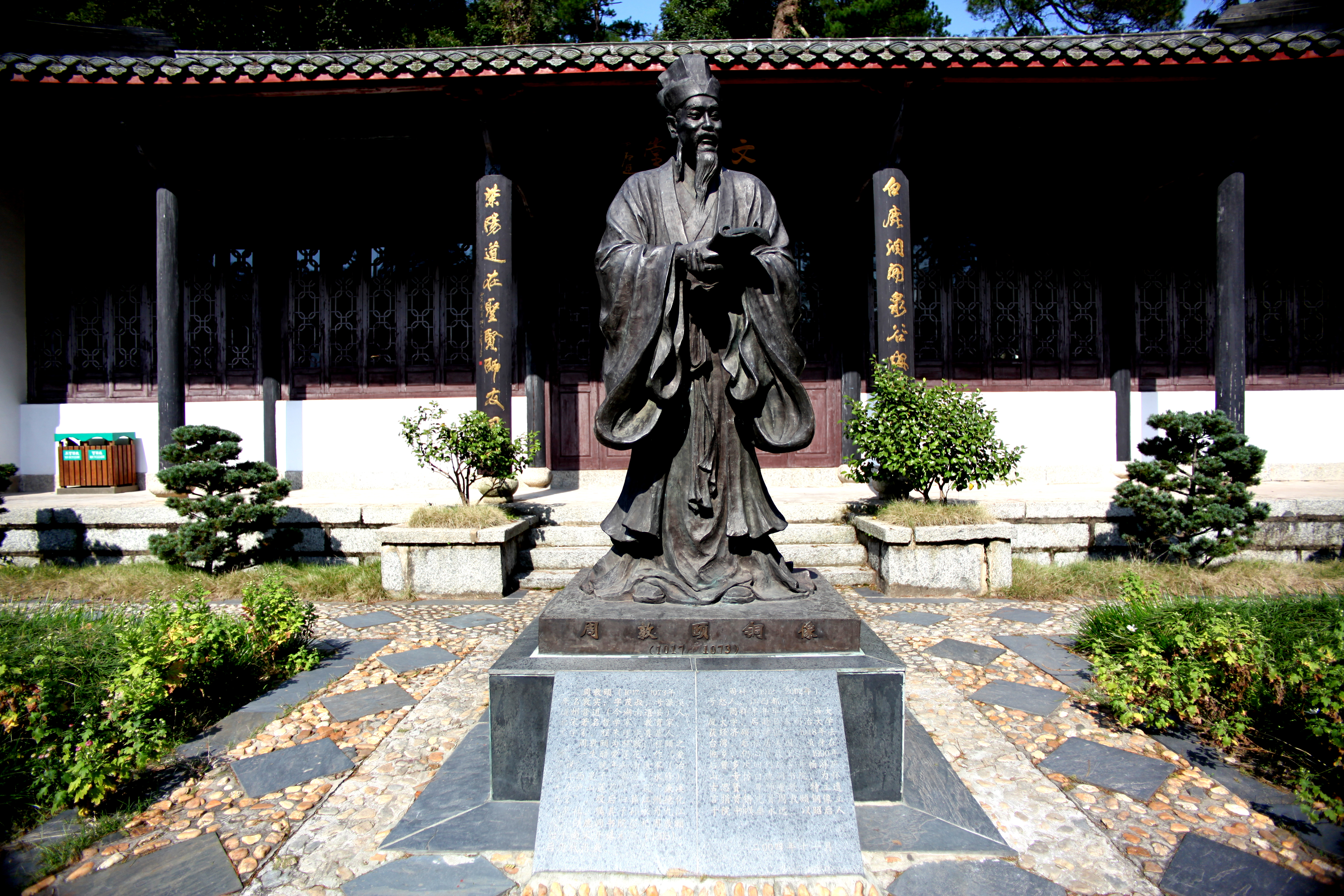
- Bronze statue of Zhou Dunyi at the White Deer Grotto Academy
- Traditional Chinese: 周敦頤
- Simplified Chinese: 周敦颐
Transcriptions
Standard Mandarin
- Hanyu Pinyin: Zhōu Dūnyí
- Wade–Giles: Chou Tun-i

Birth name
- Chinese: 周敦實
Transcriptions
Standard Mandarin
- Hanyu Pinyin: Zhōu Dūnshí

Courtesy name
- Chinese: 茂叔
Transcriptions
Standard Mandarin
- Hanyu Pinyin: Màoshū
- Wade–Giles: Mao-shu

Posthumous name
- Chinese: 周濂溪
Transcriptions
Standard Mandarin
- Hanyu Pinyin: Zhōu Liánxī
- Wade–Giles: Chou Lien-hsi

Zhou Dunyi (Chinese: 周敦頤; Wade–Giles: Chou Tun-i; 1017–1073) was a Chinese cosmologist, philosopher, and writer during the Song dynasty. He conceptualized the Neo-Confucian cosmology of the day, explaining the relationship between human conduct and universal forces. In this way, he emphasizes that humans can master their qi ("spirit") in order to accord with nature. He was a major influence to Zhu Xi, who was the architect of Neo-Confucianism. Zhou Dunyi was mainly concerned with Taiji (supreme polarity) and Wuji (limitless potential), the yin and yang, and the wu xing (the five phases).

== Life ==
Born in 1017 in Yingdao County, Daozhou prefecture, in present-day Yongzhou, southern Hunan, Zhou was originally named Zhou Dunshi. Raised by a scholar-official family, he changed his name in 1063 to avoid a character in the personal name of the new Emperor Yingzong.

His father died when he was fourteen and he was taken in by his uncle Zheng Xiang. He received his first posting in government through his uncle. Although very active in his civil service career, he never did achieve a high position or get the "Presented Scholar" degree (jinshi). Some of the positions that he held were district record keeper (1040), magistrate in various districts (1046–1054), prefectural staff supervisor, and professor of the directorate of education and assistant prefect (1061–1064). He resigned from his last post one year before he died. He died near Mount Lu in Jiangxi province in 1073. After his death, Zhou was commonly called Zhou Lianxi for a name he adopted in his retirement that honored the Lian stream near his home. He was nicknamed the "Poor Zen Fellow" by Cheng Yi and posthumously honored as the "Duke of Yuan" (Yuangong) in 1200.

== Descendants ==
Zhou Dunyi's offspring held the title of Wujing Boshi (五经博士; 五經博士; Wǔjīng Bóshì).

In 1452 the title of 'Wujing Boshi' was bestowed upon Meng Xiwen 孟希文, the 56th generation offspring of Mengzi and upon Yan Xihui 顔希惠, the 59th generation offspring of Yan Hui; in 1456-1457 the same was bestowed on Zhou Mian 週冕, the 12th generation offspring of Zhou Dunyi, on Chen Keren 程克仁, the 17th generation offspring of the Cheng brothers (Cheng Hao and Cheng Yi), in 1539 the same was awarded to Zeng Zhicui 曾質粹, the 60th generation offspring of Zeng Can; in 1622 an offspring of Zhang Zai received the title and in 1630 an offspring of Shao Yong.

== Writings ==
=== Taiji Tu Shuo ===
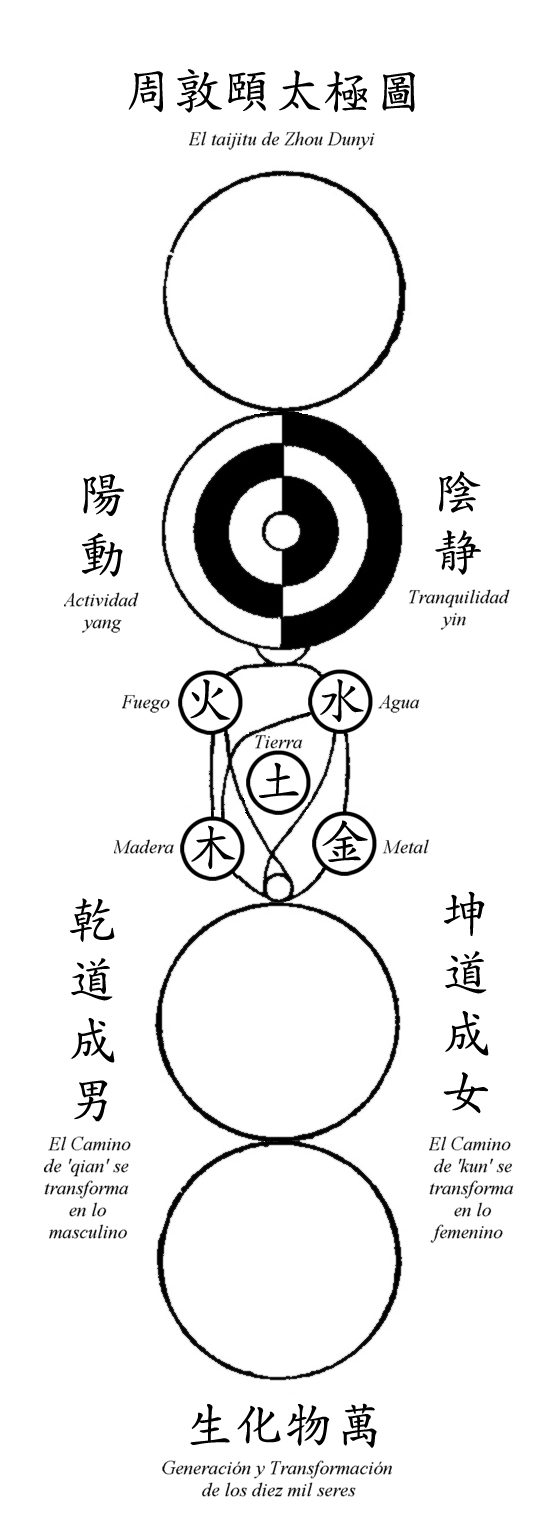
The Taijitu of Zhou Dunyi

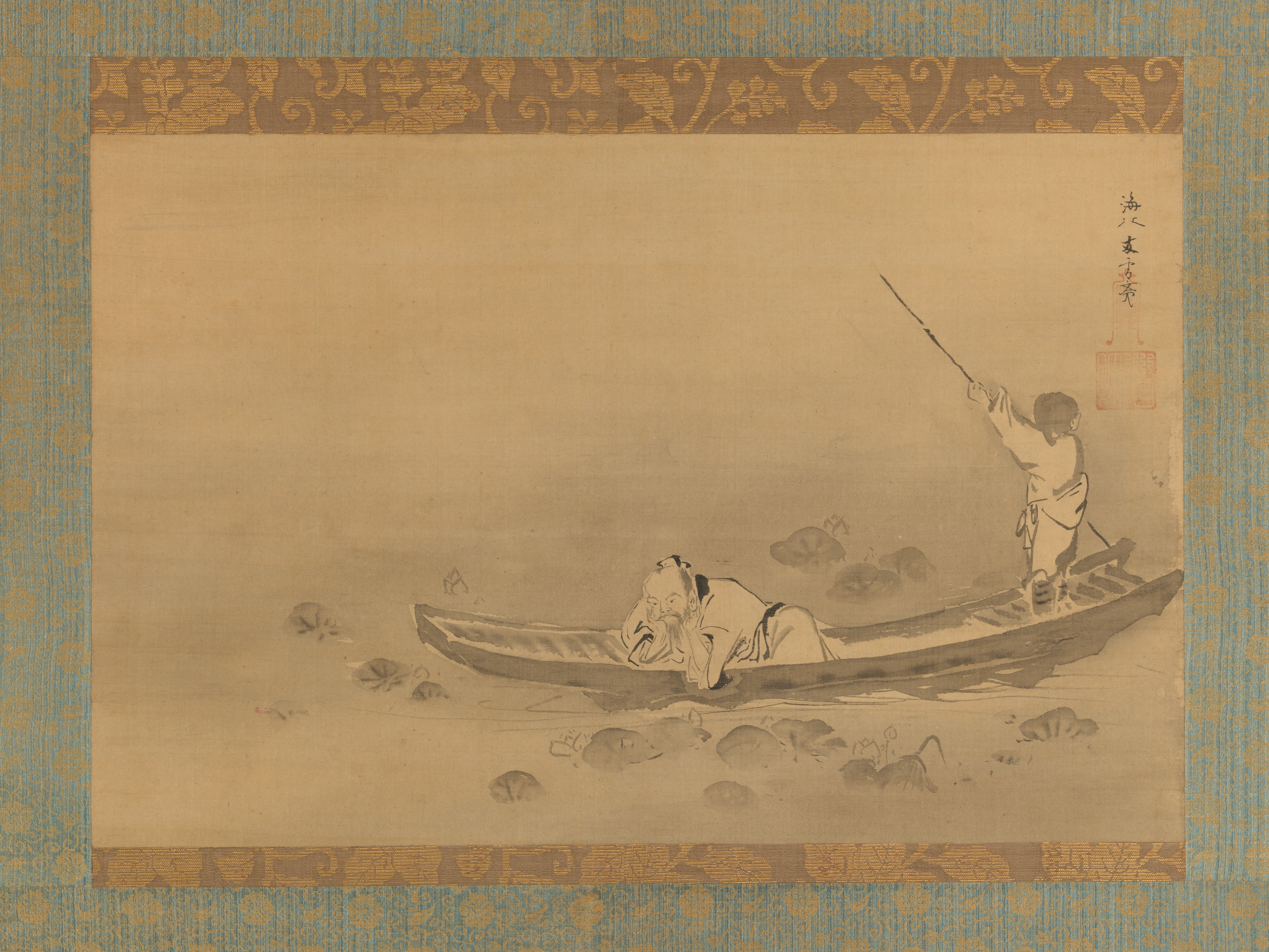
Zhou Dunyi admiring lotuses by Kaihō Yūsetsu, mid-17th century

The Taiji Tu Shuo (太極圖說, Explanations of the Diagram of the Supreme Ultimate or Diagram Explaining the Supreme Ultimate) was placed at the head of the neo-Confucian anthology Jinsilu (Reflections on Things at Hand) by Zhu Xi and Lü Zuqian in 1175. He fused Confucian ethics and concepts from the Book of Changes (I Ching) with Daoist naturalism. He developed a metaphysics based on the idea that "the many are ultimately one and the one is ultimate." This was the first 11th-century Chinese text to argue for the inseparability of metaphysics or cosmology and ethics, as well as the first major Chinese text to explore the concept of the taijitu or "yin-yang symbol".

It contained his theory of creation, which can be summarized in the following paraphrase of its first section:

"In the beginning, there was t'ai chi (taiji) (the great ultimate of being), which was fundamentally identical with wu chi (wuji) (the ultimate of non-being). Because of the abundance of energy within t'ai chi, it began to move and thus produced the yang (the positive cosmic force). When the activity of the yang reached its limit, it reverted to tranquility. Through tranquility the yin (the negative cosmic force) was generated. When tranquility reached its limit, it returned to movement (yang). Thus yin and yang generated each other. Then, through the union of the yin and the yang the transformation of both, the five agents (or elements) of metal, wood, water, fire and earth were brought into being. These five agents are conceived of as material principles rather than as concrete things. They can therefore be considered the common basis of all things. The interaction of the yin and yang through different combinations of the five agents generates all things in a process of endless transformation."

Zhou Dunyi postulated that human beings receive all these qualities and forces in their higher excellence and, hence, are the most intelligent of all creatures. He also believed that the five agents corresponded directly to the five moral principles of ren (humanity), yi (righteousness), li (propriety), zhi (wisdom), and xin (faithfulness).

=== Tong Shu ===
The Tong Shu (The All-Embracing Book or Penetrating the 'Book of Changes) was a reinterpretation of the Confucian doctrines. It was the basis for ethics in neo-Confucianism. It stated that the sage is a superior man who acts in accordance with the principles of propriety, humanity, righteousness, wisdom, faithfulness, tranquility and sincerity. Sincerity being the basis for moral nature, it can be used to distinguish between good and evil and to perfect oneself.

It spoke of principle, nature, and destiny together, which became three cardinal concepts of Confucian thought. He had a Daoist perspective toward nature. There are stories of Zhou Dunyi loving his grass so much that he would not cut it, reinforcing the concept that humans should appreciate life in nature and the importance of non-action. Zhou Dunyi is known to have said that the best quality of life is that of a pure lotus growing out of dirty waters, where the lotus is the natural equivalent of the noble person. He is known for pulling many ideas from Daoism, Buddhism and Confucianism.

== School ==
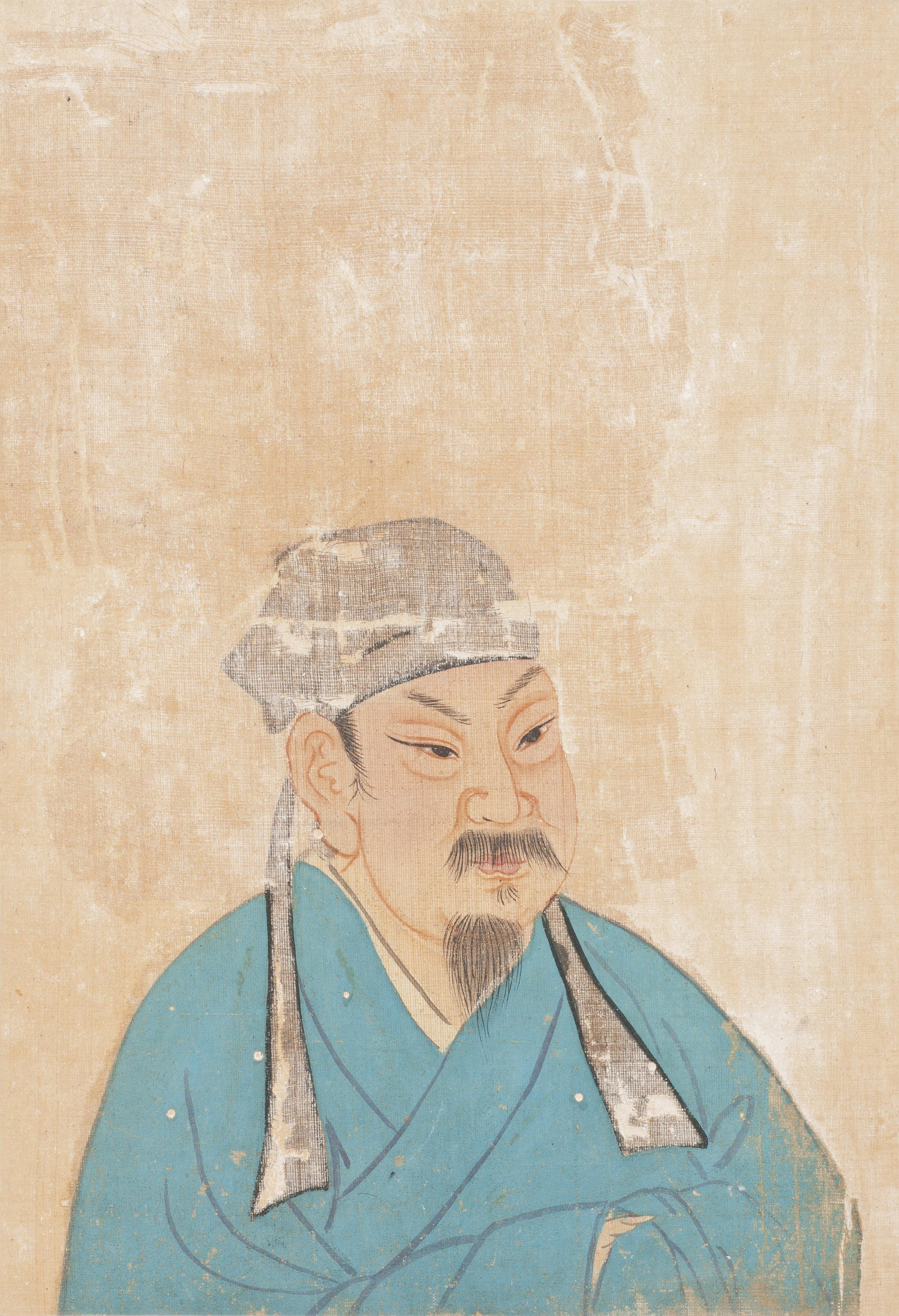
As depicted in the album Portraits of Famous Men c. 1900, housed in the Philadelphia Museum of Art

Zhou Dunyi had two students who made major contributions to Confucianism: his nephews Cheng Yi and Cheng Hao. The Cheng brothers studied under Zhou Dunyi only for a short time when they were younger. The brothers moved on to establish the Cheng-Zhu School, which dominated Chinese philosophy for over 700 years. Zhou Dunyi is considered the founding father of that school although there are no references in the Cheng brothers' writings to his contributions.

Zhou Dunyi was a major influence on Zhu Xi, who was considered one of the greatest Confucian thinkers since Confucius himself. Zhu Xi was known to have said that Zhou Dunyi was the first great sage of the Song dynasty, particularly for his emphasis on the concept of Wuji.

Though he never had much influence during his lifetime, he was remembered as warm, humane, and kin with the natural world. Many Confucians believed that he embodied the virtue of "authenticity". He had great insight into the Way of Heaven. The first major popularization of the taijitu symbol is also credited to Zhou Dunyi; this symbol (in an altered form) is now known worldwide as the commonly accepted symbol for the Chinese concepts of yin and yang.

== See also ==
- Vase with Poet Zhou Dunyi

== Sources ==
- Adler, Joseph A. "Zhou Dunyi: The Metaphysics and Practice of Sagehood". In Wm. Theodore de Bary and Irene Bloom, eds., Sources of Chinese Tradition, 2nd ed., vol. 1 (NY: Columbia University Press, 1999), ch. 20.
- Adler, Joseph A. ''Reconstructing the Confucian Dao: Zhu Xi's Appropriation of Zhou Dunyi, (Albany: State University of New York Press, 2014).
- Arrington, R. (1999). A Companion to the Philosophers. Massachusetts, Blackwell Publishers Ltd.
- Berthrong, J (1998). Transformations of the Confucian Way. Boulder, Westview Press.
- Chan, Wing-tsit (1986). Neo-Confucian Terms Explained. New York, Columbia University Press.
- Chen, Keming and Weng, Jindun "Zhou Dunyi". Encyclopedia of China (Philosophy Edition), 1st ed.
- Gedalecia, D (1974). "Excursion Into Substance and Function." Philosophy East and West. vol. 4, 443–451.
- Yao Xinzhong (2003). Encyclopedia of Confucianism, 1st ed. London, RoutledgeCurzon.
- "Zhou Dunyi." Encyclopædia Britannica. 2008. Encyclopædia Britannica Online. 17 Oct. 2008 Britannica Academic
