= Li (neo-Confucianism) =

Concept in Neo-Confucian Chinese philosophy

Li (Chinese: 理; pinyin: lǐ) is a concept found in neo-Confucian Chinese philosophy. It refers to the underlying reason and order of nature as reflected in its organic forms.

It may be translated as "rational principle", "law", or "organisational rights". It was central to Zhu Xi's integration of Buddhism into Confucianism. Zhu Xi held that li, together with qi (氣: vital, material force), depend on each other to create structures of nature and matter. The sum of li is the Taiji.

This idea resembles the Buddhist notion of li, which also means "principle or ritual". Zhu Xi maintained, however, that his notion is found in the I Ching (Book of Changes), a classic source of Chinese philosophy. Zhu Xi's school came to be known as the School of Li, which is comparable to rationalism. To an even greater extent than Confucius, Zhu Xi had a naturalistic world-view. His world-view contained two primary ideas: qi and li. Zhu Xi further believed that the conduct of the two of these took place according to the organisational principles of Yin and Yang.

Holding to Confucius and Mencius' conception of humanity as innately good, Zhu Xi articulated an understanding of li as the basic pattern of the universe, stating that it was understood that one could not live without li and live an exemplary life. Wang Yangming, a philosopher who opposed Zhu Xi's ideas, held that li was to be found not in the world but within oneself. Wang Yangming was thus more of an idealist with a different epistemic approach. However, in the practice of traditional Chinese medicine, the endogenous and exogenous interpretations of these two philosophical ideas are not seen as mutually exclusive but are viewed, to create and control each other.

== Chinese medicine ==
Li is well known and understood in the study, practice, and application of Traditional Chinese Medicine.

The Huangdi Neijing (Chinese: 黃帝內經; pinyin: Huángdì Nèijīng), meaning the Inner Canon of the Yellow Emperor, is the most important ancient text for the study of Medical and Daoist theory and lifestyle.

== Laozi and Zhuangzi ==
The Tao te Ching does not contain the character Li 理. The Zhuangzi does, discussing the principle of heaven and myriad things. But not as an underlying natural principle; the Zhunagzi believes that things exhaust themselves, or harmonize with the Dao.

== See also ==
- Indra's Net
- Traditional Chinese Medicine
- Wuxing
- Chan Buddhism
- Confucianism
- Taoism
