= Cheng brothers =

Cheng brothers

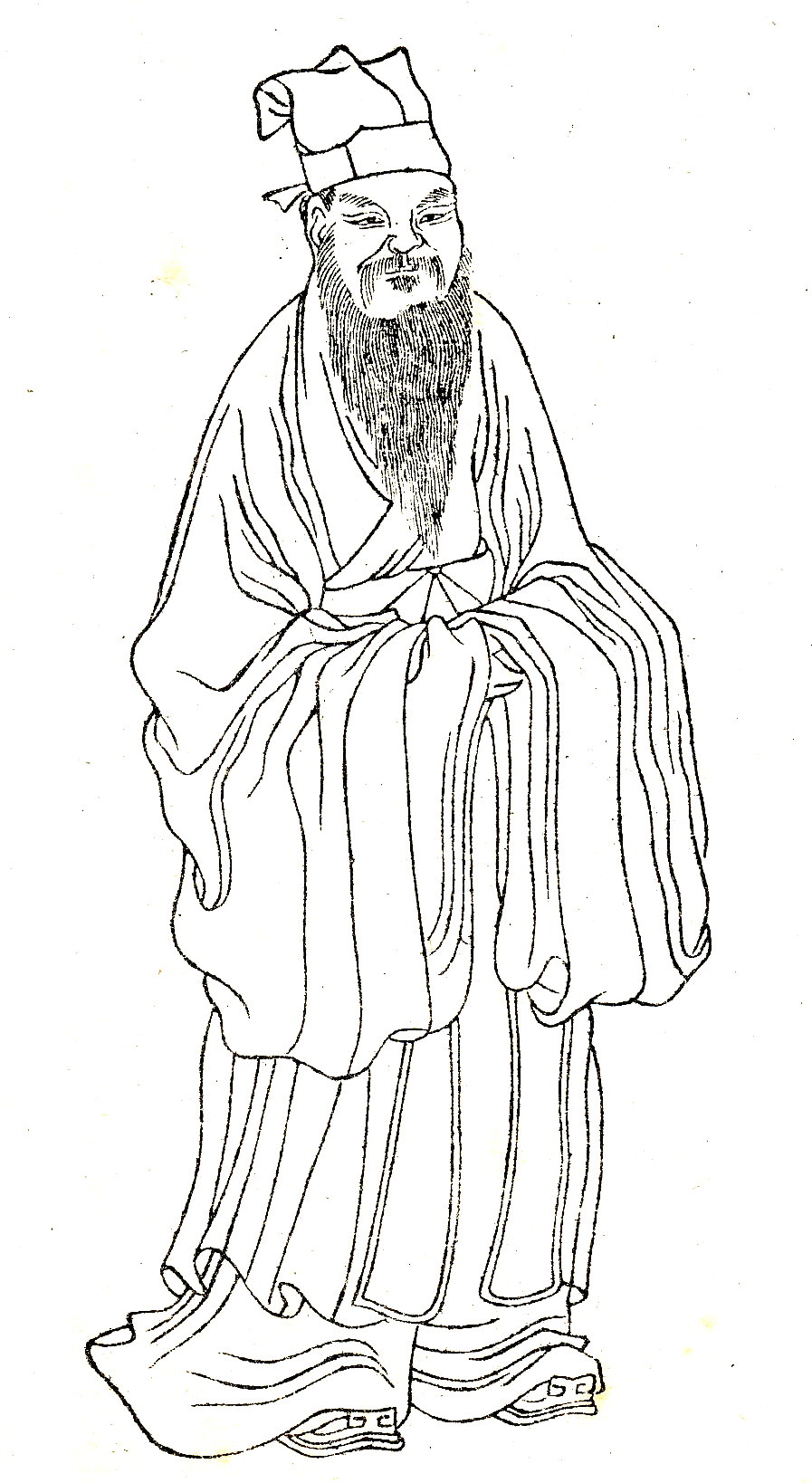
Cheng Hao

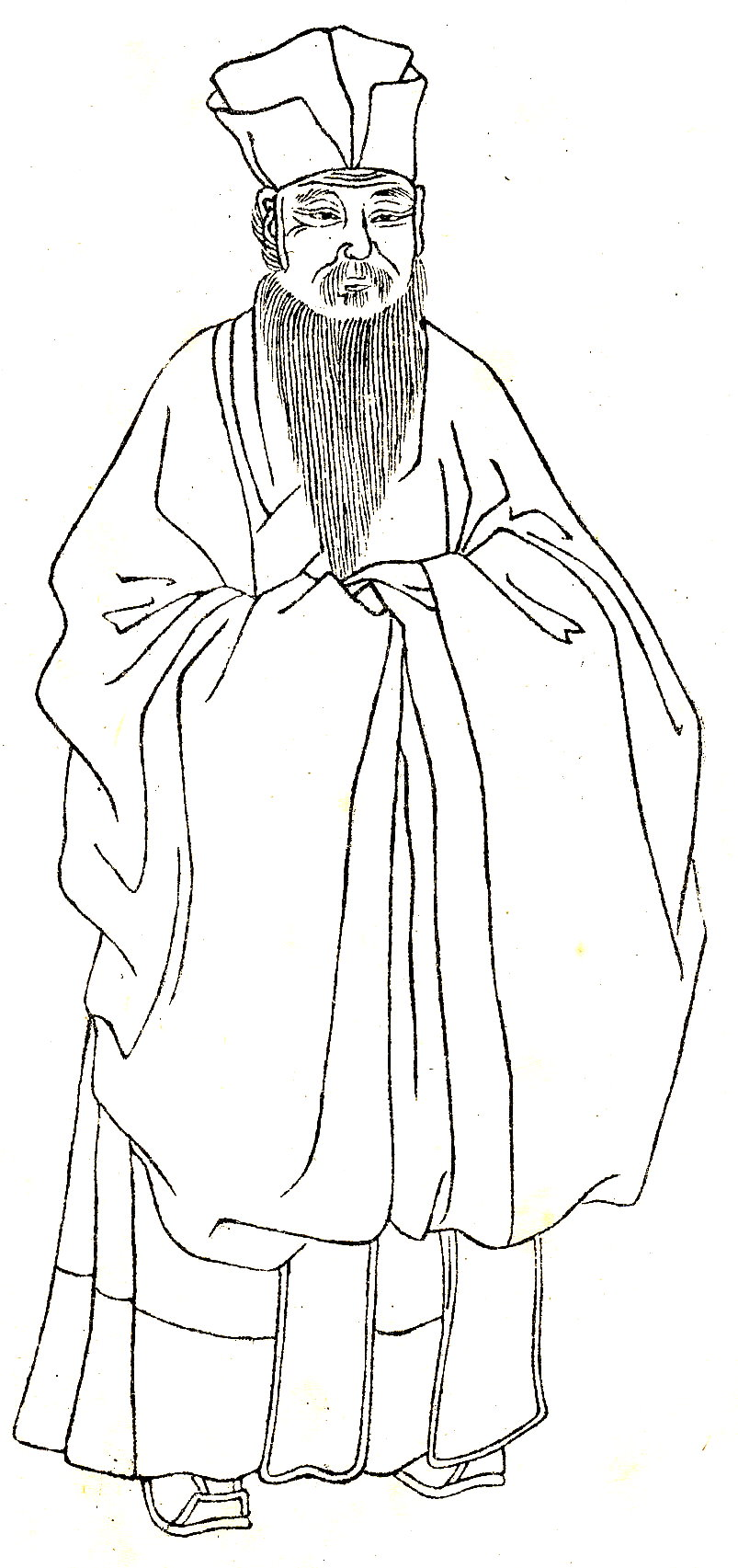
Cheng Yi

The Cheng brothers (Er Cheng, 二程, lit 2 Chengs) were two brothers Cheng Hao and Cheng Yi who were prominent Confucian philosophers during the Song dynasty.

== Scholarship ==
In their early years the Cheng brothers studied under Zhou Dunyi and developed the science of nature from Mencius to Zhou Dunyi in Philosophy, establishing a system of science centered on the "Divine Principle". The most important academic proposition of the brothers is that "everything is just a heavenly principle.

== Differences ==
Cheng Hao is lively and natural, but Cheng Yi is serious and upright, sacred and inviolable, and even inhumane, which is the "face of Taoism" seen in later generations. In terms of Women Chastity, Cheng Yi thought, "...... If you take someone who is out of line to match your body, you are out of line. The first thing that I did was to ask Cheng Yi: "Widowhood is poor and helpless, can she remarry? Some people are afraid of freezing to death and starving to death, so they use the cold and hunger as an excuse.，As the standard for measuring the virtuous ladies. Zhu Xi (1130–1200) also agreed with this statement in his "Letter to Chen Shizhong": "In the past, Mr. Ichuan tried to discuss this matter, thinking that starving to death is a small matter, but losing modesty is a big matter. But when viewed by a gentleman who knows the scriptures and understands reason, he can see that it is not easy. He advocated that women should "be devoted to one another" and suppress "human desire".

== See also ==
- Cheng-Zhu school

== Bibliography ==
- 葛瑞漢（A. C. Graham）著，程德祥等譯：《中國的兩位哲學家：二程兄弟的新儒學》
