= Zhu Xi =

Chinese philosopher (1130–1200)

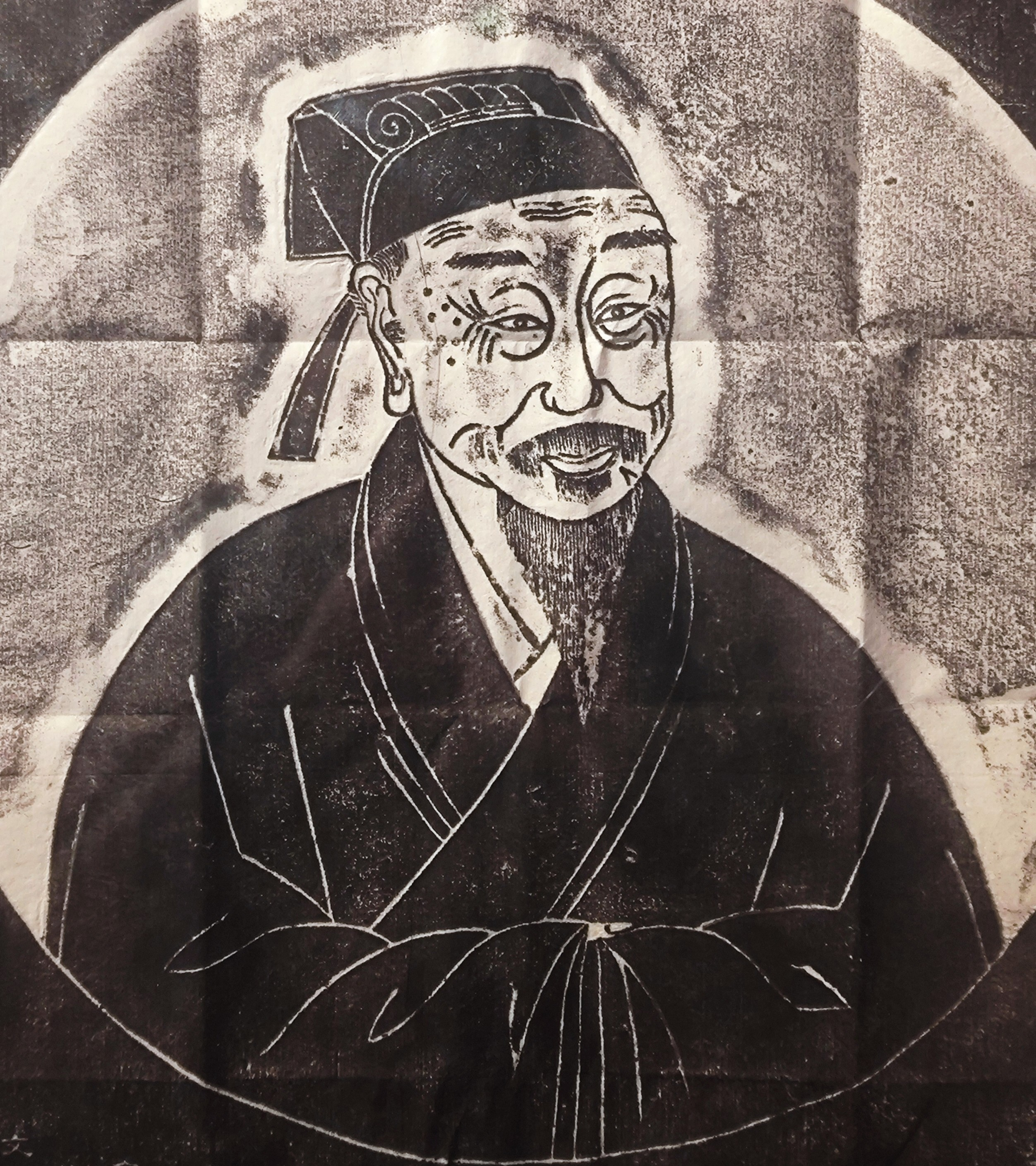
- A portrait of Zhu Xi preserved by his descendants, 1190s (re-engraved 1723–1735; 20th-century rubbing)
- Born: October 18, 1130; Youxi, Fujian Circuit, Southern Song dynasty
- Died: April 23, 1200 (aged 69)
- Occupations: Calligrapher, historian, philosopher, poet, politician

Philosophical work
- Era: Medieval philosophy
- Region: Chinese philosophy
- School: Neo-Confucianism

Chinese name
- Chinese: 朱熹
Transcriptions
Standard Mandarin
- Hanyu Pinyin: Zhū Xī
- Bopomofo: ㄓㄨ ㄒㄧ
- Wade–Giles: Chu^{1} Hsi^{1}
- Tongyong Pinyin: Jhu Si
- IPA: [ʈʂú ɕí]
Yue: Cantonese
- Yale Romanization: Jyū Hēi
- Jyutping: Zyu1 hei1
- IPA: [tsy˥ hej˥]
Southern Min
- Tâi-lô: Tsu Hi
Middle Chinese
- Middle Chinese: tʃju hji

Alternative Chinese name
- Chinese: 朱子
- Literal meaning: "Master Zhu"
Transcriptions
Standard Mandarin
- Hanyu Pinyin: Zhūzǐ
- Bopomofo: ㄓㄨ ㄗˇ
- Wade–Giles: Chu^{1}-tzu^{3}
- Tongyong Pinyin: Jhu-zǐh
- IPA: [ʈʂú.tsɹ̩̀]
Yue: Cantonese
- Yale Romanization: Jyū-jí
- Jyutping: Zyu1 zi2
- IPA: [tsy˥ tsi˧˥]
Southern Min
- Tâi-lô: Tsu-tzú

Statue of Zhu Xi at the White Deer Grotto Academy at the foot of Mount Lu

Zhu Xi (Chinese: 朱熹; [ʈʂú ɕí]; October 18, 1130 – April 23, 1200), formerly romanized Chu Hsi, was a Chinese philosopher, historian, politician, poet, and calligrapher of the Southern Song dynasty. As a leading figure in the development of Neo-Confucianism, Zhu Xi played a pivotal role in shaping the intellectual foundations of later imperial China. He sought to integrate moral self-cultivation, classical interpretation, ritual practice, and cosmological theory into a coherent framework, emphasizing disciplined study and ethical cultivation while criticizing approaches—particularly within contemporary Buddhist traditions—that claimed immediate insight detached from ritual, learning, and moral practice. His extensive commentaries and editorial work on the Four Books became the core texts of the imperial civil service examinations from 1313 until their abolition in 1905. He advanced a rigorous philosophical methodology known as the "investigation of things" (格物) and emphasized meditation as an essential practice for moral and intellectual self-cultivation. Zhu Xi's thought exerted profound influence, becoming the official state ideology of China from the Yuan dynasty onward, and was later adopted in other East Asian countries such as Japan, Korea, and Vietnam. In these regions, his Neo-Confucian doctrines were institutionalized through educational systems and civil service examinations, shaping political ideologies, social hierarchies, and cultural values for centuries.

Zhu was a scholar with a wide learning in the classics, commentaries, histories and other writings of his predecessors. In his lifetime, he was able to serve multiple times as a government official, although he avoided public office for most of his adult life. He also wrote, compiled and edited almost a hundred books and corresponded with dozens of other scholars. He acted as a teacher to groups of students, many of whom chose to study under him for years. He built upon the teachings of the Cheng brothers and others, further developing their metaphysical theories in regards to Li (Forma) and Qi (Materia). His followers recorded thousands of his conversations in writing.

== Life ==
Zhu Xi, whose family originated in Wuyuan County, Huizhou (in modern Jiangxi province), was born in Fujian, where his father worked as the subprefectural sheriff. After his father was forced from office due to his opposition to the government appeasement policy towards the Jurchen in 1140, Zhu Xi received instruction from his father at home. Many anecdotes attest that he was a highly precocious child. It was recorded that at age five he ventured to ask what lay beyond Heaven, and by eight he understood the significance of the Classic of Filiality (Xiaojing). As a youth, he was inspired by Mencius' proposition that anyone could become a sage. Upon his father's death in 1143, he studied with his father's friends Hu Xian, Liu Zihui, and Liu Mianzhi. In 1148, at the age of 19, Zhu Xi passed the Imperial Examination and became a presented scholar (jinshi). Zhu Xi's first official dispatch position was as Subprefectural Registrar of Tong'an (同安縣主簿), which he served from 1153 - 1156. From 1153 he began to study under Li Tong, who followed the Neo-Confucian tradition of Cheng Hao and Cheng Yi, and formally became his student in 1160.

In 1179, after not serving in an official capacity since 1156, Zhu Xi was appointed Prefect of Nankang Military District (南康軍), where he revived White Deer Grotto Academy. and got demoted three years later for attacking the incompetency and corruption of some influential officials. There were several instances of receiving an appointment and subsequently being demoted. Upon dismissal from his last appointment, he was accused of numerous crimes and a petition was made for his execution. Much of this opposition was headed by Han Tuozhou, the Prime Minister, who was a political rival of Zhu's. Even though his teachings had been severely attacked by establishment figures, almost a thousand brave people attended his funeral. After the death of Han Tuozhou, Zhu's successor Zhen Dexiu, together with Wei Liaoweng, made Zhu's branch of Neo-Confucianism the dominant philosophy at the Song Court.

In 1208, eight years after his death, Emperor Ningzong of Song rehabilitated Zhu Xi and honored him with the posthumous name of Wen Gong (文公), meaning "Venerable gentleman of culture". Around 1228, Emperor Lizong of Song honored him with the posthumous noble title Duke of Hui (徽國公). In 1241, a memorial tablet to Zhu Xi was placed in the Confucian Temple at Qufu, thereby elevating him to Confucian sainthood. Today, Zhu Xi is venerated as one of the "Twelve Philosophers" of Confucianism. Modern Sinologists and Chinese often refer to him as Zhu Wen Gong (朱文公) in lieu of his name.

== Teachings ==
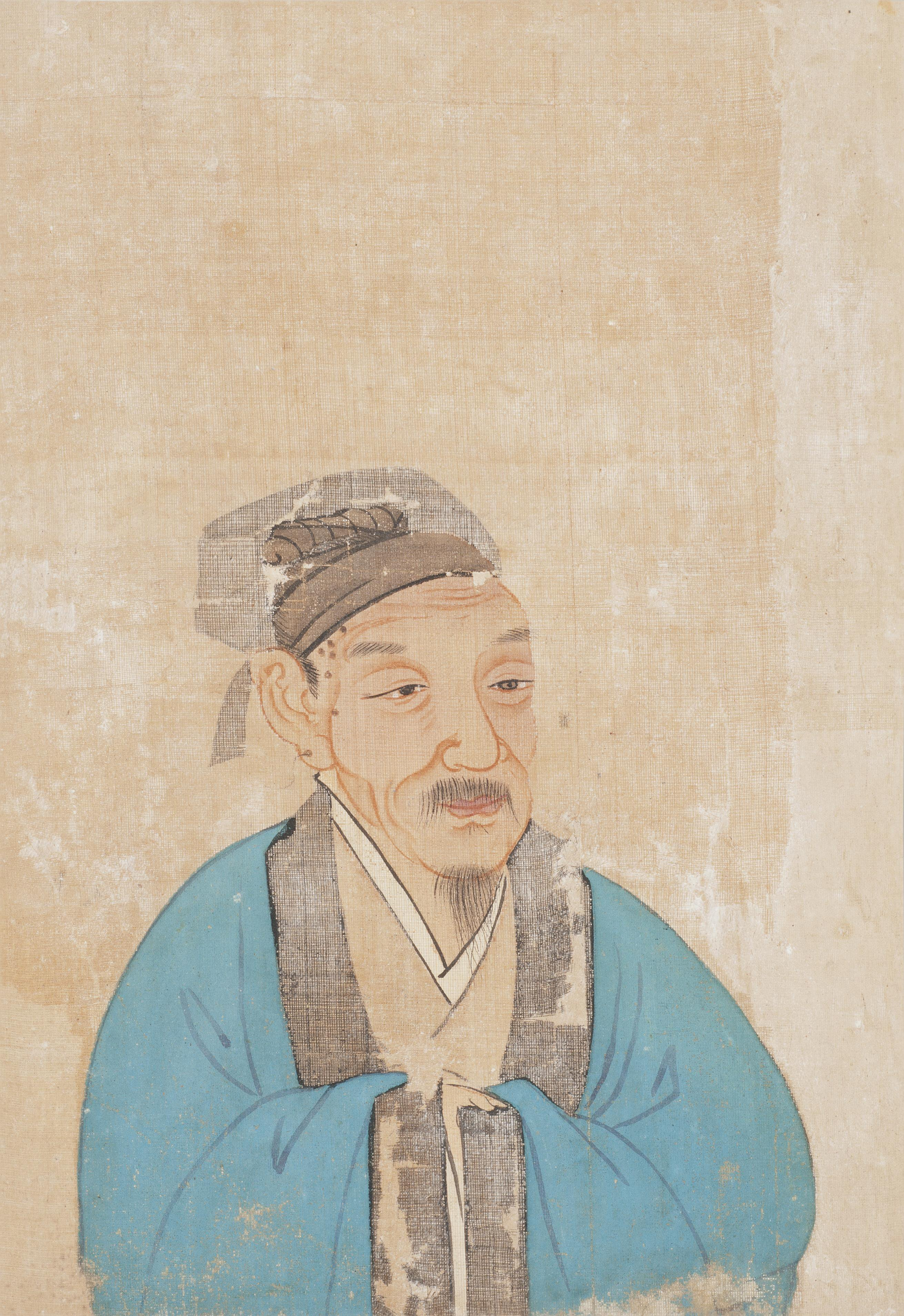
As depicted in the album Portraits of Famous Men c. 1900, housed in the Philadelphia Museum of Art.

=== The Four Books ===
During the Song dynasty, Zhu Xi's teachings were considered to be unorthodox. Rather than focusing on the I Ching like other Neo-Confucians, he chose to emphasize the Four Books: the Great Learning, the Doctrine of the Mean, the Analects of Confucius, and the Mencius as the core curriculum for aspiring scholar officials. For all these classics he wrote extensive commentaries that were not widely recognized in his time; however, they later became accepted as the standard commentaries. The Four Books served as the basis of civil service examinations up until 1905, and education in the classics often began with Zhu Xi's commentaries as the cornerstone for understanding them.

The sources of Zhu Xi's new approach to the Confucian curriculum have been found in several works of the Cheng brothers. Zhu Xi "codified the Cheng brothers' teachings and reworked them into his own philosophical program," moving "from philology to philosophy."

=== Li, Qi, and the Supreme Ultimate ===
Zhu Xi maintained that all things are brought into being by the union of two universal aspects of reality: qi (氣, sometimes translated as vital – or physical, material – force); and li (理, sometimes translated as rational principle or law). The source and sum of li is the taiji, meaning the Supreme Ultimate. The source of qi is not so clearly stated by Zhu Xi, leading some authorities to maintain that he was a metaphysical monist and others to maintain that he was a metaphysical dualist.

According to Zhu Xi's theory, every physical object and every person has its li and therefore has contact in its metaphysical core with the taiji. What is referred to as the human soul, mind, or spirit is understood as the taiji, or the supreme creative principle, as it works its way out in a person.

Qi and li operate together in mutual dependence. They are mutually aspective in all creatures in the universe. These two aspects are manifested in the creation of substantial entities. When their activity is waxing (rapid or expansive), that is the yang energy mode. When their activity is waning (slow or contractive), that is the yin energy mode. The yang and yin phases constantly interact, each gaining and losing dominance over the other. In the process of the waxing and waning, the alternation of these fundamental vibrations, the so-called five elements evolve (fire, water, wood, metal, and earth). Zhu Xi argues that li existed even before Heaven and Earth.

In terms of li and qi, Zhu Xi's system strongly resembles Buddhist ideas of li (principle) and shi (affairs, matters), though Zhu Xi and his followers strongly argued that they were not copying Buddhist ideas. Instead, they held, they were using concepts already present long before in the I Ching.

Zhu Xi discussed how he saw the Supreme Ultimate concept to be compatible with principle of Taoism, but his concept of taiji was different from the understanding of Tao in Taoism. Where taiji is a differentiating principle that results in the emergence of something new, Tao is still and silent, operating to reduce all things to equality and indistinguishability. He argued that there is a central harmony that is not static or empty but was dynamic, and that the Supreme Ultimate is itself in constant creative activity.

=== Human nature ===
Zhu Xi considered the earlier Confucian Xunzi to be a heretic for departing from Mengzi's idea of innate human goodness. Even if people displayed immoral behaviour, the supreme regulative principle was good. The cause of immoral actions is qi. Zhu Xi's metaphysics is that everything contains li and qi. Li is the principle that is in everything and governs the universe. Each person has a perfect li. As such, individuals should act in perfect accordance with morality. However, while li is the underlying structure, qi is also part of everything. Qi obscures our perfect moral nature. The task of moral cultivation is to clear our qi. If our qi is clear and balanced, then we will act in a perfectly moral way.

=== Heart/mind ===
"Heart" and "mind" are both expressed in Chinese with the same word xin (心); clarity of mind and purity of heart are ideal in Confucian philosophy. In the following poem, "Reflections While Reading - 1" Zhu Xi illustrates this concept by comparing the mind to a mirror, left covered until needed that simply reflects the world around it, staying clear by the flowing waters symbolizing the Tao. In Chinese, the mind was sometimes called "the square inch", which is the literal translation of the term alluded to in the beginning of the poem.

半畝方塘一鑑開，
天光雲影共徘徊。
問渠那得清如許，
為有源頭活水來。

Translation:

A small square pond an uncovered mirror
Where sunlight and clouds linger and leave
I asked how it stays so clear
it said spring water keeps flowing in.

— translation by Red Pine

=== Knowledge and action ===
According to Zhu Xi's epistemology, knowledge and action were indivisible components of truly intelligent activity. Although he did distinguish between the priority of knowing, since intelligent action requires forethought, and the importance of action, as it produces a discernible effect, Zhu Xi said "Knowledge and action always require each other. It is like a person who cannot walk without legs although he has eyes, and who cannot see without eyes although he has legs. With respect to order, knowledge comes first, and with respect to importance, action is more important."

=== The investigation of things and the extension of knowledge ===
Zhu Xi advocated the investigation of things (格物致知; gewu zhizhi). How to investigate and what these things are is the source of much debate. To Zhu Xi, the things are moral principles and the investigation involves paying attention to everything in both books and affairs because "moral principles are quite inexhaustible".

=== Spirituality ===
Zhu Xi did believe in the existence of spirits, ghosts, divination, and blessings.

=== Meditation ===
Zhu Xi practiced a form of daily meditation called jingzuo similar to, but not the same as, Buddhist dhyana or chan ding (禪定; Wade–Giles chʻan-ting). His meditation did not require the cessation of all thinking as in some forms of Buddhism; rather, it was characterised by quiet introspection that helped to balance various aspects of one's personality and allowed for focused thought and concentration.

His form of meditation was by nature Confucian in the sense that it was concerned with morality. His meditation attempted to reason and feel in harmony with the universe. He believed that this type of meditation brought humanity closer together and more into harmony.

=== On teaching, learning, and the creation of an academy ===
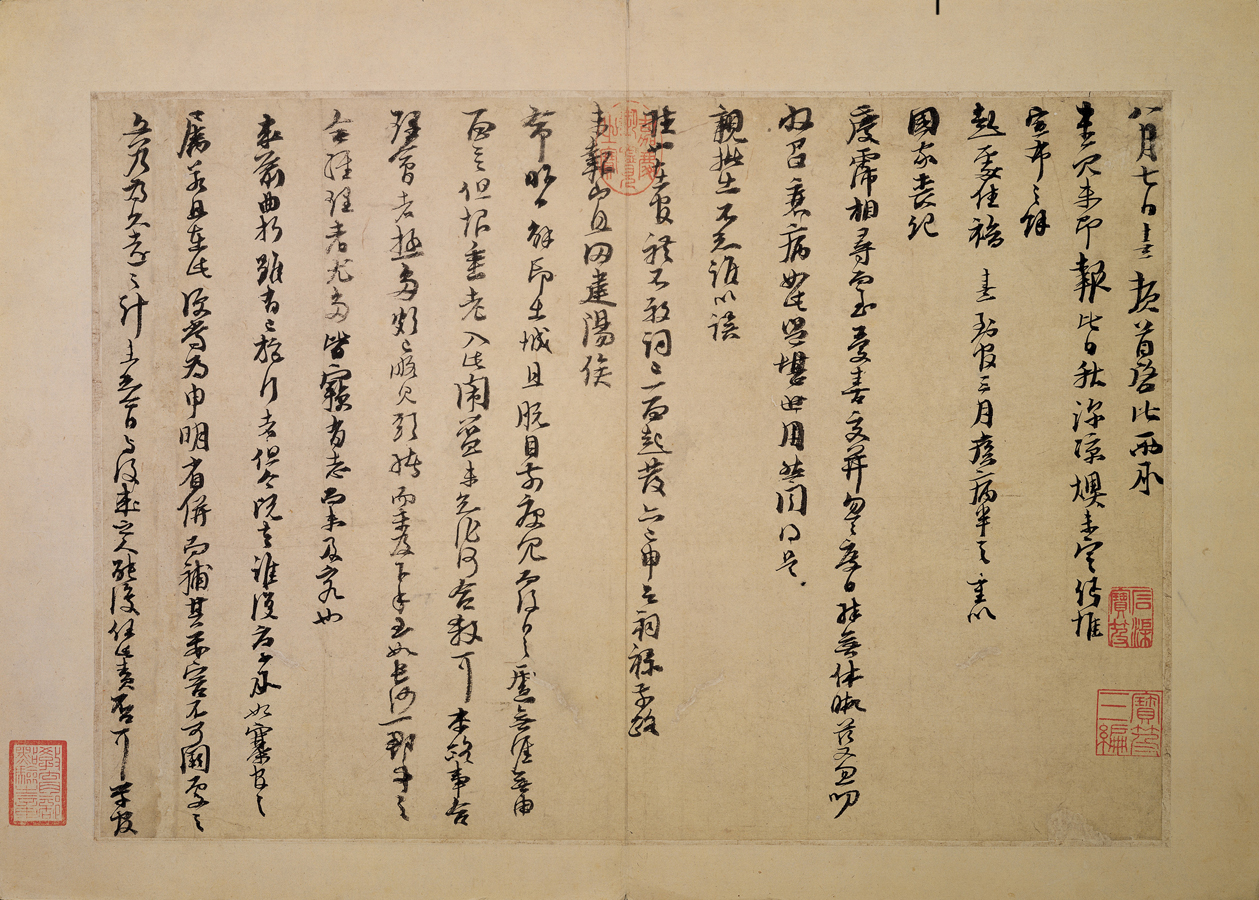
Zhu Xi's letter (1194) instructing a subordinate official on local government matters after he stepped down as Administrator of Tanzhou for reappointment to teach at the imperial court

Zhu Xi heavily focused his energy on teaching, claiming that learning is the only way to sage-hood. He wished to make the pursuit of sage-hood attainable to all men.

He lamented more modern printing techniques and the proliferation of books that ensued. This, he believed, made students less appreciative and focused on books, simply because there were more books to read than before. Therefore, he attempted to redefine how students should learn and read. In fact, disappointed by local schools in China, he established his own academy, White Deer Grotto Academy, to instruct students properly and in the proper fashion.

== Taoist and Buddhist influence on Zhu Xi ==
Zhu Xi wrote what was to become the orthodox Confucian interpretation of a number of concepts in Taoism and Buddhism. While he appeared to have adopted some ideas from these competing systems of thought, unlike previous Neo-Confucians he strictly abided by the Confucian doctrine of active moral cultivation. He found Buddhist principles to be darkening and deluding the original mind as well as destroying human relations.

== Legacy ==
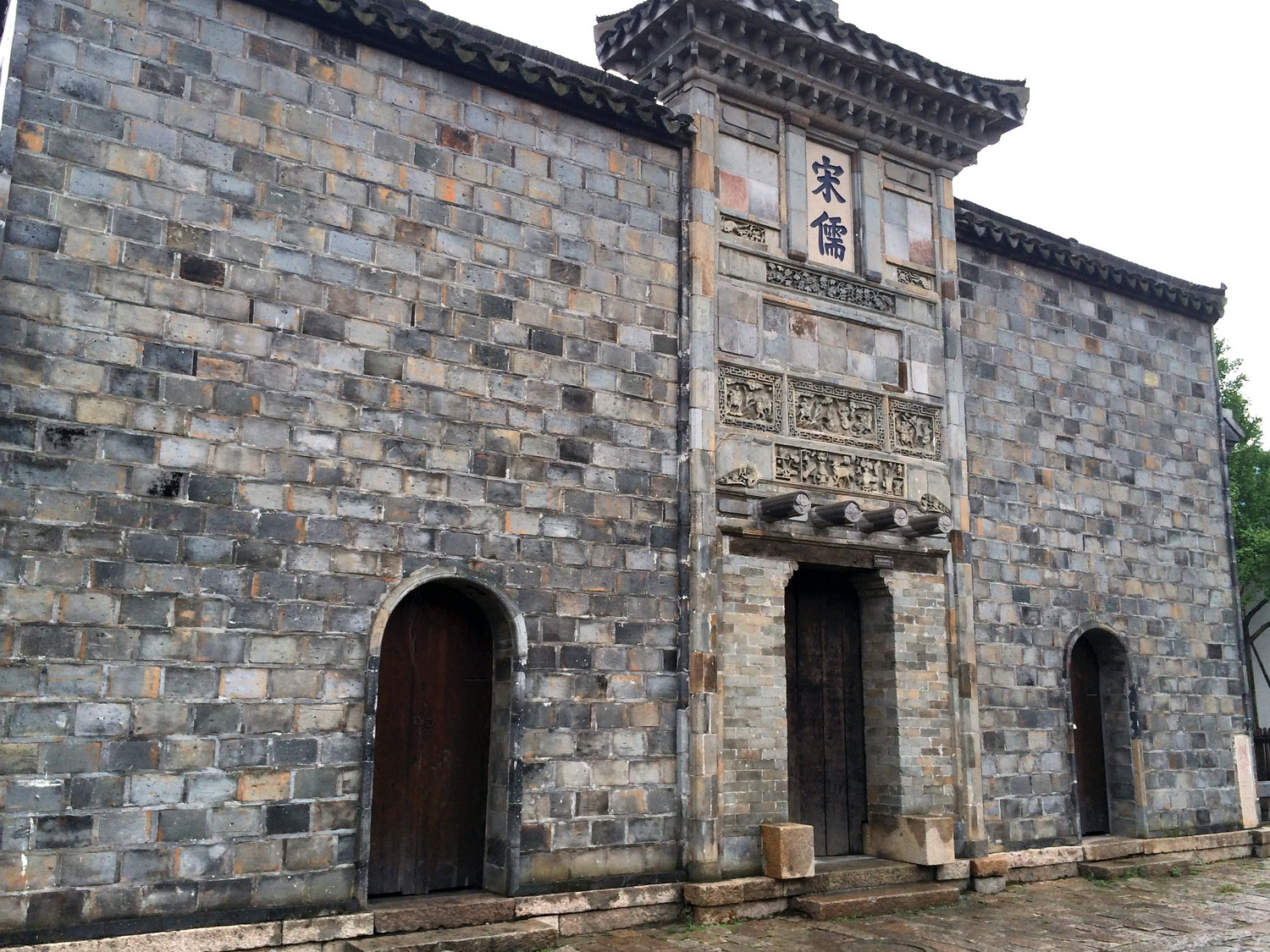
Zhu Xi's Memorial Temple at Huishan ancient town, Wuxi

From 1313 to 1905, Zhu Xi's commentaries on the Four Books formed the basis of civil service examinations in China. His teachings were to dominate Neo-Confucians such as Wang Fuzhi, though dissenters would later emerge such as Wang Yangming and the School of Mind two and a half centuries later.

His philosophy survived the Intellectual Revolution of 1917, and later Feng Youlan would interpret his conception of li, qi, and taiji into a new metaphysical theory.

He was also influential in Japan, where he was known as Shushi and his school as Shushigaku (朱子学, School of Master Zhu), which in Korea, where it became an orthodoxy, is called Jujahak (주자학). He also influenced Confucianism in Vietnam.

Life magazine ranked Zhu Xi as the forty-fifth most important person in the last millennium.

Zhu Xi's descendants, like those of Confucius and other notable Confucians, held the hereditary title of Wǔjīng Bóshì (五经博士; 五經博士), which translated means Erudite or Doctor of the Five Classics and enjoyed the rank of 8a in the Mandarin (bureaucrat) system.

== Calligraphy ==
Zhu Xi had, from an early age, followed his father and a number of great calligraphers at the time in practicing calligraphy. At first he learned the style of Cao Cao, but later specialized in the regular script of Zhong Yao and the running cursive script of Yan Zhenqing. Though his manuscripts left to the world are piecemeal and incomplete, and most of his works are lost. Moreover, his fame in the realm of philosophy was so great that even his brilliance in calligraphy was overshadowed. He was skillful in both running and cursive scripts, especially in large characters, but extant artworks consist mainly of short written notes in running script and rarely of large characters. His authentic manuscripts are collected by Nanjing Museum, Beijing Palace Museum, Liaoning Province Museum, Taipei Palace Museum and the National Museum of Tokyo, Japan. Some pieces are in private collections in China and overseas. The Thatched Hut Hand Scroll, one of Zhu Xi's masterpieces in running-cursive script, is in an overseas private collection.

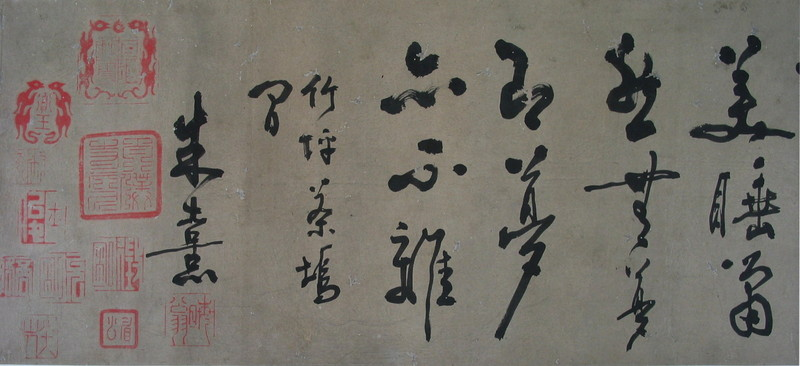
Thatched Hut Hand Scroll

Thatched Hut Hand Scroll contains three separate parts:

1. Title
2. 102 characters by Zhu Xi in running cursive scripts
3. The postscripts by Wen Tianxiang (1236～1283) of Song dynasty, Fang Xiaoru (1375～1402), Zhu Yunming (1460–1526), Tang Yin (1470～1523) and Hai Rui (1514～1587) of the Ming dynasty.

=== Calligraphy style ===
The calligraphy of Zhu Xi had been acclaimed as acquiring the style of the Han and Wei dynasties. He was skillful in the central tip, and his brush strokes are smooth and round, steady yet flowing in the movements without any trace of frivolity and abruptness. Indeed, his calligraphy possesses stability and elegance in construction with a continuous flow of energy. Without trying to be pretentious or intentional, his written characters are well-balanced, natural and unconventional. As he was a patriarch of Confucianism philosophy, it is understandable that his learning permeated in all his writings with due respect for traditional standards. He maintained that while rules had to be observed for each word, there should be room for tolerance, multiplicity and naturalness. In other words, calligraphy had to observe rules and at the same time not be bound by them so as to express the quality of naturalness. It is small wonder that his calligraphy had been highly esteemed throughout the centuries, by great personages as follows:

Tao Chung Yi (around 1329～1412) of the Ming dynasty:

Whilst Master Zhu inherited the orthodox teaching and propagated it to the realm of sages and yet he was also proficient in running and cursive scripts, especially in large characters. His execution of brush was well-poised and elegant. However piecemeal or isolated his manuscripts, they were eagerly sought after and treasured.

Wang Sai Ching (1526–1590) of the Ming dynasty:

The brush strokes in his calligraphy were swift without attempting at formality, yet none of his strokes and dots were not in conformity with the rules of calligraphy.

Wen Tianxiang of the Song dynasty in his postscript for the Thatched Hut Hand Scroll by Zhu Xi:

People in the olden days said that there was embedded the bones of loyal subject in the calligraphy of Yan Zhenqing. Observing the execution of brush strokes by Zhu Xi, I am indeed convinced of the truth of this opinion.

Zhu Yunming of the Ming dynasty in his postscript for the Thatched Hut Hand Scroll by Zhu Xi:

Master Zhu was loyal, learned and a great scholar throughout ages . He was superb in calligraphy although he did not write much in his lifetime and hence they were rarely seen in later ages. This roll had been collected by Wong Sze Ma for a long time and of late, it appeared in the world. I chanced to see it once and whilst I regretted that I did not try to study it extensively until now, in the study room of my friend, I was so lucky to see it again. This showed that I am destined to see the manuscripts of master Zhu. I therefore wrote this preface for my intention.

Hai Rui of the Ming dynasty in his postscript for the Thatched Hut Hand Scroll by Zhu Xi:

The writings are enticing, delicate, elegant and outstanding. Truly such calligraphy piece is the wonder of nature.

== See also ==
- Confucianism
- Neo-Confucianism
- Zhou Dunyi
- Lu Jiuyuan
- Wang Yangming
- Wang Fuzhi
- Feng Youlan
- Yuelu Academy
- White Deer Grotto Academy
- Classical Chinese writers
- Yi Hwang or Toegye, A Korean Confucian scholar of the Joseon dynasty
- Yi I or Yulgok, A Korean Confucian scholar of the Joseon dynasty
- Fujiwara Seika, Japanese follower of the philosophy of Zhu Xi
- Hayashi Razan, Seika's student & Tokugawa political theorist
- Hayashi Gahō, Tokugawa shogunate academician/scholar/bureaucrat
- Kaibara Ekken, Edo period writer/botanist/philosopher
