= Cheng Yi (philosopher) =

Chinese philosopher (1033–1107)

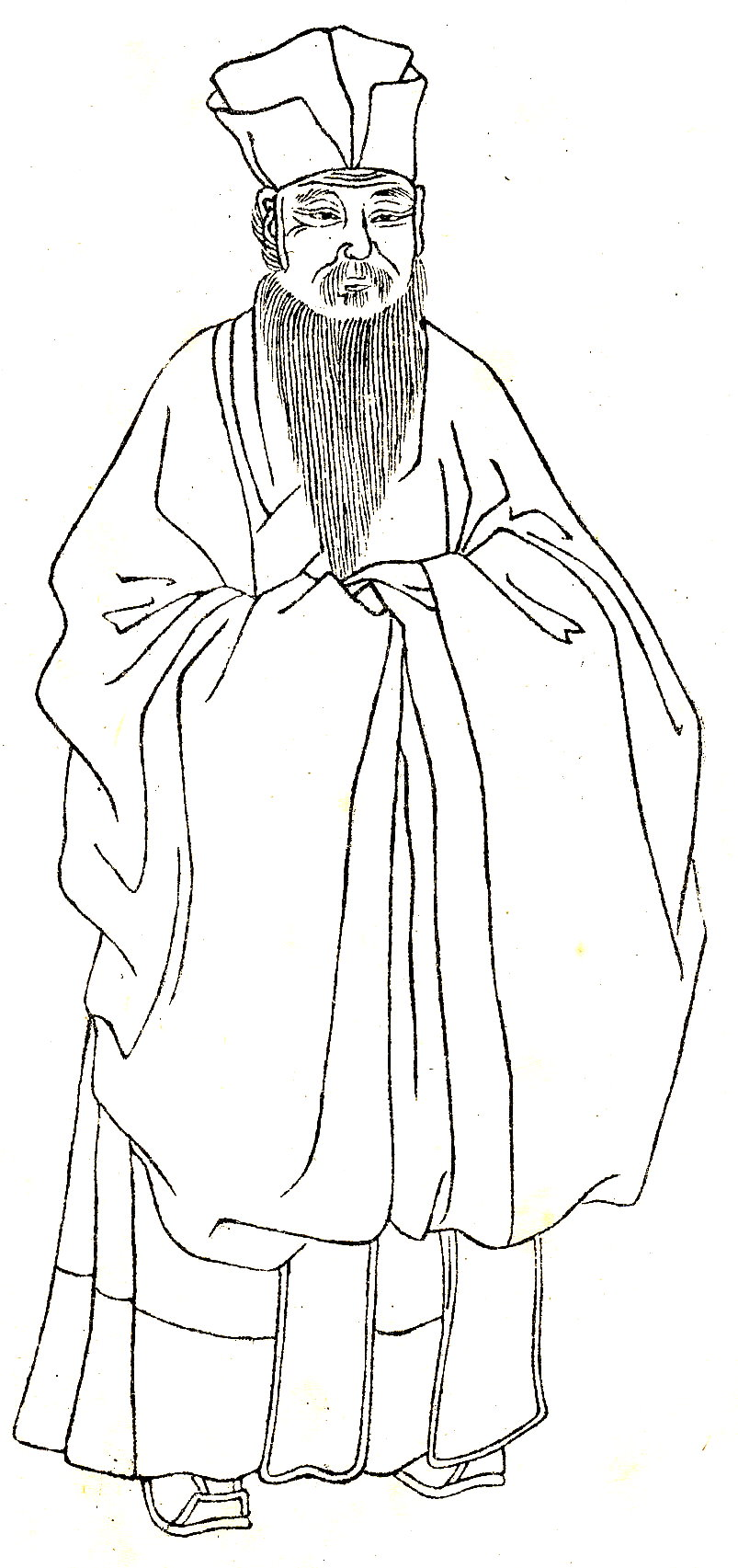
- Imaginary portrait of Cheng Yi by Shangguan Zhou (上官周, b. 1665).
- Born: 1033
- Died: 1107 (aged 74)
- Occupations: Classicist, essayist, philosopher, politician

Philosophical work
- Era: Neo-Confucianism
- Region: Chinese Philosophy

Personal Name
- Traditional Chinese: 程頤
- Simplified Chinese: 程颐
Transcriptions
Standard Mandarin
- Hanyu Pinyin: Chéng Yí
- Wade–Giles: Ch'eng I

Courtesy Name
- Chinese: 程正叔
Transcriptions
Standard Mandarin
- Hanyu Pinyin: Chéng Zhèngshū
- Wade–Giles: Ch'eng Cheng-shu

Literary Pseudonym
- Chinese: 伊川先生
Transcriptions
Standard Mandarin
- Hanyu Pinyin: Yīchuān xiānshēng
- Wade–Giles: I-ch'uan Hsien-sheng

Cheng Yi (1033–1107), also known by various other names and romanizations, was a Chinese classicist, essayist, philosopher, and politician of the Song Dynasty. He worked with his older brother Cheng Hao. Like his brother, he was a student of Zhou Dunyi, a friend of Shao Yong, and a nephew of Zhang Zai. The five of them, along with Sima Guang, are called the Six Great Masters by his follower Zhu Xi. He became a prominent figure in neo-Confucianism, and the philosophy of Cheng Yi, Cheng Hao and Zhu Xi is referred to as the Cheng–Zhu school or the Rationalistic School.

== Life ==
Cheng was born in Luoyang, Henan in 1033. Cheng entered the national university in 1056, and received the "presented scholar" degree in 1059. He lived and taught in Luoyang, and declined numerous appointments to high offices. He campaigned against the reformist policies of Wang Anshi, and after the reformers were dismissed from office, he was appointed expositor-in-waiting in 1086 to begin lecturing the emperor on Confucianism. He was more aggressive and obstinate than his brother, and made several enemies, including Su Shi, the leader of the Sichuan group. In 1097, his enemies were able to ban his teachings, confiscate his properties, and banish him. He was pardoned three years later, but was blacklisted and his work was once more banned in 1103. He was finally pardoned in 1106, one year before his death.

In 1452 the title Wujing Boshi (五經博士) was bestowed upon the descendants of Cheng Yi and other Confucian sages such as Mencius, Zengzi, Zhou Dunyi, and Zhu Xi.

A well known chengyu 程門立雪 refers to an incident when two men (Yang Shi and You Zuo), requesting to be taken on as his disciples, stood in the snow for hours at his door. They became renowned examples of the Confucian virtues of devotion to learning and respect for one's master.

Cheng Yi is widely believed to be responsible for the rise of the cult of widow chastity. He argued that it would be improper for a man to marry a widow since she had lost her integrity. On the question of widows who had become impoverished due to the death of their husbands, Cheng stated: "To starve to death is a small matter, but to lose one's chastity is a great matter." (餓死事小，失節事大). The practice of widow chastity that became common in the Ming and Qing dynasty would lead to hardship and loneliness for many widows, as well as a dramatic increase in suicides by widows during the Ming era. In reality, however, Cheng only insisted the practice on the class of scholar-officials and understood the limitations of peasant life.
