= Wanli era =

Period of Chinese history (1573–1620)

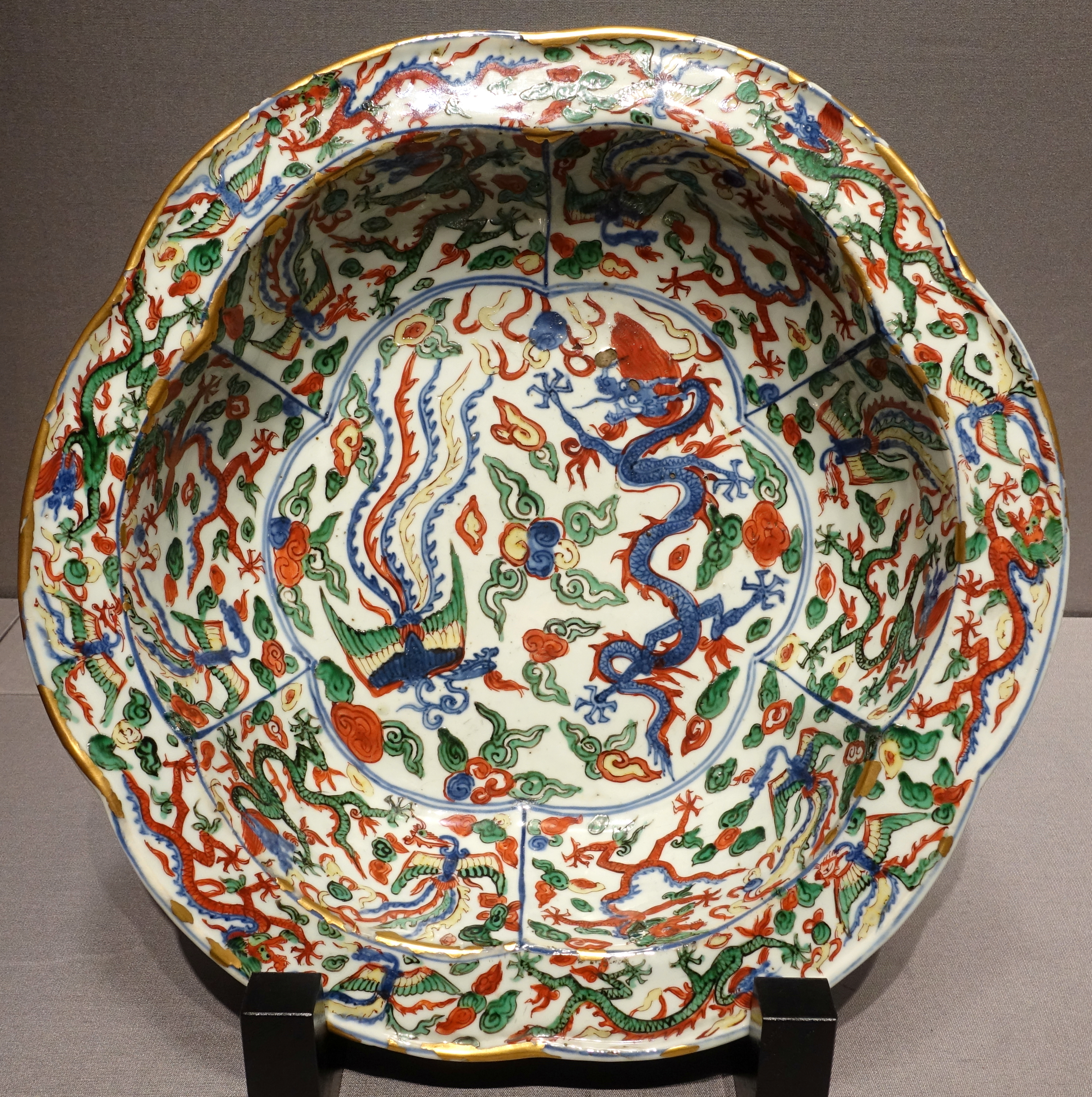
Bowl decorated with dragon and phoenix motifs, Wanli era. Tokyo National Museum

The Wanli era (Note: Simplified Chinese: 万历; traditional Chinese: 萬曆; pinyin: Wànlì) was the period in Chinese history corresponding to the reign of the Wanli Emperor of the Ming dynasty, spanning from 1573 to 1620. It was preceded by the Longqing era and was succeeded by the Taichang era, upon the accession of the Taichang Emperor.

The Wanli era saw a significant boom in industry, particularly in the production of silk, cotton, and porcelain, and agriculture and trade also experienced growth. Increased trade had the strongest impact in Jiangnan, where cities such as Suzhou, Songjiang, Jiaxing, and Nanjing flourished. Despite the economic growth of the empire, state finances remained in a dire state, and while wealthy merchants and the gentry enjoyed lavish lifestyles, the majority of peasants and day laborers lived in poverty.

Culturally, the period is regarded as one of great flourishing. The color woodblock prints and porcelain produced at the time were celebrated for their high artistic quality. Several of the most influential works of Chinese literature were composed during these years, including Water Margin (1573), Journey to the West (1590), and Jin Ping Mei (1610). The painter Xu Wei achieved particular success at this time. His expressive and highly emotional artistic style attracted a wide circle of admirers.

== Background ==
The Longqing Emperor, the 13th emperor of China's Ming dynasty, died in July 1572. His nine-year-old son Zhu Yijun ascended the throne, adopted Wanli as his era name, and became known as the Wanli Emperor. The 48-year Wanli era officially began the following year and was the longest of the Ming. In August 1620, the Wanli Emperor died and was succeeded by his son Zhu Changluo, who announced that the Taichang era would replace the Wanli era with the beginning of the next lunar year on 22 January 1621. The new emperor, however, died in September after a reign of only one month. His son, the Tianqi Emperor, then acceded to the throne and, at the recommendation of court officials, designated the Taichang era as covering the period from the late emperor's accession on 28 August 1620 to the end of the current lunar year on 21 January 1621.

== Climate and natural disasters ==
The years 1570–1620 were relatively warm, especially in winter, with an average temperature one degree higher in centigrade than the previous half century. The weather was also drier, leading to occasional flooding. This trend was particularly evident in the years 1585–1589 and 1614–1619, which experienced severe droughts. On the other hand, cold winters were recorded in 1595–1598 and 1616–1620, resulting in an increase in snowy landscapes depicted in Chinese paintings. (Note: Before the Wanli era, paintings of snowy landscapes were common in the first quarter of the 16th century, and then again in the years 1636–1643.) China faced other natural disasters during the Wanli era. In 1586, extensive flooding occurred, while locust raids destroyed crops in 1587, 1609, and 1615–1619, following periods of drought. Deforestation in the northwest also caused sandstorms, which covered Beijing in clouds of dust in 1618 and 1619. The most significant natural disaster during the Wanli era was the earthquake that struck China in December 1604. Its epicenter was located 30 km off the coast of Fujian, resulting in the destruction of the port cities of Quanzhou and Zhangzhou, as well as damage to buildings in Moon Port. The effects of the earthquake were felt as far as Shanghai and inland areas such as Huguang and Guangxi. The worst individual disasters were the floods in the north in 1585 followed by a major epidemic the following year; a severe drought across the country in 1589; droughts in Fujian and the north in the second decade of the 17th century; and finally, widespread floods in 1613.

Overall, the most difficult years of the Wanli era were the periods 1586–88 and 1615–17. The drought-induced famine of 1587–88 was the first major famine since the mid-1540s, followed by an epidemic. According to the historian of demography Zhao Shuqi, half of the people in northern China died during this time, causing the population of Shanxi, Zhili, and Henan provinces to decrease from 25.6 million in 1580 to 12.8 million in 1588. These disasters also affected the Yangtze Valley. The disasters in the years 1586–88 shocked the government, but the reserves accumulated by Senior Grand Secretary Zhang Juzheng helped overcome the difficulties. The authorities learned from this crisis and were able to intervene when the Henan famine broke out six years later, preventing it from spreading.

The second series of natural disasters began in 1615, preceded by two years of flooding in northern China. This combination of floods and drought greatly impacted agriculture, leading to regions across the country requesting assistance starting in the autumn of 1615. The situation was particularly dire in Shandong, where 900,000 people were starving and the civil administration was beginning to fall apart due to food shortages. The famine spread from northern China to the Yangtze River basin by the end of the year, and the following year it affected Guangdong. By the following year, the northwest and southwest regions of the Ming dynasty were also affected. The drought and floods continued until 1620.

Local authorities did not rely on state reserve granaries, which had mostly disappeared, but instead called on the wealthy to purchase and import grain. Officials only intervened by setting maximum prices. This meant that the state did not have to maintain a stockpile of grain when it could be purchased on the market. Even in fertile years, regions such as Jiangnan still struggled due to their dependence on rice imports.

== New crops from America ==
In the early 16th century, Europeans brought new agricultural crops from America to China, including maize and groundnuts. These crops were documented to have been cultivated in China during the mid-16th century. Sweet potatoes arrived in China by the early 1590s, possibly even earlier. Chinese merchants brought them from the Philippines to Fujian and Guangdong, and may have also imported them from Đại Việt. After a famine in Fujian in 1594, the local governor encouraged and promoted the cultivation of sweet potatoes. These crops quickly took hold in Fujian and Guangdong, and later spread to other regions of China in the second half of the 17th century. The cultivation of maize, sweet potatoes, and groundnuts during the Wanli era significantly increased food production, contributing to a population of over 100 million—approximately twice that of the early Ming period.

Tobacco was commercially grown in Fujian and exported to the Philippines in the early 17th century, and cultivation began in Guangdong. Initially, tobacco was popular among the poor in Jiangnan, but eventually became a habit among the elite. By the beginning of the Qing period, it was reported that "every official, soldier, and eight out of ten peasants" in the region smoked. It was not until the 1630s that Beijing officials began to mention tobacco.

== Economy ==
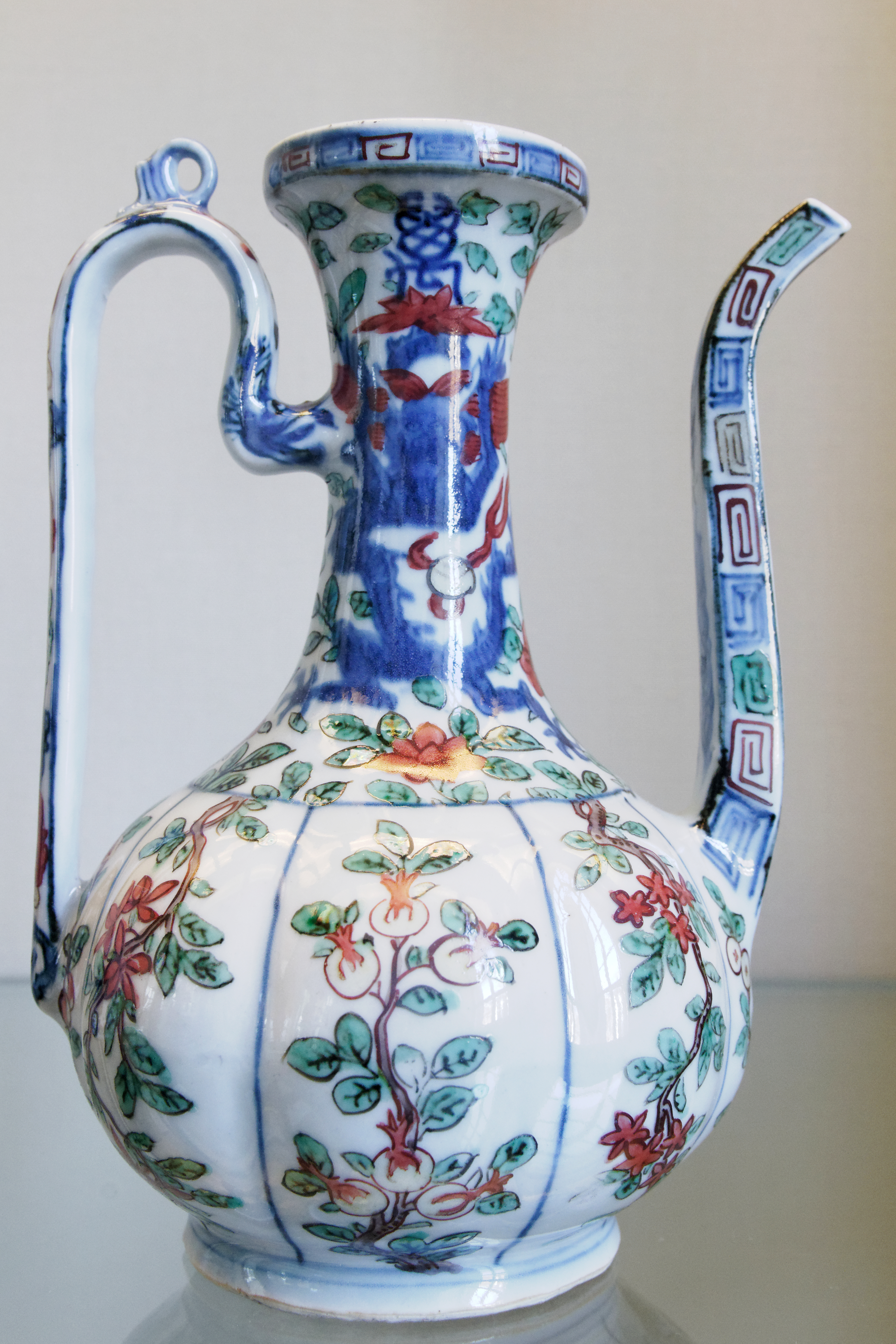
Porcelain teapot from the Wanli era; British Museum, London

During the Wanli era, there was a significant boom in industry, particularly in the production of silk, cotton, and porcelain. The textile industry in Shaanxi employed a large number of people, while Guangdong saw the emergence of large ironworks with thousands of workers. This period also saw the development of specialization in agricultural production and a significant increase in interregional trade. The impact of this development was most strongly felt in Jiangnan, where cities such as Suzhou, Songjiang, Jiaxing, and Nanjing flourished. Suzhou, known for its silk and financial industries, saw its population grow to over half a million by the end of the 16th century, while Songjiang became a center for cotton cultivation.

Between 1560 and 1640, the Spanish colonies in the Americas shipped 10,000 tons of silver across the Pacific, with 9000 tons ending up in China. During this same time period, Japan sent 6–7 times more silver to China. (Note: André Gunder Frank estimated that out of the 137,000 tons of silver mined in Japan between 1550 and 1800, 60,000 ended up in China.) This influx of foreign silver coincided with the commercialization of the economy, which led to growth in industries such as cotton and silk, as well as the growth of cities and trade, but this commercialization did not result in prosperity for all. Land and rice prices remained stagnant, and even fell in the 1570s and 1580s, before experiencing a sudden increase in 1587–89 due to famines in southern China. Wages and labor productivity in the Jiangnan cotton industry also declined. Contemporary commentators observed that while the market economy was thriving, state finances remained poor. Despite the luxurious lifestyle of urban elites, the majority of peasants and day laborers continued to live in poverty. These economic changes also brought about changes in values, particularly in regards to official Confucian doctrines.

During the 16th century, the Ming state gradually shifted towards the policy of zhaoshang maiban (召商買辦; 'the government purchases from private merchants'). For example, during the Jiajing era, the government began purchasing clothes for silver instead of relying on state textile factories in Suzhou and Hangzhou, which had since disappeared and been replaced by private factories. This marked the emergence of a market economy, where traders were no longer mere extensions of the state apparatus and were able to negotiate prices and contract volumes. State contracts also encouraged the growth of private enterprises, while the quality of production in state factories declined. For instance, in 1575, the army had to return 5,000 unusable shields. By the late 16th century, army officers were refusing to use goods produced by state workshops and instead demanded silver from the government to purchase equipment on the market. The government obtained the necessary silver by converting compulsory services into payments in the single whip reform. The aim of the reform was to eliminate levies in kind, services, and compulsory work in the lijia system and replace them with a surcharge to the land tax paid in silver. Transfers of various duties to silver payments had been taking place in various counties since the 1520s, with the most intense changes occurring in the 1570s to the 1590s. County authorities throughout the country implemented the reform. (Note: Three of the most prominent advocates of the single whip reform were Hai Rui (1513–1587), Pang Shangpeng (龐尚鵬; 1524–1581), and Wang Zongmu (王宗沐; 1523–1591).) The changes proceeded from the more developed south of the country to the north, where the introduction of procedures common in the south caused a wave of resistance. Controversy centered primarily on the repeal of progressive household taxation: advocates of the reform argued that wealthy households usually received tax exemptions, making progressive taxation only fictitious. By the end of the 16th century, land tax surcharges had already replaced almost all benefits and labor performed in the lijia system.

In an effort to streamline the collection of land tax in 1581, Senior Grand Secretary Zhang Juzheng advocated for the creation of a new cadastre. Over the course of 1581–1582, fields were measured, boundaries were marked, sizes were calculated, and owners and tenants were recorded. Cadastral maps were also compiled during this time. Due to Zhang's untimely death, there was no final summary of data for the entire country, but at the local level, the work served its purpose. Zhang's cadastre served as the foundation for later Ming and Qing cadastres.

As early as 1581, the Ministry of Revenue had compiled the Wanli kuai ji lu (萬曆會計錄; 'Record of the accounting procedures of the Wanli reign'), which provided an overview of taxes and fees throughout the empire. This document highlighted the complexity, diversity, and dependence on local conditions of these taxes, making unification a challenging task. After incorporating some compulsory works, the land tax amounted to 5–10% of the harvest, but in the four most heavily taxed prefectures of South Zhili, it reached 14–20%. In the 1570s–1590s, approximately 21 million liangs of silver were collected for the land tax, mostly in the form of grain.

=== Trade ===
The national market during the late Ming period, production areas: rice, cotton, silk, and trade directions: rice, cotton, cotton fabrics, silk.

Outside of Jiangnan, in most counties of Ming China, few products were traded across borders, with the most important being grain. Grain was primarily imported to Jiangnan from Jiangxi, Huguang, and western South Zhili, while North Zhili imported rice from Shandong and Beijing imported tax rice. The majority of rice on the market was collected by landlords from their tenants as rent. The grain market also facilitated the production of non-food goods, particularly textiles. In Jiangnan, there were areas that did not grow rice, but instead focused on textile crops such as cotton and mulberry. Mulberries were primarily grown in northern Zhejiang, with Huzhou being a central location. In and around Songjiang, cotton was grown on more than half of the land. The focus was not just on growing and producing goods, but also on selling them. In the late Ming period, the economy in Jiangnan shifted from cultivation to the processing of cotton, which was imported from Shandong, Henan, Fujian, and Guangdong. Suzhou and Hangzhou were known as centers for the production of luxury goods, while ordinary fabrics were produced in the surrounding areas. Within the production process, there was specialization in individual stages, such as spinning and weaving.

Of the various regional merchant groups, those from Shanxi dominated the salt trade in the interior, including Sichuan. Meanwhile, merchants from Huizhou controlled long-distance trade on the Grand Canal and were the most influential wholesalers and retailers in Jiangnan. They were followed by merchants from Suzhou, Fujian, and Guangzhou, in that order. Merchants from Jiangxi operated on a smaller scale, mainly in Henan, Huguang, and Sichuan. Local agents offered boats, crew, and porters for hire on trade routes. Travel guides were published, providing information on routes, distances, inns, famous places, ferries, and safety. Commercial intermediaries allowed for the sending of money through drafts. Women entrepreneurs emerged, selling various goods, and also acted as intermediaries in legal disputes. Conservatives viewed women's involvement in trade with disdain, as seen in the case of Li Le, who praised a prefect for "banning gambling and women from selling at markets" in the Jiaxing prefecture.

=== Silver ===
The growth of silver imports in the early 16th century led to an increase in its use. By the second half of the 16th century, Ming statesmen were already concerned that silver would completely replace bronze coins. In the late 16th century, the issue of the relationship between silver and coins became a central topic in discussions about monetary policy. Some officials suggested halting the production of coins due to their lack of profitability, while their opponents argued that this was a short-sighted policy that ignored the long-term benefits of increasing circulation. This allowed silver to become the dominant currency. In the 1570s and 1580s, debates about currency were dominated by concerns about silver shortages causing deflation, but these debates died down in the 1590s.

The import of silver had a significant impact on the Ming economy. Its price relative to gold and copper fell by half during the Wanli era, but its purchasing power was still greater compared to the rest of the world. The Ministry of Revenue's silver income doubled during the 1570s alone, from about 90 tons to approximately 165 tons per year. The income of local authorities also increased, such as in Moon Port, the main center of foreign maritime trade, where trade licenses and customs fees grew from 113 kg of silver to over one ton between 1570 and 1594. The influx of silver also led to the export of gold and coins. This influx of silver also had negative effects, as inflation appeared in regions with a surplus of silver in the late 16th and early 17th centuries, such as the southeast coast, Jiangnan, and the Grand Canal.

=== Coinage ===
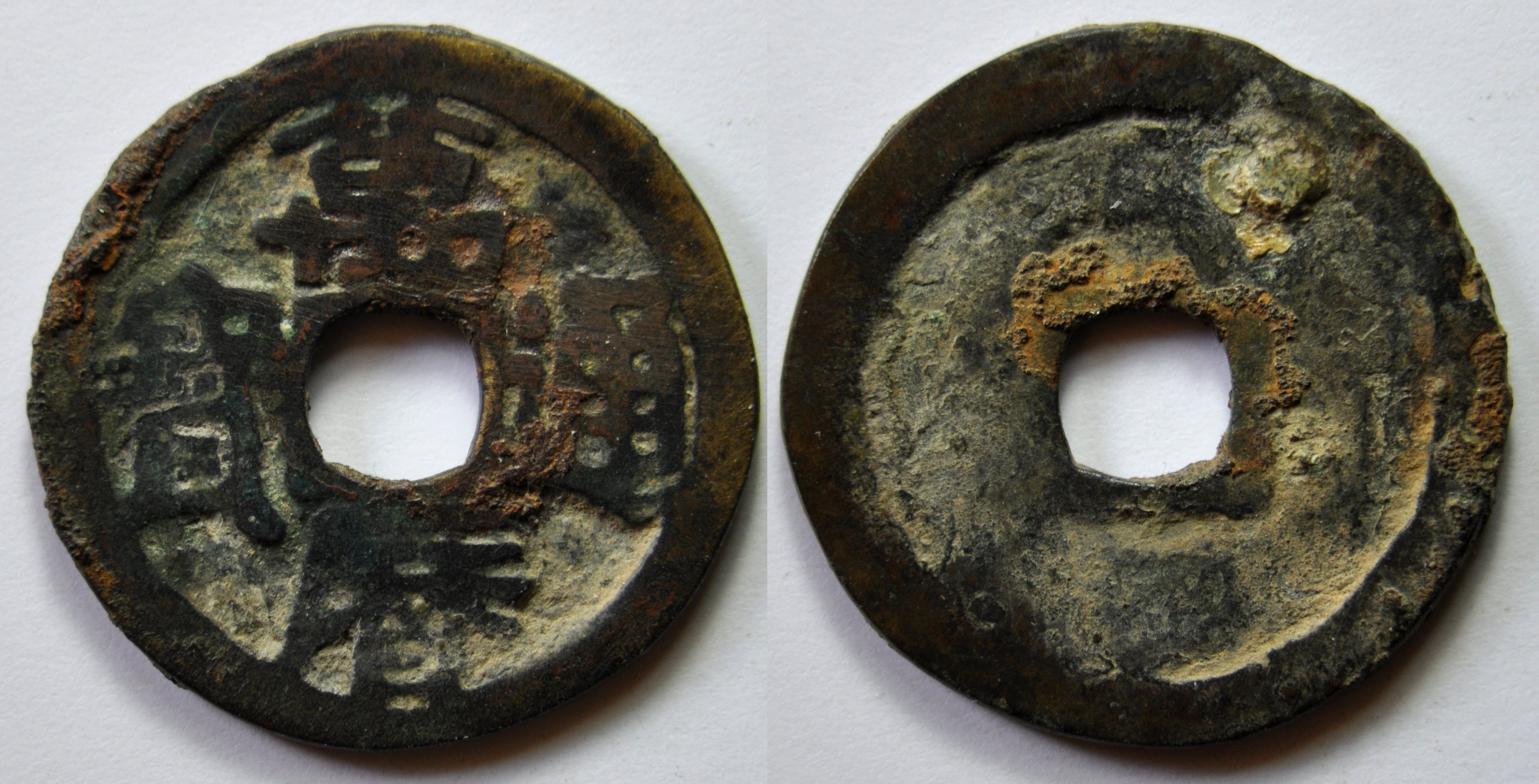
Wanli era coin, 1576

Many officials distrusted silver because they feared dependence on its inflow from abroad and did not trust its ability to provide all the functions of money. They attempted to revive the use of coins. In 1571–1572, the mints were briefly opened, but Zhang Juzheng reopened them in 1576. He restored the mints in Beijing and Nanjing, and later in Yunnan. Additionally, he opened mints in both the northern provinces where coins were commonly used—Shanxi, Shandong, and Henan—as well as in provinces where they were not commonly used—Shaanxi, Jiangxi, Fujian, and Huguang. While the mints in the metropolitan areas were state-owned, licensed entrepreneurs ran those in the provinces. The production of coins faced immediate challenges such as a shortage of copper (Note: State production of coins caused a 70% increase in the price of copper during the years 1577–1581, which in turn raised the cost of casting coins from 0.9–0.98 liang of silver per 1000 coins (officially valued at 1 liang) to 1.35 liang.) and difficulties in hiring qualified personnel. In Jiangxi, for example, the mint was only able to produce 5% of the planned amount of coins. The authorities decreed that at least 70% of tax payments must be made in new coins and encouraged merchants to import coins from surrounding provinces, but merchants often supplied low-quality privately produced coins, which were illegal. Similarly, the introduction of coins failed in Fujian, where silver was already widely used. Zhang's monetary policy was fragmented, with each province's officials making their own decisions on supporting coinage. This led to various issues, such as a revolt in Hangzhou in 1582 when soldiers' salaries were converted into coins in Zhejiang, and the banning of private exchange offices in Jiangxi, which hindered the circulation of new coins. Some provinces also prohibited the export of coins from their territory, while others prohibited coins cast outside their territory. (Note: In the pursuit of profits, officials are associated with private coin manufacturers.) Attempts to introduce new coins into circulation by selling them at a discount only benefited money changers who bought cheap coins from the authorities and resold them at the normal market price. In some cases, attempts to ban the use of illegal private coins resulted in violent protests and the lifting of the bans. While the market accepted coins cast in Beijing, (Note: The government did not primarily put the coins into circulation, but instead kept them as reserves in the treasury of the Ministry of Revenue and the emperor.) low-quality private coins continued to dominate in the south. In 1579, Zhang admitted that the attempt to introduce coins had failed. He closed the Yunnan mint the following year and most of the other provincial mints in 1582, but three mints in Huguang continued to operate, casting different coins and leading to the division of the province into several mint zones. After Zhang's death, his successors and opponents closed most of the mints due to inefficiency. Zhang's opponents argued that the state should not interfere in market and currency affairs and impose a currency that the people did not want. On the other hand, some argued that while silver served as a capital and store of value, coins were essential as a medium of exchange and their production, even if unprofitable, would lead to economic recovery in the long run.

In 1599, the Wanli Emperor returned to an expansive monetary policy. The production of new coins was concentrated in Nanjing, where the capacity of mints increased tenfold, but the circulation of these coins was limited to the immediate vicinity of Nanjing. There was a surplus of coins in the city, causing their value to decrease from 850 to 1300 per liang of silver. In 1606, floods disrupted the import of metals, causing the price of copper to rise. The state limited coin production and laid off 3,000 workers from the mints. These workers then used their knowledge to produce illegal coins, and private coins began to replace national coins within a few years. The government responded by banning the use of private coins, but this caused money changers to stop accepting any coins as a precaution. Nanjing merchants followed suit, leading to riots among the people. This was especially problematic for day laborers and workers who were paid in coins and relied on merchants accepting them for their daily needs. The use of less valuable private coins became more beneficial for their day-to-day transactions.

== Military ==
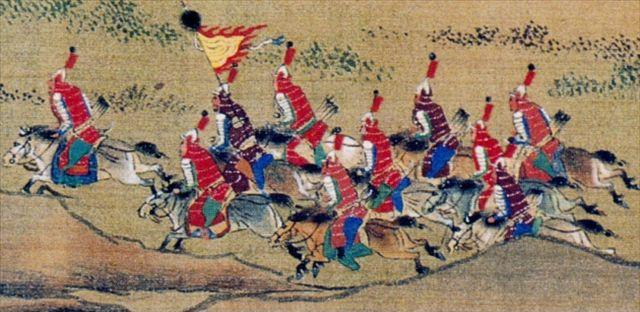
Ming cavalry, illustration from Pingfan desheng tu (平番得勝圖), depicting the campaign to pacify nomadic tribes in Northwest China during the early Wanli era

The largest military campaigns of the Wanli era were known as the "Three Great Campaigns". The first of these was the suppression of the rebellion in Ningxia, followed by the Imjin War with Japan in Korea and the suppression of the Yang Yinglong rebellion in Bozhou. These campaigns involved the mobilization of tens and hundreds of thousands of troops, as well as their movement and long-distance supply. The success of the Ming dynasty in these campaigns can be attributed to the overall increase in China's military power during the 1570s to the first decade of the seventeenth century. During this time, the Ming dynasty was aggressively expanding along all frontiers, including launching raids into the Mongolian steppes and supporting the colonization of Han borderlands. In addition to these three major campaigns, the Ming troops also suppressed several rebellions within the empire and successfully expanded and secured the borders in the southwest through battles with the Burmese. This allowed for the colonization of previously indigenous territories in the southwest and northwest. The Ming dynasty also actively interfered in the affairs of the Jurchens in the northeast.

Following the example of Zhang Juzheng, the Wanli Emperor placed great emphasis on military affairs. This was one of the few areas where most civil officials felt insecure, giving the Emperor the ability to enforce his will. In order to bypass the usual bureaucratic procedures, the Emperor relied on successful generals. The Emperor saw the generals as more dependable and trustworthy than officials, as they spent most of their time in the field and did not have the opportunity to build networks of support in the capital. Additionally, he saw generals as representatives of a different lifestyle, one that was more free and unartistic. He took great care in selecting capable generals and was not afraid to give them extraordinary powers, allowing them to make quick decisions without waiting for his approval. This contributed greatly to the success of their campaigns. The Wanli Emperor was also willing to allocate significant funds from his reserves to supply and equip the troops, and he entrusted the generals with powers and responsibilities that were typically reserved for civil officials, despite objections from the government.

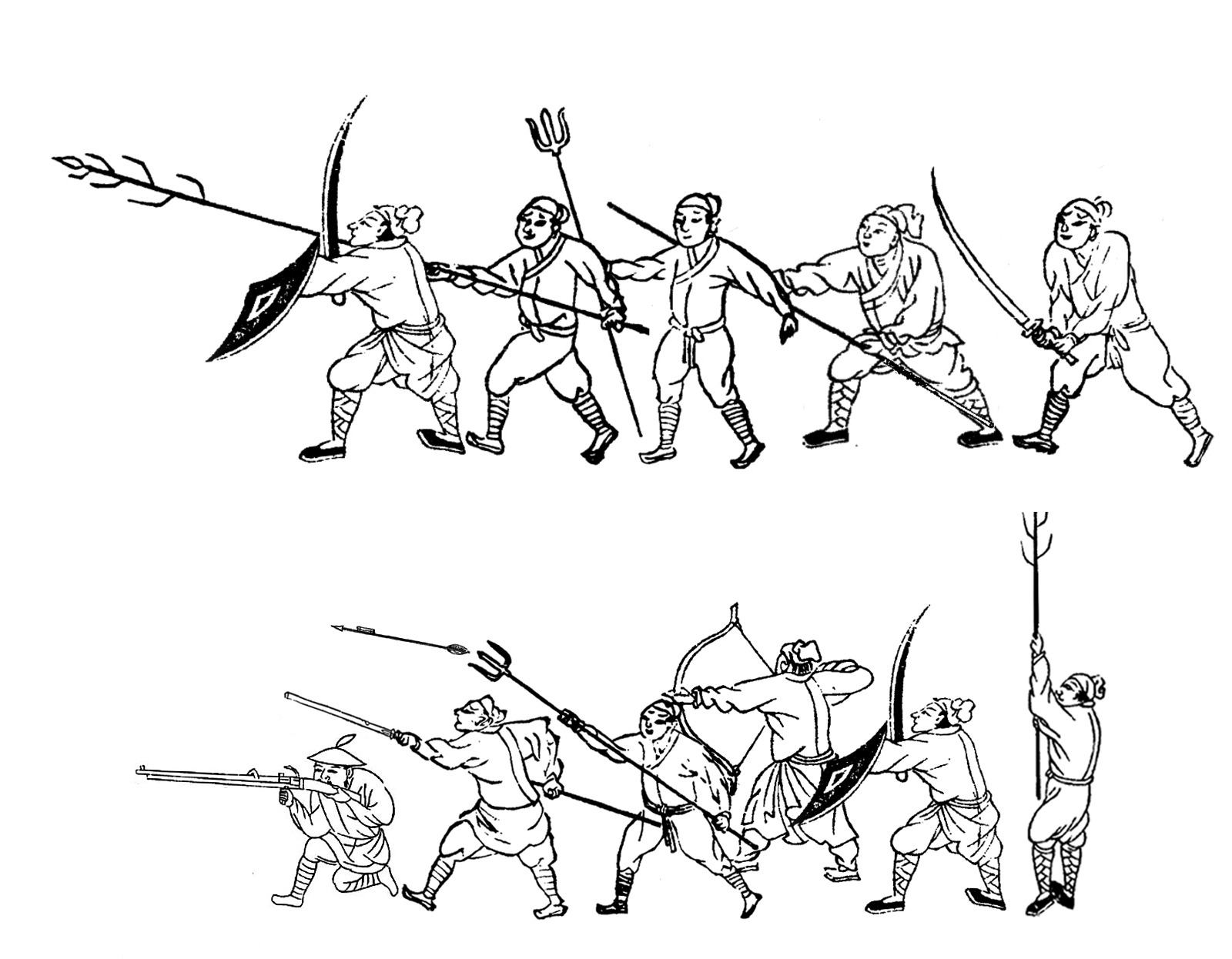
Squad composition, illustration from the military manual Jixiao Xinshu by Qi Jiguang

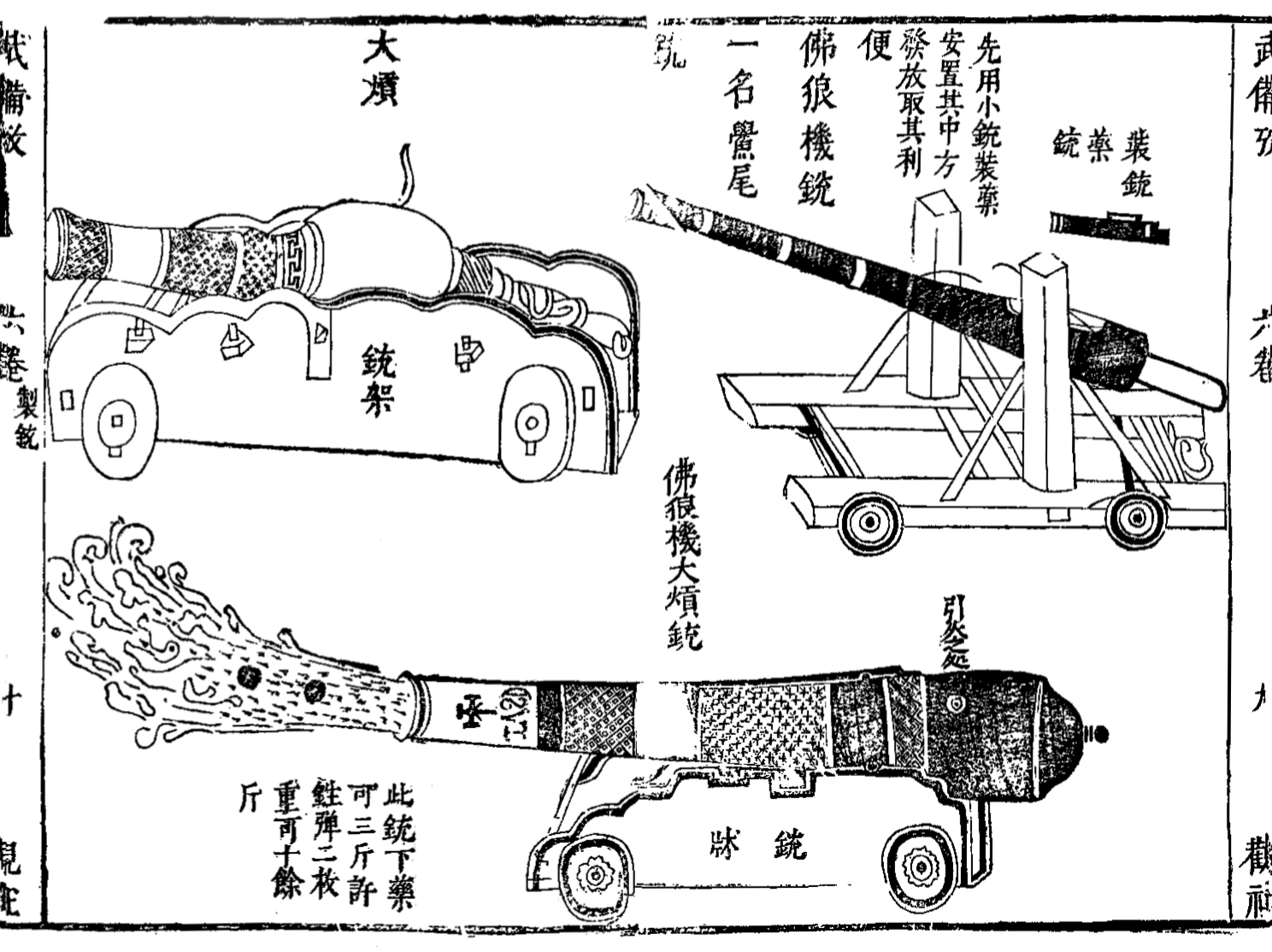
Ming artillery, illustration from the 17th-century military manual Jing guo xiong lue (經國雄略)

On the northern border, the Wanli Emperor aimed to replace static defense with more aggressive tactics. In his own words,

We still shouldn't try to appease the nomads. They could be very ambitious and arrogant; there is no way to satisfy their appetite. It is still essential to build up our own strength so that the borderland is alertly safeguarded.

The Emperor generally preferred a decisive rather than aggressive approach towards domestic rebels and foreign enemies. Under the leadership of capable generals, the Ming army was the strongest it had been since the reign of the Yongle Emperor (1402–1424). Contemporary estimates put the number of Ming soldiers in the 1570s at 845,000. By the beginning of the 17th century, the Ming dynasty had over 4 million men in arms. Training centers were established near Beijing, where units preparing for Korea also trained. Instead of relying on the inefficient and incompetent hereditary soldiers of the Weisuo system, the Ming government turned to hiring mercenaries who were better trained, more disciplined, and more cost-effective in battle. Troops from militant minority nations were also utilized, particularly "wolf troops" (lang bing) from Guangxi. The development of the military was supported by a number of manuals and handbooks. The most extensive surviving works on military affairs are the Chouhai Tubian (Gazeteer of Coastal Defense) by Zheng Ruozeng in 1562, the Shenqi Pu (Treatise on Firearms) by Zhao Shizhen in 1598, and the Wubei Zhi (Encyclopedia of Military Preparedness) by Mao Yuanyi in 1601. In his manuals Jixiao Xinshu and Lianbing Shiji, Qi Jiguang provided detailed tactics for using small groups of soldiers, discussed psychological warfare, analyzed the composition, tasks, and training of units, and outlined the use of weapons and procedures based on terrain and soldier experience. He emphasized the importance of morale and training for soldiers.

== Foreign relations ==
=== Đại Việt ===
In the 1520s, a civil war broke out in Đại Việt (present-day northern Vietnam) between the Mạc dynasty, which had ruled the northern part of the country since 1527, and the followers of the previous Lê dynasty in the south. In 1592, Lê Thế Tông's army invaded the north and captured Hanoi and most of the country. Mạc followers retreated to Cao Bằng Province and the surrounding area near the Sino-Vietnamese border. The government of Lê Thế Tông, led by Trịnh Tùng, who held more power than the monarch, established connections with the Ming regional authorities in an attempt to gain recognition for the Lê dynasty instead of the Mạc. In 1540, the Jiajing Emperor recognized Mạc Đăng Dung as the ruler of Đại Việt, but the country's status was reduced from a kingdom to a local command (都統使司; dutongshisi), which Đăng Dung administered as a pacification commissioner or commandant (都統使司; dutongshiguan, with the lower second rank). In 1597, after a year of negotiations, Lê Thế Tông arrived at the border with a thousand soldiers and servants to meet with a delegation of Ming regional officials in Ming territory. The meeting was held in a friendly manner, with Thế Tông expressing his desire for Đại Việt to maintain its status as a tributary kingdom, but the Ming representatives did not make any commitments. That same year, Thế Tông sent Vice Minister of Works Phùng Khắc Khoan to Beijing as an envoy. Phùng Khắc Khoan made a good impression in Beijing with his classical education, but he was unable to gain recognition for Lê Thế Tông as the king of Đại Việt. The Wanli Emperor justified this by stating that the civil war was not yet over and it was uncertain if the Lê dynasty had true support. Thế Tông only received the seal of the pacification commissioner. (Note: The Ming emperors did not confirm the royal title for the Lê dynasty until 1646, during the reign of Zhu Youlang of Southern Ming. By this time, the Ming had already lost most of China to the Qing dynasty. After establishing diplomatic relations, the Qing also confirmed the royal status of Viet rulers.)

=== Spain, Portugal, and Japan ===
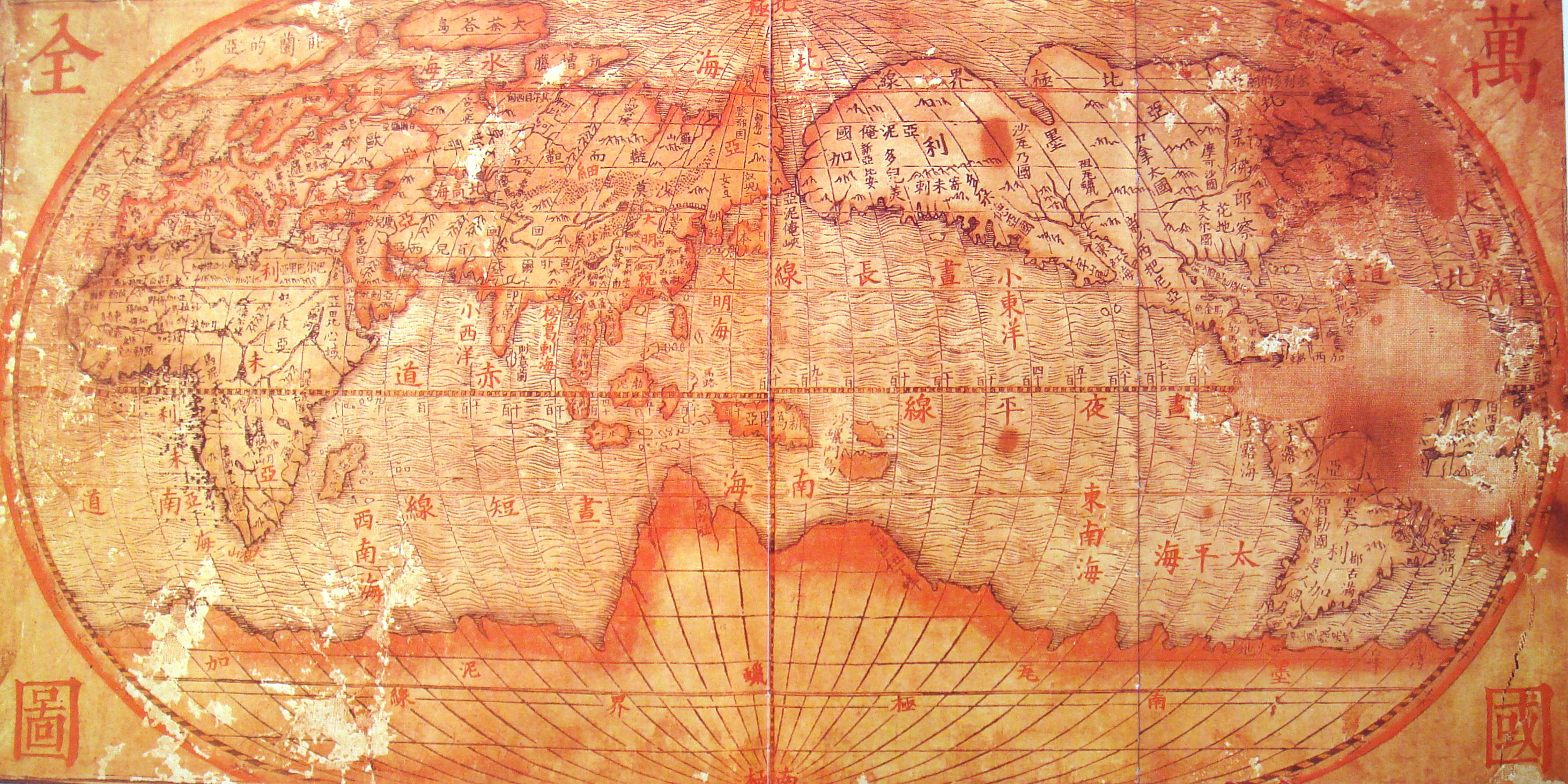
Wanguo Quantu (Complete Map of the Myriad Countries) compiled in 1620 by the Jesuit Giulio Aleni for Chinese readers

In the early 1570s, the Spanish settled in the Philippines, centered in Manila. Trade with the Spanish was highly profitable for the Chinese, as the Spanish bought silk in Manila for double its price in China. The Spanish paid for Chinese goods in American silver, which they imported to China across the Pacific in considerable quantities, estimated to be between 50 and 350 tons per year. This trade between the Spanish Philippines and China flourished, leading to the rapid growth of a Chinatown in Manila. The number of Chinese settlers in Manila increased from forty in the early 1570s to 10,000 in 1588 and 30,000 in 1603. The Spanish authorities viewed the Chinese with suspicion and concern. This mutual distrust often resulted in armed clashes. In 1603, a pogrom broke out in Manila. The violence began in the city, and the defeated Chinese were pursued to Batangas, where native Filipinos also attacked them. The total loss of life is reported to have exceeded 20,000 according to Chinese sources, while Spanish records place the figure at around 15,000.

During the 1540s, American silver was also introduced to China through the extensive Portuguese trade. Lisbon elites were known to wear Chinese silks, drink Chinese tea, and order porcelain with European motifs from China. The Portuguese had settled in Macau with the consent of local authorities as early as the 1550s. In 1578, Ming authorities granted them permission to trade in Guangzhou, and they have continued to do so ever since. At the end of the 16th century, between 6 and 30 tons of silver were transported annually from Portugal to Macau. The Dutch also played a significant role in the trade, with the turnover of their trade at the turn of the 16th and 17th centuries matching that of the Portuguese. By 1614, Amsterdam burghers were regularly purchasing blue and white Ming porcelain.

In addition to merchants, missionaries also traveled to China from Europe. The Jesuits, in particular, were successful in spreading the Christian faith through their strategic approach of honoring missionaries. Notable figures such as Michele Ruggieri and Matteo Ricci gained the trust of Chinese dignitaries and were able to persuade some to convert to Christianity. The Jesuits were highly esteemed in Beijing's upper circles for their expertise in mathematics and astronomy, and Ricci was even accepted by the Emperor.

In China, silver was a scarce commodity, making it more valuable than in other countries. European traders took advantage of the relative cheapness of Chinese goods. Chinese silk became popular in other parts of the world such as in Latin America. This led to a decline in local silk production in Mexico, which had only been introduced by the Spanish a short time before. On the other hand, the textile industry, which utilized Chinese silk, flourished and even exported to European markets. By the 1630s, there was a significant Chinese community in Mexico City, and they also resided in other areas like Acapulco.

After the unification of Japan, the discovery of new silver mines and the improvement of mining techniques, the extraction and export of silver from Japan increased dramatically, particularly to Ming China. Between 1560 and 1600, the annual export of silver ranged from 33 to 49 tons, but due to the Ming ban on trade with Japan, the import of Japanese silver was facilitated by the Portuguese. In the early 17th century, Japanese silver exports continued to rise, with the import of luxury goods such as silk (reaching up to 280 tons per year in the 1630s). Silk was so abundant and inexpensive in Japan that even some peasants were able to afford it, leading to a rise in its popularity among the lower classes.

=== Russia ===
In the autumn of 1618, Russian ambassadors first arrived in Beijing. On the orders of Tsar Mikhail Fyodorovich, the Tobolsk voivode Ivan Kurakin had sent a group of Siberian Cossacks led by Ivan Petlin to China. The journey began in May 1618 from Tomsk and involved crossing the mountains on the Russian-Mongolian border, passing through Mongolia and the Gobi, and finally arriving in Beijing in early September, but due to the Cossacks' lack of gifts or credentials, Ming officials did not grant them an audience with the Wanli Emperor. Despite this, the Ministry of Rites warmly received the Russians, and the Emperor sent them a letter, agreeing to future Russian missions and the arrival of Russian merchants. After a few days, the Russians began their return journey, arriving back in Tomsk in May 1619 and reaching Moscow by the end of the year. Due to Russia's focus on European affairs, there were no further official contacts with China until the end of the Ming dynasty.

=== England ===
In 1602, Queen Elizabeth I wrote a personal letter expressing her desire for better trade and friendly relations between England and China. She entrusted George Weymouth with delivering the letter to the Wanli Emperor, but due to bad weather and a mutiny encountered during his journey, Weymouth was forced to return to England and the letter did not reach its intended destination. It was not until 1984 that the letter finally arrived in China. The letter was written in English, Italian, Latin, and Portuguese, in the hopes that someone in China would be able to read one of these languages.

Elizabeth I letter to Emperor of Cathay (1602):

Elizabeth, by the grace of God, Queen of England, France and Ireland, Defender of the Faith to the great, mighty and invincible Emperor of Cathay, greetings. We have received divers and sundry reports both by our own subjects and others, who have visited some parts of Your Majesty's empire. They have told us of your greatness and your kind usage of strangers, who come to your kingdom with merchandise to trade. This has encouraged us to find a shorter route by sea from us to your country than the usual course that involves encompassing the greatest part of the world. This nearer passage may provide opportunity for trade between the subjects of both our countries and also amity may grow between us, due to the navigation of a closer route. With this in mind, we have many times in the past encouraged some of our pioneering subjects to find this nearer passage through the north. Some of their ships didn't return again and nothing was ever heard of them, presumably because of frozen seas and intolerable cold. However, we wish to try again and have prepared and set forth two small ships under the direction of our subject, George Waymouth, employed as principal pilot for his knowledge and experience in navigation. We hope your Majesty will look kindly on them and give them encouragement to make this new discovered passage, which hitherto has not been frequented or known as a usual trade route. By this means our countries can exchange commodities for our mutual benefit and as a result, friendship may grow. We decided for this first passage not to burden your Majesty with great quantities of commodities as the ships were venturing on a previously unknown route and would need such necessities as required for their discovery. It may please your Majesty to observe, on the ships, samples available from our country of many diverse materials which we can supply most amply and may it please your Majesty to enquire of the said George Waymouth what may be supplied by the next fleet.

In the meantime, we commend Your Majesty to the protection of the Eternal God, who providence guides and follows all kings and kingdoms. From our Royal Palace of Greenwich, the fourth of May anno Domini 1602 and of our reign 44.

— Elizabeth R

This was not the first time Queen Elizabeth I attempted to send a letter to the Emperor of China. She had made previous attempts in 1583 and 1596, but none of them were successful in reaching the Ming court. The British Museum eventually collected these letters, and Queen Elizabeth II delivered them during her historic visit to China in 1986.

== Culture and society ==
=== Philosophy ===
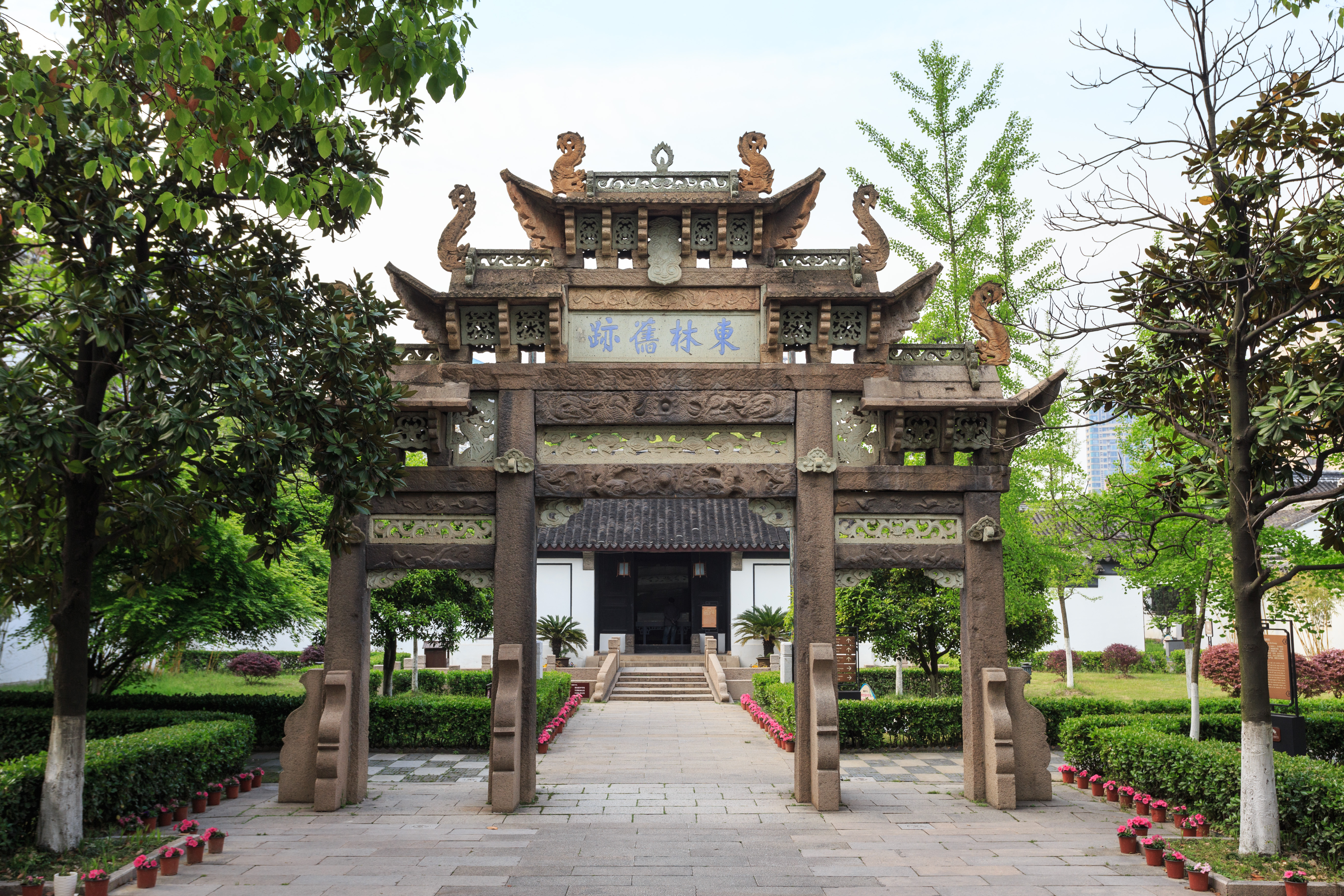
The restored gate of the Donglin Academy

During the Ming dynasty, the dominant ideology of the court and the scholarly elite was the Neo-Confucian doctrine of Zhu Xi (1130–1200), a scholar and philosopher from the Song dynasty. This belief system was elevated to the status of a state cult, but it also incorporated elements from other traditional Chinese religious and ethical systems, particularly Buddhism, as China has a long history of religious syncretism. However, there was not complete consensus on philosophy and religion. Many thinkers during the Song and Ming periods developed their own unique ideas and criticized the official doctrine. One influential figure was Wang Yangming (1472–1529), a scholar-official and philosopher who introduced new elements into Neo-Confucianism. His opponents accused him of distorting Confucius's teachings due to his exposure to Chan Buddhism.

Wang Yangming rejected the idea of Confucianism as a fixed belief, stating that "The Way is not the private property of Confucius". He emphasized the importance of self-awareness and self-knowledge over strict adherence to doctrine. In general, he shifted the focus of Confucianism from following the teachings of past sages to following one's own heart. In the 1570s, Zhang Juzheng emerged as a strong opponent of Wang's followers, offering an alternative perspective. Zhang emphasized the pragmatic pursuit of state interests, in contrast to the emphasis on personal improvement within Wang's teachings. He believed that actions that benefited the state and its people were the correct ones, stating "If it is to the benefit of the state, I would do it regardless of life or death". Zhang justified his actions against those who were preoccupied with moral debates and self-reflection, viewing them as irresponsible and unproductive. He did not see them as moral role models, but rather as lazy individuals.

After the death of Zhang Juzheng in 1584, three Ming philosophers, Hu Juren (胡居仁), Chen Xianzhang, and Wang Yangming, were given exceptional official recognition. They were among the supporters of private Confucian academies whose tablets were placed in the Temple of Confucius. (Note: During the Ming dynasty, from 1368 to 1644, the honor of having one's name displayed on a tablet in the Temple of Confucius was only bestowed upon four Confucian scholars—in 1571 to Xue Xuan (薛瑄) and in 1584 to the mentioned trio.) Wang's followers, particularly Wang Gen and his students, known as the Taizhou School, were the most radical in their rejection of Zhuist orthodoxy. In the late 16th century, Li Zhi accused the conformists in authority of hypocrisy, prioritizing their own benefit and career over correctness. He also questioned the infallibility of the classics and defended the legitimacy of human desires. Li believed that pursuing self-interest was good, as it motivated peasants, artisans, and scholars to perform their professions to the best of their abilities. This led to the spread of values such as materialism, pragmatism, and utilitarianism, and the judging of people not by their occupation but by their wealth. The social status of poor scholars was no longer higher than that of rich merchants. The enthusiasm for Wang Yangming's subjectivism reached its peak at the turn of the 16th and 17th centuries, when individual experience was valued above traditional patterns. These attitudes later influenced the criticality and empiricism of the Qing Confucians.

In the late 16th century, there was a growing trend towards syncretism, which seemed to stem from a dissatisfaction with traditional Confucian beliefs. Lin Zhao'en (林兆恩), known as the "Master of the Three Teachings", sought to connect Confucianism with Buddhism and Taoism, particularly in regards to Taoist healing practices. Along with his studies in Confucianism, Hu Zhi also delved into Buddhism and Taoism, practicing meditation and ultimately achieving enlightenment. From a Buddhist perspective, this was seen as a "revelation of Buddha-Nature", while Confucians viewed it as a "discovery of the heart/mind through innate knowledge".

In 1603, Gu Xiancheng, upon the suggestion of his friend Gao Panlong, revived the Donglin Academy as a hub for discussions on Confucianism. This initiative attracted hundreds of educated individuals who engaged in regular debates, quickly establishing the academy as a prominent intellectual center on a national level. The Donglins rejected the Buddhist and Taoist practice of seclusion, instead advocating for active participation in public life. The academy's leaders aimed for a moral revival to improve the political climate of the country. They opposed the devotion to intuition promoted by Wang Yangming's follower Wang Ji and the Taizhou School, instead emphasizing disciplined effort and action. Following Zhu Xi's model, they divided their studies between reading books and meditation, which they did not associate with Chan Buddhism, but rather derived from Confucian ritualism.

=== Calligraphy and painting ===
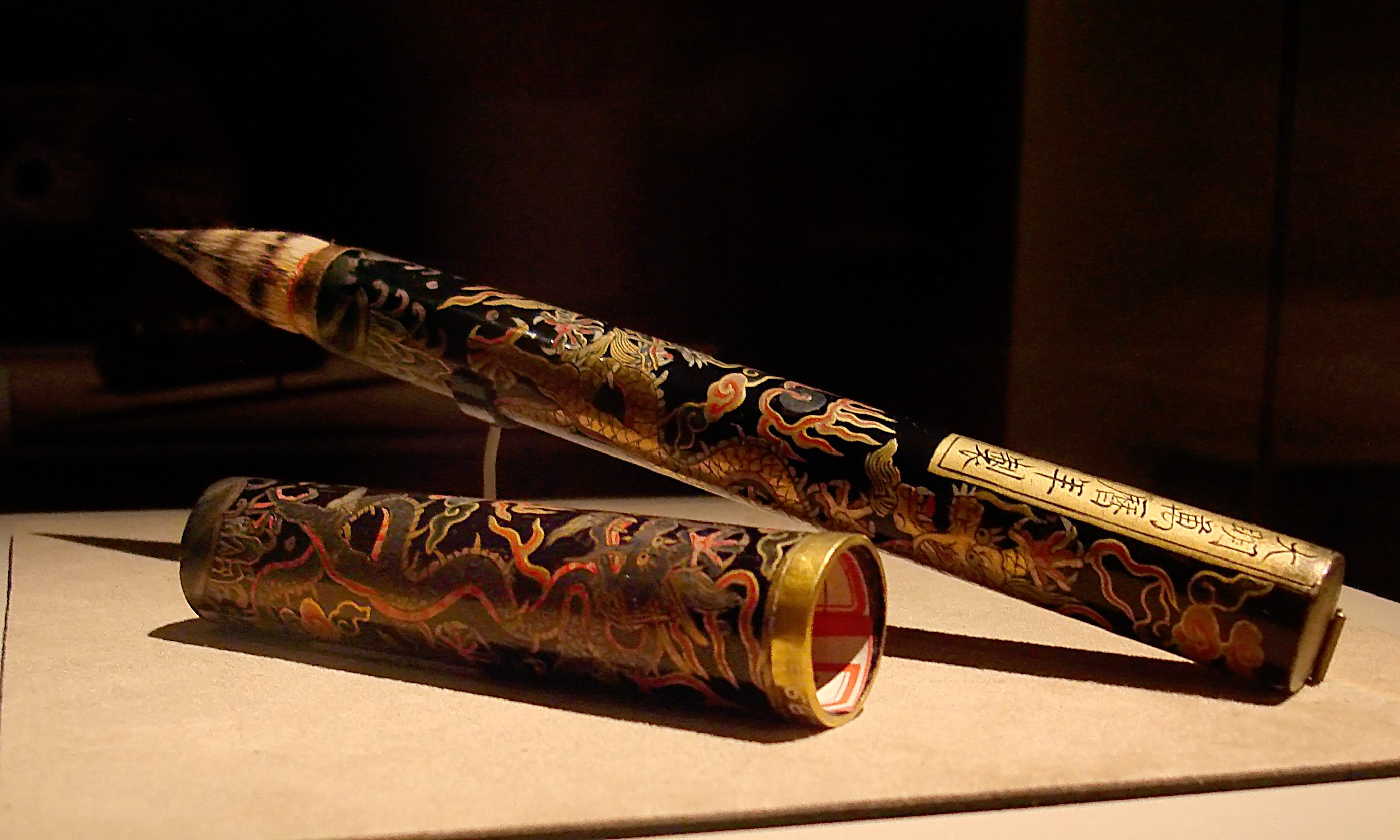
Calligraphy brush, Wanli era

In his theoretical works, the renowned artistic scholar Dong Qichang from Songjiang expressed the aesthetic rules of the Imperial Painting Academy. While he was primarily known as a theoretician of painting, he also wrote about the history of calligraphy. Dong emphasized the importance of painting as a form of calligraphic expression and encouraged artists to study the techniques of past masters. In order to validate his own artistic abilities, he argued that throughout history, painters were divided into two distinct schools: the ink painting of the Southern School, which strove to express the inner essence of the subject, and the descriptive, decorative tradition of professional "craftsman" painters of the Northern School. He positioned himself at the end of the development of the Southern School as the heir of literati painting, seeking to express the thoughts of the creator rather than seeking material gain. His monumental ink landscapes became the standard for traditional painting, and it was not until the 20th century that the concept of the Northern and Southern Schools was reevaluated. One of the notable painters of the Wanli era was Wu Bin, who worked in Nanjing and later at the Beijing court. He was known for his eccentric style, influenced by the local Fujian tradition and elements of the Wu School, which gave his paintings a sense of elegance and beauty, but he also incorporated expressive techniques from the Zhe School.

Dong Qichang was a dominant figure in the theory and practice of late Ming calligraphy. In his works on calligraphy, he placed the masters of his Songjiang region above those of Suzhou. He stressed the importance of studying calligraphy from the Eastern Jin (4th century) and Tang (7th–9th century) periods, specifically highlighting the works of Wang Xizhi and Wang Xianzhi. He did not advocate for direct imitation of their styles, but rather a thorough analysis of their techniques. Other notable calligraphers from the second half of the 16th century in Songjiang included Dong's friend Chen Jiru, a versatile artist and collector, and Xu Wei, a predecessor of individual Qing dynasty artists, known for his "flowers and birds" genre paintings and his "crazy conceptual calligraphy" style, which was similar to abstract painting.

=== Poetry ===
In the 1570s and 1580s, Wang Shizhen held the esteemed position of literary arbiter and most respected cultural critic in Ming China. He was a versatile artist and the leading figure among the Later Seven Masters of the Ming. In the following generation, at the beginning of the 17th century, poets focused on expressing their own nature, individual creativity, and emotions. Their thinking was influenced by the individualistic philosophy of Li Zhi. Prominent figures of this era included Tang Xianzu, a poet, essayist, calligrapher, dramatist, and literary theorist; Xu Wei, a poet, essayist, calligrapher, painter, and dramatist; and Tu Long, a poet, critic, dramatist, art collector, and connoisseur. One of the most notable poets of the Wanli era was Hu Yinglin, who came from a wealthy family but chose to pursue literature instead of a career in the civil service after failing the examinations. Although his poems were not particularly significant, he compiled an encyclopedia of poetics called Shisou (Thickets of criticism). In this work, he provided a structured overview of poetic forms, history, and sources from the perspective of the archaizing movement. This movement viewed Tang poetry as the pinnacle of poetic achievement, but also recognized its revival during the Yuan period and the contributions of the seven earlier and seven later masters in the 16th century.

The poets of the Gong'an School, particularly the Yuan brothers—Yuan Hongdao, Yuan Zongdao (袁宗道), and Yuan Zhongdao—held distinct positions. Li Zhi had a direct influence on the Yuan brothers and the Gong'an School, shaping their rejection of traditional authorities, avoidance of imitation (which they believed stifled creativity), pursuit of natural expression, and advocacy for drama and fiction as legitimate literary forms. The Yuan brothers' style was largely conventional; they differed from previous generations (Earlier Seven Masters and Later Seven Masters of the Ming) by imitating middle Tang (especially Bai Juyi) and Song (Su Shi) poetry rather than the pinnacle of Tang poetry. In this, they followed Wang Shizhen, who also looked to middle Tang and Song poets as role models. More than their poetry, the brothers' criticism was widely read and their conclusions had gained general recognition by the mid-17th century. The brothers were also active in literary associations, blending Confucianism with Buddhism and Taoism, and exploring various prose and encyclopedic disciplines such as floristry and pharmacopoeia. Yuan Hongdao was a proponent of literature written in colloquial language, arguing that it too was capable of conveying moral truths. Literary connections were not limited to the educated gentry, but also extended to professional painters, writers, and calligraphers, as well as art-loving merchants, talented women, and courtesans. This diverse cultural scene became a significant aspect of Ming literature in the following generation.

During the turn of the 16th and 17th centuries, another literary movement emerged known as the Jingling School, led by Tan Yuanchun and Zhong Xing. While they shared the belief of the Gong'an school that poetry should express "natural feelings", they criticized the imitation of Bai Juyi and Su Shi as producing "vulgar and crude" poetry. Instead, they focused on cultivating their own style, striving to capture the depth and scale of their favorite pre-Tang and Tang works, but often falling into the trap of imitation. Their most notable contributions were the anthologies Return to Old poetry (古詩歸; Gushi gui) and Return to Tang poetry (唐詩歸; Tangshi gui), published in 1614 and 1617 respectively, in which they expressed their views on poetic creation. The success of these anthologies was further enhanced by the contributions of Min Qiji (閔齊伋), who distinguished the poems in color from the editors' notes and comments for the convenience of readers.

=== Literature and drama ===
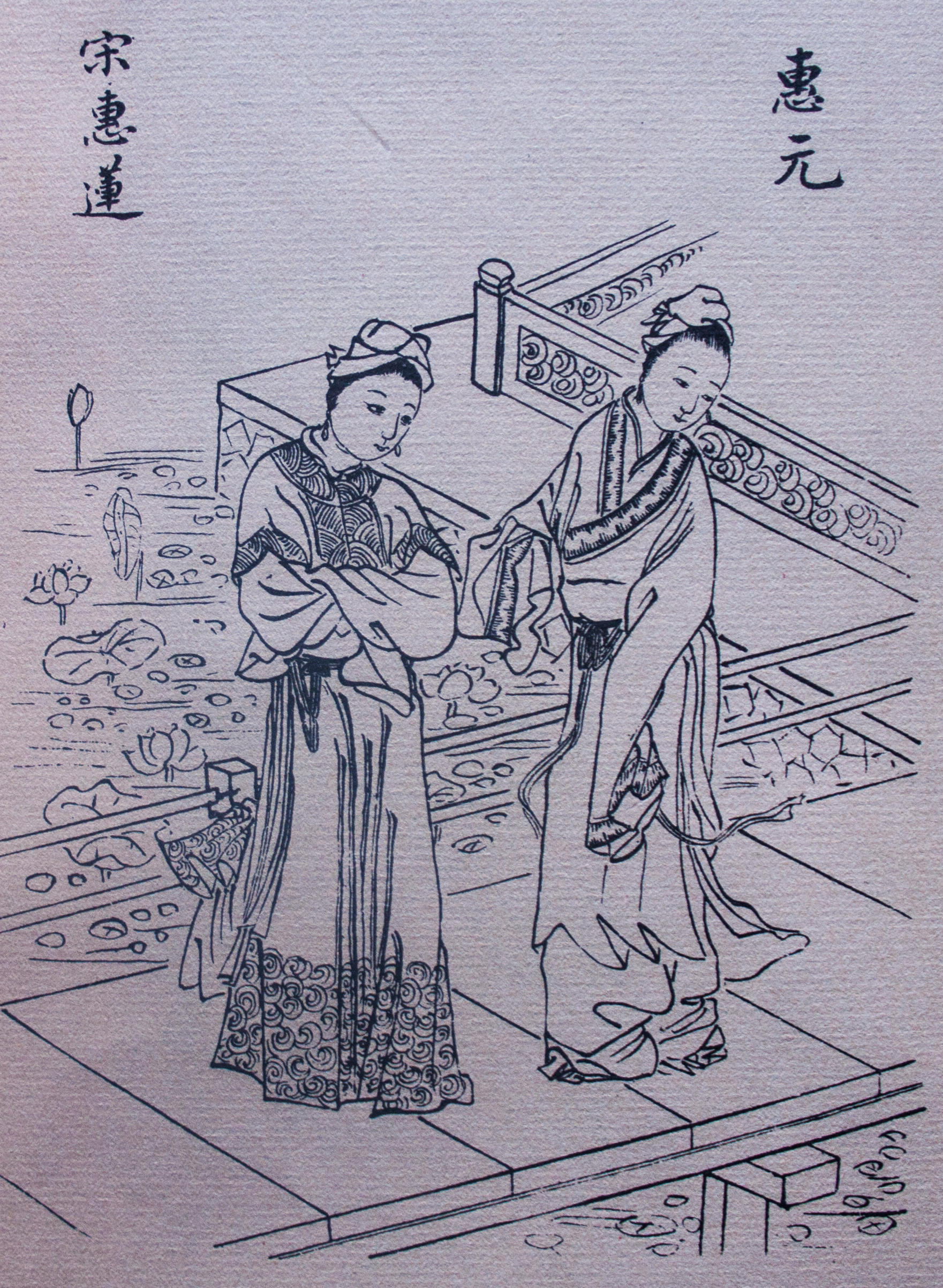
Illustration from the novel Jin Ping Mei, 17th century

In 1566, Tan Kai, a retired official and bibliophile, published Extensive Records of the Taiping Reign (Taiping Guangji), a collection of seven thousand mostly supernatural stories from the early Song dynasty. This collection revived many Tang and older stories and tales. During this time, writers edited and published both old and new stories, as well as short story collections. Some notable examples include Wang Tonggui's Tales Overheard (Ertan, 1597), Su Changzuo's Complete Records of Yanshan (Yanshan Conglu, 1602), and Qian Xiyan's Garden of Cleverness (Kaiyuan, 1613), which gained great popularity. Song Maocheng and Pan Zhiheng wrote stories in the classical language, while Ling Mengchu and Feng Menglong wrote in the colloquial language. Around 1590, the genre of novels in colloquial language, which was rare at the time, began to flourish. Two notable novels from the Wanli era were Journey to the West, one of the Four Classic Chinese Novels, and the socio-critical Jin Ping Mei. Additionally, Luo Maodeng's 1597 novel The Eunuch Sanbao's Voyage to the Western Ocean (Sanbao Taijian Xiyang Ji) was the first work to impress readers with the size of Zheng He's "treasure ships".

The development of drama was greatly influenced by Liang Chenyu, who incorporated the Kunshan style of music, known as Kunqu, into his drama Washing Silken Gauze (浣紗記; Huan Sha Ji). This combination of Kunqu music and Chuanqi dramatic form was a huge success, leading to the merging of the two concepts. In the following decades, numerous authors and plays emerged. Private theater troupes held the most prestigious position in the theater world. The wealthy employed these troupes for their own entertainment and that of their guests. Among the playwrights, Tang Xianzu was particularly notable for his "four dream plays", with his work The Peony Pavilion being highly regarded. Another important playwright of the Wanli era was Zheng Zhizhen, who adapted the popular story Mulian Rescues His Mother (Mulian Jiu Mu Xing Xiao Xi Wen) into a theatrical form. Of Shen Jing's dramas, only the play The Noble Knight-Errant (Yixia Ji, an adaptation of one of the chapters of Water Margin) succeeded, yet he became an important theoretician. His followers are known as the Wujiang School. In theory, he emphasized the role of music, which he considered more important than the textual component of the play (Tang Xianzu defended the opposite opinion). Zang Maoxun compiled the Anthology of Yuan Plays (Yuanqu Xuan), which became the basic source of Yuan zaju dramas for four centuries. The plays in Zang's anthology do not have an original form, with Zang significantly modifying them in accordance with late Ming values and artistic attitudes.

=== Books, the book market, and newspapers ===
In the early 16th century, printed literature prevailed over manuscript literature, leading to an explosive expansion of written texts. Compared to Europe, paper was cheap in China and woodblock printing did not require a large initial investment, allowing for the rapid spread of printed literature of various kinds and genres. Europeans such as Matteo Ricci noted the abundance of books during the Wanli era. Ricci marveled at the wealth of literary resources in China. While books were generally affordable, rare prints could still be quite expensive, costing up to a hundred liangs of silver. The widespread availability of books also led to an increase in leisure reading, as people were not only reading for work, but also for pleasure. According to European visitors, literacy was widespread in China, with even the poorest families having access to education and the ability to read and write. This resulted in a larger number of people reading books in China and around the world than ever before.

The book market grew exponentially. In the early 16th century, the market was relatively limited and focused mainly on Confucian classics, official histories, and neo-Confucian philosophers. These books were printed in princely palaces, offices, and commercially, with a particular concentration in Fujian, specifically in Jianning Prefecture in the northern part of the province. In the Wanli era, commercial publishers began printing a wide range of literature in hopes of making a profit. This included not only the aforementioned official literature, but also various genres of fiction, encyclopedias, and manuals of all kinds. These ranged from "pocket classics" for students to guides on how to become a writer or lead the country. The market was also flooded with manuals and encyclopedias on household management. By the end of the century, fiction had become extremely popular. The affordability of printing allowed for the distribution of specialized books, such as medical texts, which had previously only been available in manuscript form.

The most significant regions for book production were Suzhou, Fujian, and Zhejiang. Suzhou was known for printing the highest quality and most expensive books, while Fujian produced the largest quantity at the lowest cost. Zhejiang ranked second in both aspects. The growth and commercialization of the book market encouraged academics to publish their own work, a departure from the previous practice of having their students or descendants publish for them. Esteemed scholars could rely on publishers to pay them in advance for their writing, with the expectation of making a profit. This led to the emergence of scholars who focused solely on writing and publishing.

Private libraries were growing in size. During the Song dynasty, it was rare for someone to have a library with ten thousand juan (chapters), but during the Wanli era, private libraries in Jiangnan had 30,000 to 50,000 juan. Some scholars, like Ge Jian from Yangzhou, even had 10,000 titles in their personal collections (with each title possibly costing several tens of juan). There were dozens of these extensive private libraries in existence. Due to their size, many of these large private libraries were housed in separate buildings. For example, the famous bibliophile Mao Kun's library had twelve rooms. These impressive private libraries were a source of amazement for Europeans.

Private newspapers also began to emerge during this time. Initially, they mainly republished material from the official gazette, but eventually they started to produce their own news. As early as the 1590s, former minister Yu Shenxing (于慎行) expressed concern that newspaper publishers were exaggerating the failures of the fighting on the northern border, causing unnecessary panic among the population. He criticized their focus on sensational news for the sake of marketability and profit, rather than reporting on truly important events.

=== Imperial examinations ===
Candidates for the imperial examinations crowd to see the results posted on the wall; detail from a handscroll by Qiu Ying (1494–1552).

Only individuals with official status were able to ensure the preservation of a merchant family's wealth. Merchants often encouraged their sons to pursue education and obtain an official rank. During the first two centuries of the Ming dynasty, only candidates from families of officials, peasants (or landowners), craftsmen, and soldiers were allowed to take the civil service examinations. Merchants were not permitted to participate. In the Wanli era, merchants were finally allowed to participate in the imperial examinations, but only one candidate, Zheng Maohua in 1607, was able to pass the highest level of the examinations, known as the palace examination, and obtain the jinshi rank. (Note: Over the course of three centuries, a total of 22,404 men were awarded the title of jinshi during the Ming dynasty. Out of these, 14,756 were registered as farmers (specifically landowners), 5,372 came from soldier families, 808 from bureaucratic families, 801 from artisan families, and only one was mentioned as being from a merchant family. The origins of the remaining 657 jinshi are unknown.) Merchants still managed to pass the examinations by registering under the names of others or posing as peasants or soldiers from a different location. In the late Ming period, the majority of successful examination candidates came from merchant families.

In the students' environment, the eight-legged essay was an important genre, and mastery of it was crucial for success in examinations. This literary form emerged in the Wanli era and gained popularity over the course of a century. It was not yet rigid and was seen as a challenge for intellectuals to showcase their stylistic dexterity. Esteemed art critics like Li Zhi and Yuan Hongdao valued this genre for its experimental and innovative nature, but mastering the eight-legged essay required more than just individual study. Examiners' favored preferences and styles were constantly changing, giving an advantage to candidates from larger cities who could keep up with these trends. Hence, membership in literary societies was beneficial to students. In the 1570s, these societies began publishing successful essays with commentary and criticism. (Note: Collections of essays by leading scholars (such as Wang Ao) have been published since the end of the 15th century.) Additionally, the authorities published collections of model essays starting in 1587.

The study was costly; for example, Wang Shizhen spent 300 liang (11.2 kg) of silver per year on his studies. Even the poorest candidates had to cover at least a third of the cost, often resulting in debt. After being appointed to office, officials had to use their salaries to pay off creditors, who were often wealthy merchants, but official salaries were not high, with county magistrates only earning 87 liang per year in the 16th century.

In 1583, the government tightened control over provincial examinations by selecting chief examiners and their deputies from members of the Hanlin Academy. Previously, these positions were held by teachers in charge of county and prefectural state schools, who typically only passed the provincial examinations. (Note: At that time, only 2–3% of candidates were able to pass the provincial examinations.)

=== Fashion ===
In the early Ming period, the state determined the style, materials, and color of clothing. As early as 1541, the Ministry of Rites prohibited inappropriate styles of dress. By the 1560s, these prohibitions were no longer being enforced and people began to dress according to ever-changing fashion trends. The city of Suzhou became the center of fashion and set the trends for the rest of the country. This distinction between appropriate and inappropriate extended beyond clothing to items of daily use and household equipment. The arbiters of taste and elegance condemned the ostentatious display of wealth, such as the use of gold utensils and dishes, as vulgar behavior of the uneducated wealthy. This behavior was becoming more common due to the influx of silver from abroad, which led to the enrichment of merchants who surpassed landowners in terms of wealth and extravagant spending. These "nouveau riche" individuals sought social recognition, but the traditional elites fought back and tried to maintain their upper hand. One of their tactics was the institution of fashion. In the last decade of the Wanli era, the fear of the wealth and influence of the "nouveau riche" reached its peak. On the other hand, from the 1590s onwards, writers from the gentry class produced manuals instructing the ignorant on what objects and antiques were appropriate to own and how to properly dispose of them in accordance with cultural norms. The counterfeiting of antiquities and valuables also became widespread. Fashion was also intertwined with sexual relations, as educated and cultured courtesans like Xue Susu and Ma Shouzhen emerged, breaking free from the traditional role of women being limited to the household. A trend for sexual relations with boys also emerged among the elite, openly defying Confucian norms.

== Conversion table ==
Wanli	1	2	3	4	5	6	7	8	9	10
AD	1573	1574	1575	1576	1577	1578	1579	1580	1581	1582
Wanli	11	12	13	14	15	16	17	18	19	20
AD	1583	1584	1585	1586	1587	1588	1589	1590	1591	1592
Wanli	21	22	23	24	25	26	27	28	29	30
AD	1593	1594	1595	1596	1597	1598	1599	1600	1601	1602
Wanli	31	32	33	34	35	36	37	38	39	40
AD	1603	1604	1605	1606	1607	1608	1609	1610	1611	1612
Wanli	41	42	43	44	45	46	47	48		
AD	1613	1614	1615	1616	1617	1618	1619	1620		
