= 16th century in philosophy =

This is a timeline of philosophy in 16th century.

== Events ==
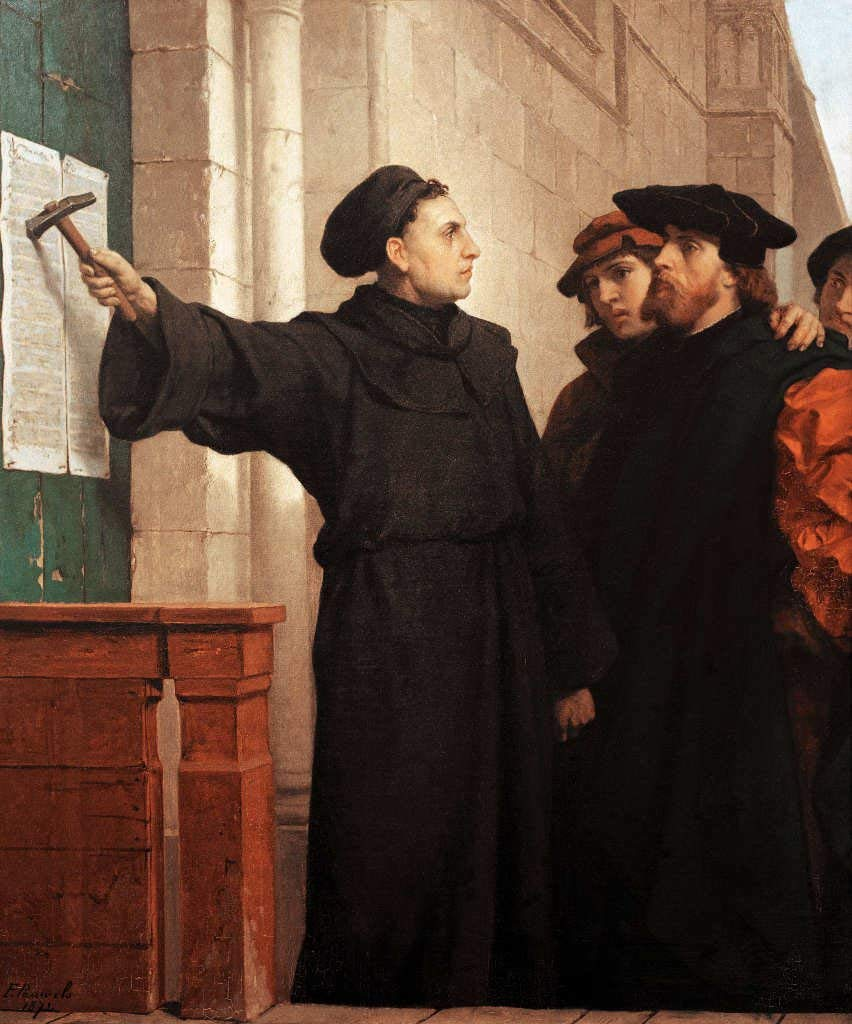
1872 painting of Martin Luther hammering his Ninety-five Theses to the door of a church, by Ferdinand Pauwels

- 1517 – Martin Luther hammers his Ninety-five Theses to the door of a church in Wittenberg, Germany, an event which would mark the start of the Protestant Reformation.
- 1526 – In On the Causes of Natural Effects or On Incantations, Italian philosopher Pietro Pomponazzi argues that miracles produced by angels and demons can be instead explained by natural causes.
- 1540 – The Society of Jesus is founded by Ignatius of Loyola and his six companions, which would play an important role in the second revival of scholasticism.
- 1543 – Nicolaus Copernicus theorizes in De revolutionibus orbium coelestium that the earth revolves around the sun, challenging the Ptolemaic system.
- 1563 – The Council of Trent holds their final session, reaffirming thomist scholasticism as central to the Catholic theology, prompting significant debate between Protestants and Catholics.

== Publications ==
- Adagia by Desiderius Erasmus Roterodamus
- Discourse on Voluntary Servitude by Étienne de La Boétie
- Disputationes Metaphysicae by Francisco Suárez
- Institutes of the Christian Religion by John Calvin
- Dialoghi d'amore by Judah Leon Abrabanel
- The Prince by Niccolò Machiavelli
- De revolutionibus orbium coelestium by Nicolaus Copernicus
- Tantrasamgraha by Nilakantha Somayaji

== Births ==
- 1504 – Janardan Swami, Indian Hindu scholar, statesman, poet, and saint.
- 1508 – Gemma Frisius, Dutch physician, mathematician, cartographer, philosopher, and instrument maker.
- 1511 – Tulsidas, Indian Hindu saint and poet.
- 1520 – Appayya Dikshita, Indian Hindu philosopher.
- 1527 – Raghuttama Tirtha, Indian philosopher, scholar, theologian, and saint.
- 1528 – Pedro da Fonseca, Portuguese Jesuit philosopher and theologian.
- 1530 – Jean Bodin, French jurist and political philosopher.
- 1530 – Étienne de La Boétie, French judge, writer, and philosopher.
- 1533 – Michel de Montaigne, French philosopher.
- 1534 – Guru Ram Das, Sikh guru.
- 1541 – Uddharan Dutta Thakur, Indian philosopher and saint.
- 1540 – Madhusūdana Sarasvatī, Indian philosopher.
- 1544 – Dadu Dayal, Indian poet-saint religious reformer.
- 1548 – Francisco Suárez, Spanish priest, philosopher, and theologian.
- 1548 – Giordano Bruno, Italian philosopher, poet, alchemist, astronomer, cosmological theorist, and esotericist.
- 1550 – Mian Mir, Pakistani Sufi Muslim saint.
- 1560 – Sheikh Muhammad, Indian Muslim saint-poet.
- 1561 – Francis Bacon, English philosopher and statesman.
- 1563 – Guru Arjan, Sikh guru.
- 1564 – Ahmad Sirhindi, Indian Islamic scholar, Hanafi jurist, and member of the Naqshbandī Sufi order.
- 1564 – Galileo Galilei, Italian polymath.
- 1571/72 – Mulla Sadra, Persian Twelver Shi'i Islamic mystic, philosopher, theologian, and ‘Ālim
- 1571 – Lakshmi Kumara Tatacharya, Indian Hindu saint and guru.
- 1574 – Robert Fludd, English Paracelsian physician.
- 1575 – Sabatino de Ursis, Italian Jesuit.
- 1575 – Jakob Böhme, German philosopher, Christian mystic, and Lutheran Protestant theologian.
- 1576 – Caspar Schoppe, German catholic controversialist and scholar.
- 1588 – Thomas Hobbes, English philosopher.
- 1588 – Marin Mersenne, French polymath.
- 1589 – John of St. Thomas, Portuguese Dominican friar, Thomist theologian, and professor of philosophy.

== Deaths ==
- 1508 – Keian Genju, Japanese Buddhist priest and Confucian scholar.
- 1512 – Alessandro Achillini, Italian philosopher and physician.
- 1517 – Marcus Musurus, Greek scholar and philosopher.
- 1518 – Kabir, Indian mystic poet and sant.
- 1529 – Wang Yangming, Chinese philosopher and general
- 1530 – Judah Leon Abravanel, Portuguese-Jewish, philosopher, physician, and poet.
- 1530 – Vallabha, Indian Hindu saint and philosopher.
- 1534 – Chaitanya Mahaprabhu, Indian saint.
- 1535 – Thomas More, English politician, author, and philosopher.
- 1536 – Erasmus of Rotterdam, Dutch Catholic priest, theologian, educationalist, satirist, and philosopher.
- 1539 – Vyasatirtha, Hindu philosopher, scholar, polemicist, commentator, and poet.
- 1540 – Juan Luis Vives, Spanish humanist and scholar.
- 1541 – Jahnava Devi, Indian Hindu philosopher and saint.
- 1541 – Wang Gen, Chinese Neo-Confucian philosopher.
- 1542 – Ghyath al-Din Mansur Dashtaki, Iranian Islamic philosopher.
- 1546 – Francisco de Vitoria, Spanish philosopher.
- 1547 – Raghunatha Siromani, Indian philosopher and logician.
- 1548 – Pedro Ciruelo, Spanish scholar.
- 1552 – Guru Angad, Indian Sikh guru.
- 1555 – Gemma Frisius, Dutch physician, mathematician, cartographer, philosopher, and instrument maker.
- 1556 – Tullia d'Aragona, Italian poet, author, and philosopher.
- 1557 – Raghuvarya Tirtha, Indian Hindu philosopher, scholar, theologian and saint.
- 1558 – Juan de Celaya, Spanish scholar.
- 1560 – Melchor Cano, Spanish Scholastic theologian.
- 1563 – Étienne de La Boétie, French judge, writer, and philosopher.
- 1564 – Purandara Dasa, Indian composer, singer, Haridasa philosopher.
- 1564 – Rupa Goswami, Indian guru, poet, and philosopher.
- 1574 – Guru Amar Das, Indian Sikh guru.
- 1575 – Janardan Swami, Indian Hindu scholar, statesman, poet and saint.
- 1583 – Wang Ji, Chinese philosopher and writer.
- 1584 – Gerhard Dorn, Belgian philosopher, translator, alchemist, physician and bibliophile.
- 1588 – Luo Rufang, Chinese philosopher.
- 1588 – Bernardino Telesio, Italian philosopher and natural scientist.
- 1590 – Dirck Coornhert, Dutch writer, philosopher, translator, politician, theologian, and artist.
- 1593 – Appayya Dikshita, Hindu philosopher.
- 1595 – Raghuttama Tirtha, Indian philosopher, scholar, theologian and saint.
- 1597 – Franciscus Patricius, Italian philosopher.

== See also ==
- List of centuries in philosophy
- Renaissance
