= Wang Ji (philosopher) =

Chinese philosopher and writer (1498–1583)

- Traditional Chinese: 王畿
Transcriptions
Standard Mandarin
- Hanyu Pinyin: Wáng Jǐ

Longxi (courtesy name)
- Chinese: 龍溪
Transcriptions
Standard Mandarin
- Hanyu Pinyin: Lóngxī

Longxi Xiansheng (art name)
- Chinese: 龍溪先生
Transcriptions
Standard Mandarin
- Hanyu Pinyin: Lóngxī Xiānshēng

Wang Ji (1498 – 1583), courtesy name Longxi, was a Chinese philosopher and writer during the Ming dynasty. He is commonly regarded as one of the most important Neo-Confucian thinkers in the school of Wang Yangming, along with Wang Gen.

== Life ==
Wang Ji hailed from Shanyin (山陰) County in Shaoxing (紹興) Prefecture, Zhejiang. He became a student of Wang Yangming fairly early in his life, eventually numbering among his most important disciples, contributing important parts to their collective posthumous records of Yangming's life and thought. After Yangming's death, Wang Ji tended associate himself with the nascent members of the Taizhou school, rather than the quietist and orthodox interpretations of his master's thought.

== Philosophy ==
=== Beyond Good and Evil ===
Wang Longxi interpreted his teacher's summarization of his own teachings into the "Four Sentences" into his own form, the "Four Nothings" (四無), which stated that "If we realize that the mind is the mind which is neither good nor evil, that intention is intention which is neither good nor evil, that knowledge is knowledge which is neither good nor evil, and that things are things which are neither good nor evil, then the mindless mind is concealed in the secret, the intentionless intention responds perfectly, knowledgeless knowledge is embodied in quiescence, and thingless things function spiritually." (若悟得心是無善無惡之心﹐意即是無善無惡之意﹐知即是無善無惡之知﹐物即是無善無惡之物。蓋無心之心則藏密﹐無意之意則應圓﹐無知之知則體寂﹐無物之物則用神。) This teaching is intended to obliterate the difference between subject and object, entering the mind of no-mind. Longxi assumed that if, according to Wang Yangming, the mind is without good or evil, then all thoughts, volition, and intuitive knowing should be likewise.

According to Wang Longxi, Wang Yangming said that "If one can realize the original substance in which there is neither good nor evil, one will know what absolute Nothing is. And then all will, knowledge, and things will emerge from Nothing. Once this is done, it settles everything. Effort is substance. This truth is simple and direct. It is neither too much nor too little. This is the secret to be passed from one mind to another."

=== Intuitive Knowledge ===
Wang developed his teacher's concept of intuitive knowing (良知, liangzhi) into three essential aspects: solitary knowledge (獨知, duzhi), primal knowledge (乾知, qianzhi), and knowledge free or thought and action (無思無為, wusi wuwei). Longxi believed that in solitary knowledge, "nothing is not original. It is invisible and inaudible, and is the foundation of liang chih. It is through this foundation that appearance and invisibility (reality), substance and function, are interfused and non-differentiated." Solitary knowledge knows itself without being attached to anything (including itself), it is called knowledge of the solitary. According to the Yijing, "To know the great beginning is primal knowledge." Longxi explained that "One who is equipped with primal knowledge is strong, persistent, tranquil, and correct, because primal knowledge is the origin of all this." Knowledge free of thought and action is pure illumination through direct spontaneity, perfect in both action and stillness, beyond being and nonbeing. These three aspects of intuitive knowledge form the base teaching of Wang Longxi.

Intuitive knowing is to be distinguished, according to Longxi, from the volitional ideas and passing thoughts which make up one's ordinary perception of the universe. In this way, one may abolish all ordinary consciousness in the intuitive knowing beyond all transient thoughts, ideas, good, and evil. In the emptiness of liangzhi, expressions of good may arise, but they will inevitably pass like an echo, leaving only the void of intuitive knowing.

=== Direct Realization ===
For Wang Longxi, the apprehension of Nothingness and intuitive knowing occurs by means of "the mind of the absolute present" (見在心, jianzaixin), saying that "When the mind is in the absolute present it will be free from the departing of the past and the coming of the future, and will be unified." The absolute present is the moment in the now which is beyond deliberation or thought, and is simply spontaneous action.

Longxi distinguished between precosmic (先天, xiantian) and postcosmic (後天, houtian) knowledge. Postcosmic knowledge arises in the mind when there is still conceptual thinking (i.e., when the mind has not yet apprehended liangzhi). It is equivalent with making the will sincere, which Longxi characterized as Wang Yangming's teaching. Precosmic knowing is prior to conceptual thinking, pure knowing "which is Nothing as well as being, unexpressed as well as always expressing, beyond the distinction of good and evil, and the supreme good." The only thing to be done is to let the mind stand as it is in its right position, which is actually no position, since the mind is universal being, as well as universal Nothing. The introduction of these two methods of realization, one of which is direct (precosmic) and the other provisional (postcosmic), led to Longxi's synthesis of Chan Buddhism, Daoism, and Neo-Confucian thought as individual methods of apprehending Nothingness.

Criticizing the faults of postcosmic teachings, Longxi noted that their students would become inevitably attached to them, despite their provisionality. Thus, the secret key is the spontaneous functioning free of preconception or attachment and appropriate to every circumstance. In accordance with Wang Ji's doctrine of original substance, i.e., direct enlightenment, original substance must be identical with effort, realization with cultivation, and nature with effort. He concluded that, should there be even a bit of discrepancy between these, the way of unity and oneness would be lost.

== Influence and criticism ==
Wang Yangming considered Wang Ji's ideas on intuitive knowing beyond good or evil to be those of the student of keen intelligence, while the views of other students who emphasized the moral character of passing thoughts were to instruct those of lesser knowing. However, he warned Longxi that "You should not show your interpretation to people. You cannot readily expect from them full realization of the unity of the original substance of the mind and effort. For it is not easy to find people of keen intelligence in this world. Otherwise they will imagine an original substance in a vacuum. Whatever they do will not be genuine. They will do no more than cultivate a mind of vacuity and quietness, and will make the mistake of skipping over [not following the proper steps]."

In general, the schools of Wang Ji and the Taizhou school of Wang Gen were the only traditions of Yangmingist thought which adapted themselves to the romantic, emotional, and sensual mood of the late Ming dynasty, which was represented by such works as the novel the Golden Lotus (among many other vernacular dramas and novels centered around passion and emotion), the poetry of Yuan Hongdao, the painting of Xu Wei, and the calligraphy of Dong Qichang. The important late Ming individualist thinker Li Zhi's philosophy was heavily inspired by the thought of Wang Yangming and Wang Ji, particularly in the form of his conception of the "childlike mind".

Huang Zongxi believed that Wang Ji distorted and corrupted the teachings of Wang Yangming through addition of Chan Buddhist elements.
