= A Book to Burn =

16th century philosophical work by Li Zhi

A Book to Burn (simplified Chinese: 焚书; traditional Chinese: 焚書) is a late 16th-century philosophical work by the late-Ming Dynasty thinker and historian Li Zhi. A critique of the social, philosophical and cultural norms of his time, the book was highly controversial and cemented Li Zhi's reputation as a heretic at the time.

== History ==
Li Zhi began compiling the book in 1588, while living in a Buddhist monastery. It was first published in 1590 in Macheng, with a foreword by Mei Guozhen.

The title was chosen by Li Zhi, who was aware that the book would be highly controversial, and that calls for its burning would be inevitable. Indeed, soon after its publication, it incited a vitriolic response from the exponents of Cheng-Zhu orthodoxy, accusing Li of heresy and poisoning minds; this controversy, however, only served to heighten Li Zhi's reputation.

In 1602, after the imprisonment and suicide of Li Zhi, the book was proscribed and all copies were burned; this ban proceeded even into the Qing Dynasty. Yet, while officially banned, it continued to be printed and distributed in private.

== Contents ==
The book is divided into six chapters. Chapters one and two are responses to other books and philosophical works, while chapters three and four are essays on assorted topics. Chapter five deals with the study of history, and the last chapter contains poetic works.

The book contains Li's defences of the School of Heart, influenced by the teachings of the earlier scholar Wang Yangming, against the Cheng-Zhu school. Among other arguments, it derided the ritual worship of Confucius as superstition, as well as the study of the classics in pursuit of understanding an 'absolute morality'. Instead, Li argued for a more intuitive understanding of virtue and morality, and of giving greater space for individualism, instead of 'taking Confucius' (idea of) right or wrong as the only idea of right or wrong'.
