= Janardan Swami =

Indian scholar

Personal life
- Born: c. 1504 Chalisgaon, Khandesh Sultanate
- Died: c. 1575 Daulatabad, Ahmadnagar Sultanate

Religious life
- Religion: Hinduism
- Order: Anand Sampradaya

Religious career
- Teacher: Nagababa
- Disciples: Eknath, Ramajanardana, Janijanardana

Janardan Swami (c. 1504 - c. 1575) was an Indian Hindu scholar, statesman, poet and saint. He was the spiritual guru of prominent 16th-century Hindu saint Eknath. His compositions were mostly written in Marathi language. He also wrote a few verses in Braj language.

== Biography ==
Janardan Swami was born into a Deshastha Rigvedi Brahmin family at Chalisgaon, a town in present-day Maharashtra. His family were believed to be adherants of the Ashvalayana Sutra, a collection of Indian texts detailing domestic rituals for householders. His parents belonged to the Shakala Shakha, a branch of the Rigvedic tradition. They also subscribed to Advaita Vedanta, the school of thought initiated by 8th-century Indian philosopher Adi Shankaracharya.

Janardan Swami was a devotee of Dattatreya, a Hindu deity. He held the position of killedar or governor of the fort at Daulatabad. According to legend, Dattatreya once held a conversation with Janardan Swami inside a cave within the fort perimeters at Daulatabad. It is believed that during one of his visits to Ankalakopa, the deity once again appeared before Janardan Swami as Narasimha Saraswati, who was an earlier saint and spiritual master, also considered to be the second incarnation of Dattatreya. He is claimed to have initiated Janardan Swami under a cluster fig (audumbara) tree. Janardan Swami had disciples belonging to various social classes. Among his disciples, Eknath is considered to be the most significant, and Ramajanardana and Janijanardana are his other prominent disciples.

Few details of his life are known. On one occasion, he instructed Eknath to embark on a pilgrimage. He accompanied his disciple until Trimbakeshwar, a Hindu pilgrimage town near Nashik, Maharashtra. He composed considerable volumes of devotional poetry known as abhanga.

He died at Daulatabad, where he is believed to have undergone Mahasamadhi. A samadhi or shrine commemorating Janardan Swami is located within a cave on a hill at Daulatabad.

== See also ==
- Eknath, his principal disciple
- Dnyaneshwar
- Namdev
