= Li Zhi (philosopher) =

Chinese philosopher (1527–1602)

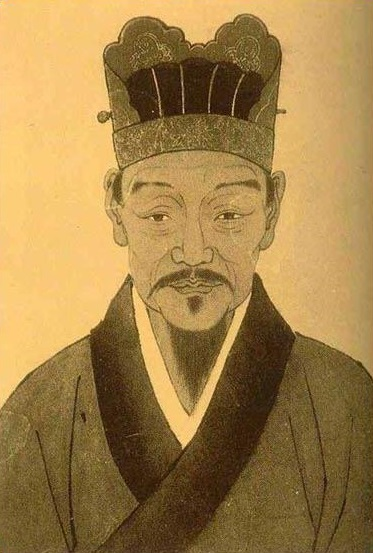
- Born: 1527; Jinjiang, Fujian province, Ming dynasty
- Died: 1602 (aged 74–75)
- Occupations: Lecturer, philosopher, politician

Philosophical work
- Era: Medieval philosophy
- Region: Chinese philosophy
- School: Yangmingism

Chinese name
- Traditional Chinese: 李贄
- Simplified Chinese: 李贽
Transcriptions
Standard Mandarin
- Hanyu Pinyin: Lǐ Zhì
Yue: Cantonese
- Yale Romanization: Léih Zi
- Jyutping: Lei5 Zi3

Lin Zaizhi
- Chinese: 林載贄
Transcriptions
Standard Mandarin
- Hanyu Pinyin: Lín Zàizhì
Yue: Cantonese
- Yale Romanization: Làhm Jai Ji
- Jyutping: Lam4 Zoi3 Zi3

Hongfu (courtesy name)
- Chinese: 宏甫
Transcriptions
Standard Mandarin
- Hanyu Pinyin: Hóngfǔ
Yue: Cantonese
- Yale Romanization: Wòhng Fú
- Jyutping: Wong4 Fu2

Zhuowu (art name)
- Chinese: 卓吾
Transcriptions
Standard Mandarin
- Hanyu Pinyin: Zhuówú
Yue: Cantonese
- Yale Romanization: Cheuk Ǹgh
- Jyutping: Coek3 Ng4

Li Zhi (1527–1602), often known by his pseudonym Zhuowu (which means, "I who am smart"), was a Chinese philosopher, historian and writer of the late Ming dynasty. A critic of the Neo-Confucianist views espoused by Zhu Xi, which was then the orthodoxy of the Ming government, he was persecuted and committed suicide in prison.

== Biography ==
Li Zhi was born in Jinjiang, Fujian province (in modern Quanzhou). His ancestor by seven generations was Lin Nu, the son of Li Lü, a maritime merchant. Lin Nu visited Hormuz in Persia in 1376, converted to Islam upon marriage to a Semu girl (娶色目女) (who was most likely either Persian or Arab), and brought her back to Quanzhou. This was recorded in the Lin and Li genealogy (林李宗譜). However, the new faith did not take root in his lineage and the family stopped practising Islam during the time of his grandfather. His father made a living by teaching, and Li Zhi was therefore educated from an early age.

In 1551, he passed the village examinations, and five years later was appointed as a lecturer in Gongcheng (in modern Huixian, Henan Province). In 1560 he was then promoted to the Guozijian in Nanjing as a professor, but went into filial mourning, returning to his native Quanzhou. During this time he participated in the defence of the coastal city against Wokou raids. After returning from mourning in 1563, he was assigned to the Guozijian in Beijing.

In 1566, he served in the Ministry of Rites in Beijing, where he became learned in Yangmingism as well as Buddhist thought. He was then assigned as a prefect of Yao'an County in Yunnan in 1577, but left his post three years later. After this, he took up a teaching post in Hubei on the invitation of Geng Dingli, but was attacked as a heretic by Dingli's brother, the scholar and official Geng Dingxiang, and eventually moved to Macheng. In 1588, he took the tonsure and became a Buddhist monk, but did not follow the ascetic lifestyle of other monks. Two years later, his work A Book to Hide was printed.

Li travelled during the 1590s, visiting Jining and Nanjing, where he met with Matteo Ricci and discussed the differences between Buddhist and Catholic thought. Returning to Macheng in 1600, he was again forced to leave after attacks from the local magistrate for his philosophical views.

He has been credited with commentaries to Romance of the Three Kingdoms, Journey to the West, and Water Margin, as well as to the plays Romance of the Western Chamber and Tale of the Pipa; of these, only the preface to Water Margin has been established as the product of his brush.

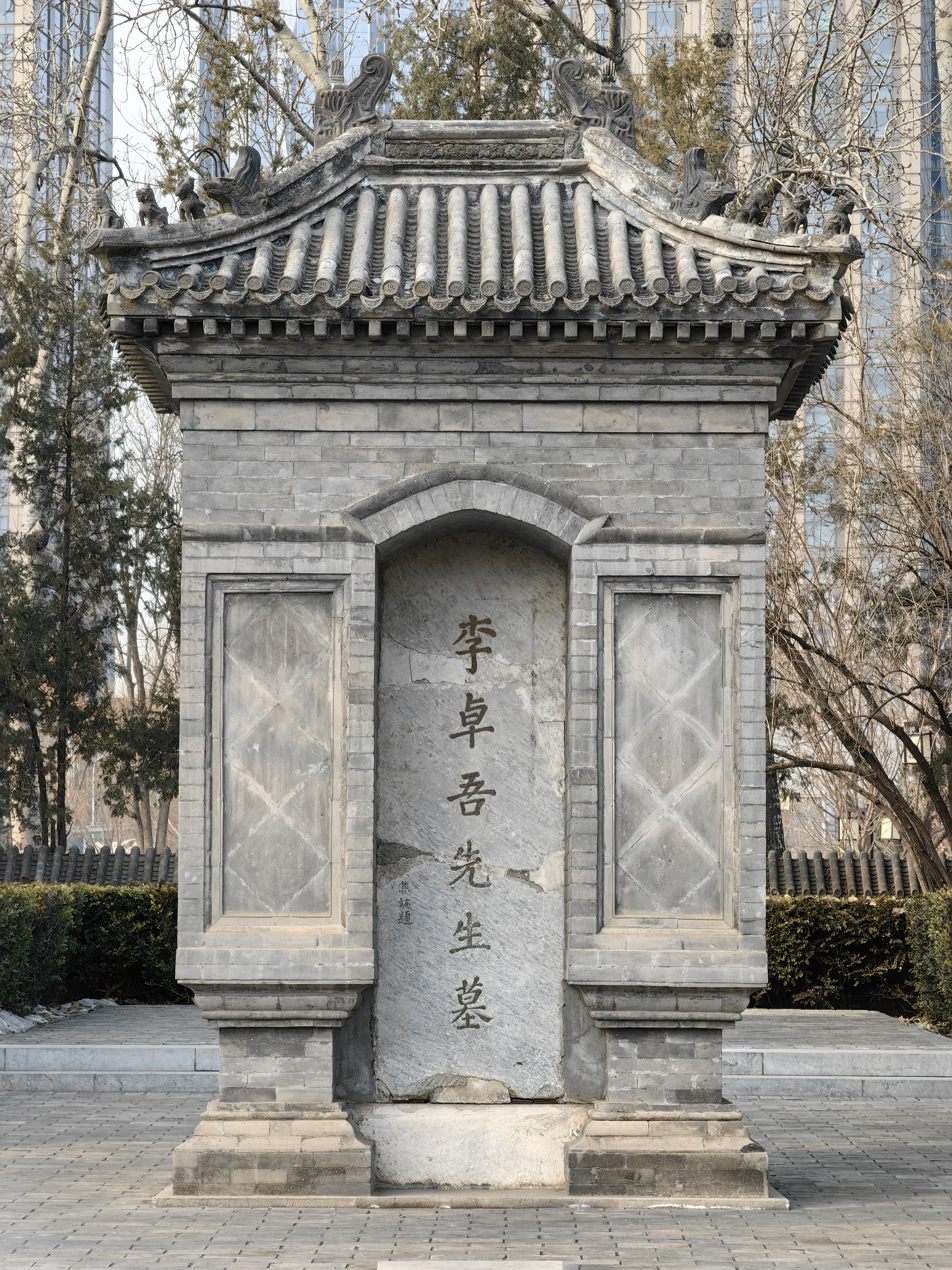
Tomb of Li Zhi

In 1602, after being accused of deceiving society with heretical ideas by Zhang Wenda and other officials of the Censorate, he was arrested and imprisoned, where he committed suicide. Having heard that he was to be exiled to his native Fujian, he cut his throat with a shaving knife which he seized from a servant. After his death, he was buried in Tongzhou, where his grave still remains.

== Philosophy ==
Li Zhi's philosophy was based upon Neo-Confucianism, though he was a staunch critic of the then-orthodox Cheng-Zhu School, and indeed identified himself as a heretic. He can be seen as having been influenced by Wang Yangming (1472–1529), as well as the Taizhou School. He denied that women were inferior to men in native intelligence, and argued that many women in Chinese history, such as Wu Zetian, had actually been superior to men. However, he did not believe women should be emancipated and commended widows who chose suicide over remarriage.

The childlike heart-mind

The childlike heart-mind is the genuine heart-mind. If one denies the childlike heart-mind, then he denies the genuine heart-mind. The childlike heart-mind is free of all falsehood and entirely genuine; it is the original mind at the very beginning of the first thought. -Li Zhi, "On the Childlike Heart-Mind"

Li Zhi wrote a considerable amount on the "childlike heart-mind" (tóng xīn; 童心). Although someone of a childlike heart-mind was once considered to be someone "naive, immature, and inexperienced in the ways of the world" – and thus "bound to come to a bad end" – Li uses the term in a different sense, as evidenced by his reference to the 13th-century play The Western Chamber. In this play, a scholar and a maiden develop a somewhat "forbidden" relationship, have a clandestine and passionate love affair, push through "traditional barriers" to their love, and finally marry. In the original telling (from the Tang period, 7th-10th century CE), these same lovers have a short-lived, passionate romance which takes a sharp downward turn when the scholar decides to leave the maiden, leaving them both with no choice but to marry other people, although not out of "true love". In referencing this, Li argues for the ideals of the lovers in the Western Chamber, the "spontaneity, genuineness, abundance in feeling, and passionate desire". These are all aspects of Li's childlike heart-mind.

Li's works on the childlike heart-mind are thought to be "innovative" yet "muddled and inconsistent". Some regard his seemingly incompatible ideas on the heart-mind as a relativist ethical structure "where anything goes." Pauline Lee, however, rejects this interpretation, arguing instead that Li's work is useful in allowing us to understand the cultural milieu in which he lived, and that his "philosophical vision" bears great "intrinsic value and power".

This concept of the childlike heart-mind is not unlike concepts of Li's contemporaries on similar subjects. In fact, Li may have even considered his contemporaries' terms, namely the "original heart-mind" (ben xin), the "genuine heart-mind" (zhen xin), "pure knowing" (liang zhi), and "the infant heart-mind" (chizi zhi xin).

The term "ben xin" comes from a passage in the Mengzi that says that if a person acts in accordance with their "appetitive parts," even if it is to save their own life and even if the decision is difficult for them, then they have "lost contact" with their original heart-mind, something which Mengzi believed is a person's "greatest moral resource." Li Zhi makes a conscious decision not to use this term, preferring instead to use tong xin. This may be due in part to the fact that, while Mengzi believed that the heart-mind was something to be cultivated and nurtured, Li saw the heart-mind as something to be "preserved," since, in his view, it is innately perfect from birth. Mengzi also thought that there was a specific "path of moral self-cultivation" and that those who had followed this path correctly would all have the same ethical attitudes, whereas Li held that there were many different ways that one could cultivate the heart-mind, particularly through the reading of certain texts or engagement in certain practices.

"Zhen xin" is found in the Buddhist text the Platform Sutra, in which it is said to be analogous to the "deep concentration of oneness," something to practice while also maintaining a lack of attachment to things. However, the heart-mind, in this view, runs the risk of becoming enmeshed with the Dao if ever it lingers in anything, if it becomes too attached. Ultimately, the heart-mind in this conception is considered to be functioning properly if it is doing things with natural ease, rather than struggling against the natural way of things (or Dao). Self-cultivation plays a role in this idea of the heart-mind, as well, through deep concentration.

"Liang zhi" comes from Wang Yangming's idea of the heart-mind as something that is known through a discovery-based self-cultivation method and as being "directly manifested in a faculty of ‘pure knowing’" (a term which Mengzi used but which Wang means differently). Wang regarded pure knowing as something innately perfect, just like Li's heart-mind, but which was "clouded over" at birth, akin to the sun being obstructed by clouds. This "clouding" could be caused by one's qi if it had somehow become corrupted or soiled, so the aim was to have clear qi by exercising one's pure knowing, something which could be accomplished only through the will.

"Chizi zhi xin" is a term used by Luo Rufang meaning "infant heart mind". This idea held the "free expression of one's natural desires" in high regard. Luo believed that a person's feelings "are [their] human nature," and so the feelings should not be "repressed" in any way. Spontaneous expression (expression without thinking about it) is also a part of the human nature, and as long as "artificial obstructions" (such as "false teachings or excessive meditation") do not interfere, the feelings can thrive.

To Li, losing the genuine mind could result in losing the genuine self, and anyone who failed to be genuine would never recover their genuine heart-mind. The childlike heart-mind is lost when anything from the outside – be those "aural and visual impressions" (even of the "Principles of the Way"), "knowledge and perceptions," or the favor of a good reputation while masking a bad one – interferes with it. Li also believed that if a person's childlike heart-mind was "obstructed", then whatever that person said would not come from the childlike heart-mind, and so would lack "foundation" and would not be truthful. This is because, "when childlike heart-mind is obstructed, the Principles of the Way that come from outside the self become one's heart-mind." This is a problem because, in this case, everything a person encounters and does with their physical senses is of the Principles of the Way, and so is not arising spontaneously from the childlike heart-mind. Words inspired by the Principles of the Way might sound nice or flow well, Li thought, but they wouldn't have anything to do with the person themselves. Their words would be "phony" and so the person themselves will be "phony", and so too for everyone else until the whole world became like this, eventually leaving people unable to determine between "good" and "bad".

Li felt that the childlike heart-mind's "genuine feelings and desires," as well as the expression of these, could "connect one to an abundant and powerful source" which is too great for "phony" individuals to comprehend. Because of this, such individuals would turn away from opportunities to deepen their spiritual "vision," and face instead a life of comfort and "blindness."

Li notes that early sages had so securely preserved their heart-minds that, when they read and studied the moral teachings of the Principles of the Way, they were able to protect their heart-minds. However, Li was concerned that many students would allow these same teachings to interfere with their heart-minds. This seems contradictory, given that it was the sages themselves who wrote the books of these teachings that, when read and studied, would cause the students to lose their childlike heart-mind. However, Li's justification for this reasoning is that the sages’ teachings were specific to each student, not necessarily to be used universally. He likened the teachings to medicine, not only in that each one is tailored specifically to the "patient's" needs, but also in that what helps one person might worsen the condition of another. For Li, writings such as the Analects and the Six Classics were not to be understood as the "ultimate standard for thousands of generations," because, he proposed, these texts would not then be direct products of the childlike heart-mind.

Although Li does say that the childlike heart-mind cannot return once it is lost, the aforementioned metaphor of "healing" might suggest that anyone is capable of recovering their childlike heart-mind, though perhaps not in its original condition. This is partially because our phoniness is our own doing and our own decision, and therefore is not entirely out of our control. The metaphor also reminds people that this particular kind of "health," the recovery of the heart-mind, is relative. Each individual person has certain things that they need to do in order to remain healthy, and these practices are different from person to person.

=== Ethics ===
Li did not believe in rule-based ethics, but in using one's innate and sensitive "faculty of knowing" (or the "child-like heart-mind") to read and evaluate each situation as it came and to determine from this which action to take. This does not mean that Li regarded all judgments as being entirely subjective. Consistent with his view that one should follow their heart-mind, their most genuine and spontaneous nature, he was highly critical of any actions that were taken or works which were written that did not come from this nature.

While Li advocates for spontaneity and "immediate" action "without prior reflection or thought," this does not mean that he favors completely reckless behavior. For Li, such spontaneity was possible and favorable only because the subject had (ideally) worked to preserve their childlike heart-mind. Without an intact heart-mind, such spontaneous action could be mis- or uninformed.

=== Opinions on fiction writing ===
Many of Li Zhi's contemporaries regarded fiction with disdain; true to form, however, Li disagreed and held it in high esteem. He argued that the "most exquisite literature in the world" comes from the childlike heart-mind because, if something is written from this heart-mind, then nothing is obstructed and no one is "forcing" the "structure" or "style" of their writing. Therefore, if someone composes a written work of fiction that originates from their childlike heart-mind, then this work is indeed "exquisite." He took issue with the more popular idea that "good" prose is that which is written in a "classical" style (such as from the "pre-Qin period"). He claimed that all of the "exquisite" literature from past periods could not be seen through the lenses of their own preceding periods, and that they were notable because they were, indeed, originals. To Li, what defined the quality of certain literature was not the time in which it was written, but rather the faculty within its author from which it arose.

In fact, in general Li vehemently discouraged people from regarding "ideas of antiquity" as solid, "unchanging" truth without first critically examining them, as he believed truth to be "context-dependent" and, therefore, was subject to change with one's environmental variables. He did not believe that people should adhere to "universal truths," since, in his particularist view, there likely were none.

=== The "good death" ===
Li Zhi once wrote to his friend Kong Ruogu regarding his own death, saying, "Under no circumstances should you leave my bones for others to take care of." This is a reference to a passage of Kongzi's on what constitutes a "good death." According to Kongzi, such a death is "genuine in feeling" (therefore not "deceptive"), occurs with friends and loved ones around, and is "supported by relations and rituals constructed by culture," not alone and away from people and social customs. The Xunzi also discusses what constitutes the "good death," describing it as an event which is both "genuine in feeling" and "social in nature." Though Li does not employ the importance of ritual, "formality," "social relations," and "reverence" as part of his own ideas on the "good death," he does incorporate some Confucian aspects of it, namely the qualities of genuineness and "sincere generosity." This comes as no surprise given that Li believed that a necessary quality of a good life is the "[attendance] to our genuine desires".

However, Li acknowledged the roles of culture and social relationships in people's daily lives, and so also believed that this single quality was not enough to secure a good life. In fact, during his periods of mourning, he followed the traditional customs, and appears to have meant it genuinely. For instance, when he returned home to bury both his grandfather and second eldest son, he expressed to Kong Ruogu his guilt over having delayed the burial of his great-grandparents by fifty years. Although this was due to insufficient funds rather than carelessness, Li insists that this is a "crime" for which "nothing can atone," as it goes against "custom".

Among Confucians, disfigurement in death was considered to be unacceptable and something to be avoided. In fact, among Confucian families it was considered a filial duty to keep the body from disfigurement. However, Li writes as if unfazed by the idea, saying that, should he die "on the road" (already an unfavorable death by Confucian standards), he should like for his body to be cremated or thrown into a river.

Having been arrested in Tongzhou for behaving as a heretic and a traitor (such as by bathing with prostitutes and inviting high-class women to attend his various philosophical discussions), Li ultimately decided to die as he awaited his trial. Still in prison, he slit his throat with a razor borrowed from a prison guard, though did not die until two days later. Whether this act was one of desperation or of courage has long been disputed, but Li's friend Yuan Zhongdao notes that, either way, Li's qi ("life energy") must have been considerably robust in order to sustain him for those two days.

Toward the end of his life, Li claimed that his having taken the tonsure did not make him feel that he was living in a way that was "superior" compared to others, as this way of life was, in his words "the only way." His reasons for having done this had nothing to do with its supposed "desirability" or with practicing the Dao, but with his aversion to being controlled. Believing that people are controlled their whole lives – and even after death (such as in burial) – Li chose to break free of this restraint by adopting the tonsure rather than returning home. He writes of this in his essay "Testimony," assuring the reader that this decision was the "genuine intention" of his "original heart," or his childlike heart-mind.

=== Gender equality ===
Confucian feminism focused mainly on self-cultivation as a means of approaching patriarchal issues, primarily through "reading classical texts, writing poetry, engaging in discourse and debate," and "meditation". Li Zhi felt that, because women are inherently just as capable as men are of achieving "intellectual and spiritual development," men and women should both have "opportunities" for self-cultivation available to them.

Pauline Lee describes Li as a "particularist" in that he believes that anyone can "work to achieve" "moral knowledge," but also that all moral judgments are relative to their "specific conditions and time." However, she notes that this does not mean that Li is content to leave women's problems of inequality as they are, as he argues against standard Confucian practices such as the "cloistering of women" in the home, or customs that denounced the remarrying of widows, or the overall subservience of women.

Chinese Confucian cosmology, describing not just the order of the universe but also the order of relationships between people (the latter mirroring and even influencing the former, and vice versa), was one particular area of Confucianism which Li attacked. This cosmology involved the "elements" yin and yang which are often associated with other opposing energies, including masculine and feminine. Lee argued that yin-yang relationships, at least by the third century, were "hierarchical," with yin as yang’s secondary subordinate. While Li maintains the traditional Confucian idea of the cosmos as emanating from one original source, he sees this creation as "cooperative," with yin and yang working together to produce the universe rather than one force being the initiator for the secondary force to follow. He also held the Confucian idea of the family and society as reflections of the cosmos (and vice versa), but again his view was more binary than monistic, believing there to be no hierarchy in creation and, therefore, no hierarchy in male-female or husband-wife relationships. Li also challenges the hierarchical notion of the five essential Confucian relationships (father-son, ruler-subject, husband-wife, old-young, and friend-friend), all of which, aside from friendship, were based on power imbalance. He does this by arguing in his letter "Discussion on Husband and Wife" that societal order is dependent upon the husband-wife relationship as its "ultimate source," and so this particular relationship should be seen as one between friends who have willingly decided to work together.

Not surprisingly, Li had a more egalitarian view of gender relationships than did traditional Confucian thinkers, regarding such relationships as "complementary." He saw men and women as intellectual and spiritual equals, with equal capabilities for self-cultivation in these areas. It is worth it to note that Li did not discuss gender equality in the area of moral development, though this may be due to the fact that, for much of Chinese history, women appeared to have superior moral capacities by nature.

Although the popular belief at the time was that women could not understand the Way due to their supposedly inherent "shortsightedness," Li Zhi disagreed. To Li, someone who is shortsighted is concerned only with what happens within their lifetime, such as the events of their offspring and what happens to their physical body. A farsighted person, however, considers what is beyond that, "transcending" not only the body but also the "superficial appearances of life and death" while also turning their attention away from mindless chatter and prejudices and toward the teachings of the sages, which encouraged a more unbiased perspective.

Li argued that, although men and women are different, their vision is not; that is, there is no vision that is either "male" or "female," as "vision" in the way that Li meant it, is not gendered. This means that shortsightedness is not inherently female, nor is farsightedness inherently male. Li illustrates this point by describing a hypothetical situation in which there is someone with "a woman's body and a man's vision," someone who is both female and not only values engaging in conversation of the "transcendent," but also understands that attachment to the ever-changing things of the material world is not worthwhile. He makes reference to notable "farsighted" women of the past, such as Yi Jiang (King Wu's ninth minister) and Wen Mu (also known as Tai Si, King Wen's consort and a "sage" whose "virtuous behavior" set such a high standard that it "rectified" the customs of the southern regions).

Li Zhi asserts that it is only a shortsighted man who would anger at the idea of women being farsighted, and that a truly farsighted man would neither engage with nor desire the approval of shortsighted men (for, if he did, it would only make him one such shortsighted, "small-minded" man himself).

== Literary works ==
Li was a notable author of the xiaopin, a form of short essay. His philosophical works included A Book to Burn and A Book to Keep (Hidden).

=== A Book to Burn and A Book to Keep (Hidden) ===
A Book to Burn is composed of Li's responses to questions from friends ("soul friends," he calls them) in which he offers criticism of what he considers to be mistakes of the contemporary scholars of the day. Li wanted to print this book because of the possibility that it would make its way to those who might be interested in his ideas. Though he feared being killed by dissenters for what he'd written, he was nevertheless optimistic that someone might read his work and understand what he meant.

Li also writes of the relationship between married couples in this text, describing "loving-kindness" as being particularly "profound." He discusses how the intimacy that is cultivated within such a relationship extends beyond sex and even friendship by virtue of both parties having struggled and "sacrificed" together. He waxes poetic about his late wife, praising her "feminine" virtues, which, in Confucianism, referred to "womanly virtue, womanly speech, womanly appearance, and womanly work."

A Book to Keep (Hidden) gives accounts of thousands of years of good and bad deeds from antiquity to the current age. By Li's own advice, it cannot be read by those who possess "eyes of flesh" (a Buddhist term indicating the "most mundane form of vision" characteristic of someone unenlightened).

== Bibliography and further reading ==
- Qingliang Chen. Li Zhi (1527–1602) and his Literary Thought. 1999. University of Massachusetts, Amherst, Master's Thesis.
- L. Carrington Goodrich and Chanying Fang, eds., Dictionary of Ming Biography 1368-1644, 2 vols. (New York: Columbia University Press, 1976), II: 807-818
- Phillip Grimberg, Dem Feuer geweiht: Das Lishi Fenshu des Li Zhi (1527–1602). Uebersetzung, Analyse, Kommentar. Marburg: 2014, 442pp.
- Rivi Handler-Spitz, Pauline C. Lee, Haun Saussy, eds. A Book to Burn and A Book to Keep (Hidden): Selected Writings of Li Zhi. New York: Columbia University Press, 2016. ISBN 978-0-231-16612-6
- Ray Huang, 1587: A Year of No Significance (New Haven: Yale University Press, 1981), pp. 189–221.
- Pauline C. Lee Li Zhi (1527–1602): A Confucian Feminist of Late-Ming China. 2002. Stanford University, PhD Dissertation.
- Pauline C. Lee Li Zhi, Confucianism, and the Virtue of Desire Albany NY: SUNY, 2012.
- Mair, Victor H. (ed.) (2001). The Columbia History of Chinese Literature. New York: Columbia University Press. ISBN 0-231-10984-9. (Amazon Kindle edition.)
- Marie Laure de Shazer, Le Club des Confucéens et Lizhi, le Mal Aimé en Chine (French Edition) ISBN 979-8738163135
- Jean François Billeter, Li Zhi, philosophe maudit, Geneva, Droz, (1979), (in French) ISBN 2600040862
