= Three Great Campaigns of the Wanli Emperor =

1592–1600 Chinese military campaigns

The Wanli Emperor, clad in ceremonial armor, rode on horseback, accompanied by his personal guards

The Three Great Campaigns of the Wanli Emperor (Note: simplified Chinese: 万历三大征; traditional Chinese: 萬曆三大征; pinyin: Wànlì sān dàzhēng) were three major military campaigns undertaken by the Ming dynasty of China during the reign of the Wanli Emperor (1572–1620), fought along the empire's northwestern and southwestern frontiers and in Korea. They comprised the suppression of the Ningxia rebellion, the Ming intervention against the Japanese invasions of Korea, and the suppression of the Bozhou rebellion. These campaigns strengthened Ming control over its frontier regions and helped maintain its influence in East Asia.

The Ningxia campaign lasted from March to October 1592. The Korean campaign took place in two phases, from 1592 to 1593 and from 1597 to 1598. The Bozhou campaign lasted from 1599 to 1600.

== Campaigns ==
=== Ningxia campaign ===
In March 1592, a revolt led by Chinese and Mongol garrison soldiers broke out in the northwestern city of Ningxia, one of the Ming dynasty's nine frontier garrisons along its northern border with Mongol territories. The insurgents had a force of 20,000 to 30,000 soldiers, while the city itself was home to 300,000 inhabitants. The Ming government mobilized an army of 40,000 soldiers, armed with hundreds of cannons, to suppress the rebellion. Despite ongoing clashes, neither side was able to gain the upper hand during the months-long siege. The rebels attempted to gain support from the Mongol khans, but the Ming generals remained steadfast and rejected any attempts at aid from the Mongols. The stalemate was broken by the construction of a dam around the city. Once the dam was filled with water, the city was flooded and the water breached the city's defenses. The defenders' morale was further weakened by a lack of food. On 20 October 1592, the city was captured and the rebel leaders were either killed or captured and executed.

=== Korean campaign ===
The Korean campaign, 1592–1598

In the early 1590s, Japanese warlord Toyotomi Hideyoshi successfully unified Japan under his rule, but his ambitions extended beyond Japan, leading him to set his sights on conquering Korea and Ming China. In May 1592, Japanese troops landed in Korea. Due to the Korean army's lack of preparation, they were unable to put up much resistance and the Japanese quickly advanced, taking control of Seoul in just twenty days before continuing further north. This occupation sparked a wave of popular resistance that eventually evolved into a guerrilla war. The Korean navy, led by Admiral Yi Sun-sin, played a crucial role in organizing the resistance with their victories in the summer and autumn of 1592. The Korean land army also rallied, and in early 1593, the Chinese government sent a large corps, led by Li Rusong, to aid the Koreans. By May 1593, the Sino-Korean troops had pushed the Japanese to the vicinity of Busan in southeastern Korea. In 1593, the Japanese agreed to negotiate an armistice in order to buy time for a new offensive. Their next invasion in 1597 was unsuccessful, and they were once again pushed to the southeast. After Hideyoshi's death in September 1598, the Japanese withdrew from Korea by the end of the year.

=== Bozhou campaign ===
Tensions between the Ming authorities and Yang Yinglong, a Miao chieftain whose territory lay near the borders of Huguang, Guizhou, and Sichuan in southwestern China, began in 1587 and escalated into open conflict in 1590. This continued with intermittent breaks until 1600. In 1599, after the conclusion of the war in Korea, the Ming government appointed Li Hualong, an official with military experience, to suppress the rebellion. Li Hualong was joined by experienced generals from Korea, and after months of careful preparation, he led an army of approximately 240,000 soldiers divided into eight corps. The final offensive was launched in March 1600. The rebel forces, estimated to be around 150,000 soldiers, put up a fierce fight, but were ultimately defeated in mid-July when the Ming army captured Yang Yinglong's stronghold at Hailongtun. Yang Yinglong took his own life, and his territory was incorporated into the standard Chinese administrative system.

=== Other domestic disturbances and border crises ===
During the Wanli Emperor's reign, multiple domestic uprisings and revolts took place. The most significant were those organized by the White Lotus sect in Shandong in 1587 and 1616. Along the northern frontier, Ming-Mongol relations became generally more stable after 1571, following the peace agreement with Altan Khan and the reopening of Sino-Mongol trade, though military conflicts continued intermittently. Ming forces continued to carry out raids into Mongolia and Manchuria, destroying settlements, killing resisting leaders, and seizing livestock. In 1591, the Ming general Li Chengliang attacked and destroyed a Mongol camp, killing 280 Mongols and dispersing more than a thousand others. Although Mongol groups north and northwest of Beijing became relatively peaceful after 1571, Mongols in Ordos continued raiding Gansu, leading to repeated Ming counterattacks supported by Tibetan and Uyghur auxiliary troops. Mongol forces in the northeast also launched major assaults on the Ming region of Liaodong, sometimes involving 30,000–50,000 horsemen, and in 1598 the regional commander Li Rusong was killed in battle against them. Occasional fighting also occurred on the southwestern border, where the Burmese encroached on the frontier. In 1582–1583 and again in 1584, the Ming army, led by Liu Ting, repelled them and penetrated deep into Burma. The Burmese attacked Yunnan again in the last decade of the 16th century. In 1594, the governor of Yunnan organized a counterattack with Siam, and in 1600, combined Ming-Siamese forces burned the Burmese capital of Pegu. In 1607, Đại Việt (present-day northern Vietnam) also conducted a raid into the borderlands of Yunnan and Guangxi.

== In perspective ==
The Three Great Campaigns, together with repeated military interventions in border disputes involving Burma, the suppression of banditry and rebellions among indigenous groups, and military raids against the Jurchens and Mongols, helped maintain the Ming dynasty's political, military, and economic pre-eminence in East Asia.

The term "Three Great Campaigns" was first used by late Ming scholars Feng Menglong (1574–1646) and Gu Yingtai (谷應泰; 1620–1690). Historian Mao Ruizheng (茅瑞徵; 1577–1637) wrote the Wanli sandazheng kao (萬曆三大征考; 'Thoughts on the Three Military Campaigns of the Wanli Era'), while Qu Jiusi (瞿九思; 1546–1617) compiled the Wanli Wugong lu (萬曆武功錄; 'Record of Military Achievements of the Wanli Reign'), a work in 14 volumes.

Although all three campaigns ended in Ming victories, they placed a considerable strain on the Ming government's finances. According to the History of Ming, the Ningxia campaign cost the imperial treasury more than 2 million taels of silver, the Korean campaign over 7 million taels, and the Bozhou campaign a further 2–3 million taels. The biography of Wang Dewan (王德完) in volume 235 of the same work gives different figures: over 1.8 million taels for Ningxia, 7.8 million for Korea, and 2 million for Bozhou.
