= Luo Rufang =

Luo Rufang (Chinese: 罗汝芳, 1515–1588), also Weide (courtesy name, zì) or Jinxi (art pseudonym, hào), was a Chinese philosopher of the Ming Dynasty.

== Biography ==
He was a Neo-Confucian that was considered heir to the Yang Ming school in Taizhou. He was also an official and educator.

Luo was the student of Yan Jun (严钧), who studied from Wang Yangming's first disciple, Wang Ji. His student, Yang Qiyuan (杨起元), called him "De wu chang shi, shan wu chang zhu".

== Thought ==
Luo created a new style of Xin Xue, which contained three aspects:

- Seeking Humanity
- Nature heart around the main contents of "Reverting Destiny"
- Six sayings by the Emperor

He is often regarded as the forerunner of Huang Zongxi, Gu Yanwu, and Wang Fuzhi.
