= Wang Gen =

Chinese Neo-Confucian philosopher (1483–1541)

given name
- Chinese: 王艮 （初名“银”，王守仁为其改名“艮”）
Transcriptions
Standard Mandarin
- Hanyu Pinyin: Wáng Yín

courtesy name
- Chinese: 汝止
Transcriptions
Standard Mandarin
- Hanyu Pinyin: Rǔ Zhǐ

posthumous name
- Chinese: 心斎
Transcriptions
Standard Mandarin
- Hanyu Pinyin: Xīn Zhāi

Wang Gen (Wang Ken Chinese: 王艮; pinyin: Wáng Gěn), (20 July 1483 – 2 January 1541) was a Ming dynasty Neo-Confucian philosopher who popularized the teachings of Wang Yangming. Wang Gen was the founder of the Taizhou School (simplified Chinese: 泰州学派; traditional Chinese: 泰州學派; pinyin: Tàizhōu xuépài).
