= Taijitu =

Chinese philosophical symbol representing two opposites combined as one

- Diagram of the Utmost Extremes

Chinese name
- Traditional Chinese: 太極圖
- Simplified Chinese: 太极图
Transcriptions
Standard Mandarin
- Hanyu Pinyin: tàijítú
- Bopomofo: ㄊㄞˋ ㄐㄧˊ ㄊㄨˊ
- Wade–Giles: tʻai^{4}-chi^{2}-tʻu^{2}
- Tongyong Pinyin: tài-jí-tú
- IPA: [tʰâɪ.tɕǐ.tʰǔ]
Yue: Cantonese
- Yale Romanization: taai gihk tòuh
- Jyutping: taai3 gik6 tou4
- IPA: [tʰaj˧ kɪk̚˨ tʰɔw˩]
Southern Min
- Tâi-lô: thàiki̍ktôo

Vietnamese name
- Vietnamese alphabet: Thái cực đồ
- Chữ Hán: 太極圖

Korean name
- Hangul: 태극도
- Hanja: 太極圖
Transcriptions
- Revised Romanization: taegeugdo

Japanese name
- Shinjitai: 太極図
Transcriptions
- Romanization: taikyokuzu

In Chinese philosophy, a taijitu (Chinese: 太極圖; pinyin: tàijítú; Wade–Giles: tʻai⁴chi²tʻu²) is a symbol or diagram (圖; tú) representing taiji (太極; tàijí; 'utmost extreme') in both its monist (wuji) and its dualist (yin and yang) forms. A taijitu in application provides a deductive and inductive theoretical model. Such a diagram was first introduced by Neo-Confucian philosopher Zhou Dunyi of the Song Dynasty in his Taijitu shuo (太極圖說).

The Fourth Daozang, a Taoist canon compiled in the 1440s CE during the Ming dynasty, has at least half a dozen variants of the taijitu. The two most similar are the Taiji Xiantiandao and wujitu (無極圖; wújítú) diagrams, both of which have been extensively studied since the Qing period for their possible connection with Zhou Dunyi's taijitu.

Ming-period author Lai Zhide (1525–1604) simplified the taijitu to a design of two interlocking spirals with two black-and-white dots superimposed on them, which became associated with the Yellow River Map. This version was represented in Western literature and popular culture in the late-19th century as the "Great Monad", and this depiction became known in English as the "yin-yang symbol" from the 1960s. The contemporary Chinese term for the modern symbol is referred to as "the two-part Taiji diagram" (太極兩儀圖).

Ornamental patterns with visual similarity to the "yin-yang symbol" are found in archaeological artefacts of European prehistory; such designs are sometimes descriptively dubbed "yin-yang symbols" in archaeological literature by modern scholars.

== Structure ==
The taijitu consists of five parts. Strictly speaking, the "yin and yang symbol", itself popularly called taijitu, represents the second of these five parts of the diagram.

- At the top, an empty circle depicts the absolute (wuji). According to Zhou, wuji is also a synonym for taiji.
- A second circle represents the Taiji as harboring Dualism, yin and yang, represented by filling the circle in a black-and-white pattern. In some diagrams, there is a smaller empty circle at the center of this, representing Emptiness as the foundation of duality.
- Below this second circle is a five-part diagram representing the Five Agents (Wuxing), representing a further stage in the differentiation of Unity into Multiplicity. The Five Agents are connected by lines indicating their proper sequence, Wood (木) → Fire (火) → Earth (土) → Metal (金) → Water (水).
- The circle below the Five Agents represents the conjunction of Heaven and Earth, which in turn gives rise to the "ten thousand things". This stage is also represented by the bagua.
- The final circle represents the state of multiplicity, glossed "The ten thousand things are born by transformation" (萬物化生; simplified 万物化生)

== History ==
The term taijitu in modern Chinese is commonly used to mean the simple "divided circle" form, but it may refer to any of several schematic diagrams that contain at least one circle with an inner pattern of symmetry representing yin and yang.

=== Song and Yuan eras ===
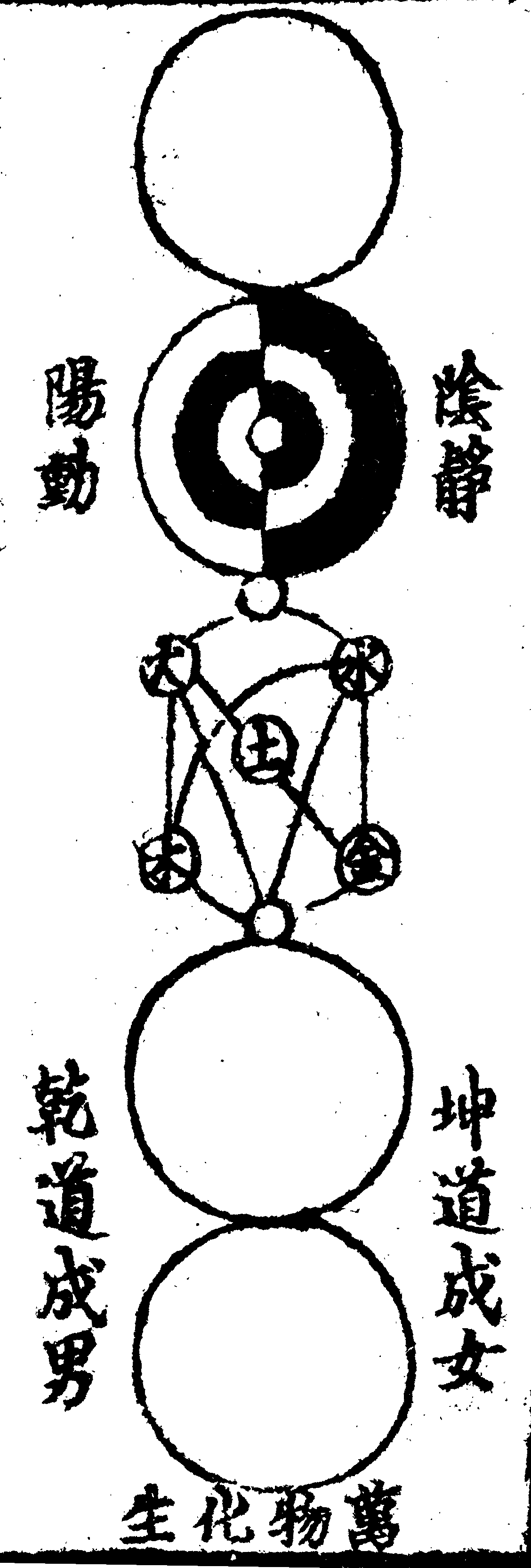
Yuan dynasty Taijitu diagram from the Shilin Guangji by Chen Yuanjing

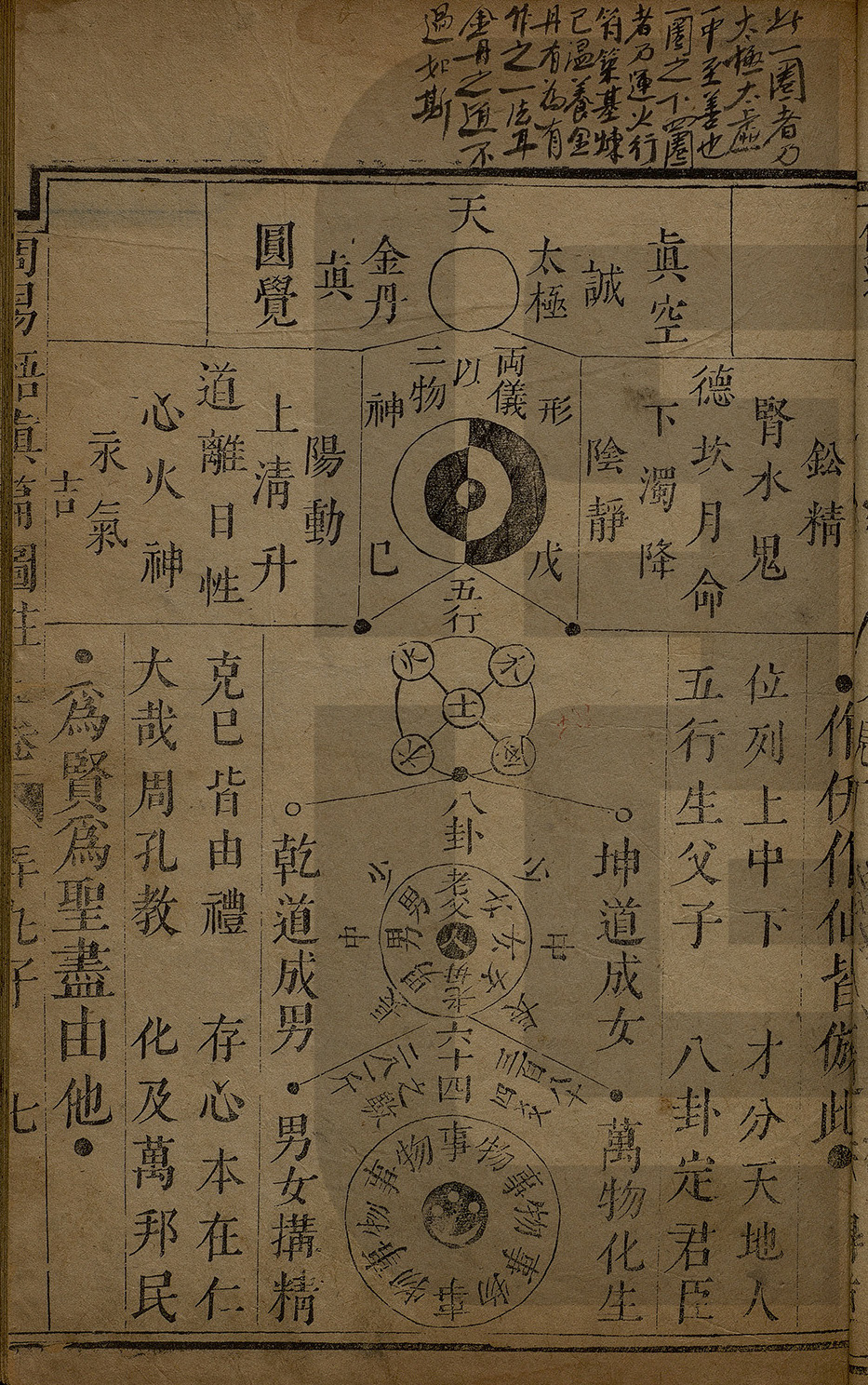
Diagram of Continuation-Inversion (順逆之圖), based on the Taijitu, first published in 1611

While the concept of yin and yang dates to Chinese antiquity, the interest in "diagrams" (圖 tú) is an intellectual fashion of Neo-Confucianism during the Song period (11th century), and it declined again in the Ming period, by the 16th century. During the Mongol Empire and Yuan dynasty, Taoist traditions and diagrams were compiled and published in the encyclopedia Shilin Guangji by Chen Yuanjing.

The original description of a taijitu is due to Song era philosopher Zhou Dunyi (1017–1073), author of the Taijitu shuo (太極圖說; "Explanation of the Diagram of the Supreme Ultimate"), which became the cornerstone of Neo-Confucianist cosmology. His brief text synthesized aspects of Chinese Buddhism and Taoism with metaphysical discussions in the Yijing.

Zhou's key terms Wuji and Taiji appear in the opening line 無極而太極, which Adler notes could also be translated "The Supreme Polarity that is Non-Polar".

Non-polar (wuji) and yet Supreme Polarity (taiji)! The Supreme Polarity in activity generates yang; yet at the limit of activity it is still. In stillness it generates yin; yet at the limit of stillness it is also active. Activity and stillness alternate; each is the basis of the other. In distinguishing yin and yang, the Two Modes are thereby established. The alternation and combination of yang and yin generate water, fire, wood, metal, and earth. With these five [phases of] qi harmoniously arranged, the Four Seasons proceed through them. The Five Phases are simply yin and yang; yin and yang are simply the Supreme Polarity; the Supreme Polarity is fundamentally Non-polar. [Yet] in the generation of the Five Phases, each one has its nature.

Instead of usual Taiji translations "Supreme Ultimate" or "Supreme Pole", Adler uses "Supreme Polarity" (see Robinet 1990) because Zhu Xi describes it as the alternating principle of yin and yang, and:

insists that taiji is not a thing (hence "Supreme Pole" will not do). Thus, for both Zhou and Zhu, taiji is the yin-yang principle of bipolarity, which is the most fundamental ordering principle, the cosmic "first principle." Wuji as "non-polar" follows from this.

Since the 12th century, there has been a vigorous discussion in Chinese philosophy regarding the ultimate origin of Zhou Dunyi's diagram. Zhu Xi (12th century) insists that Zhou Dunyi had composed the diagram himself, against the prevailing view that he had received it from Daoist sources. Zhu Xi could not accept a Daoist origin of the design, because it would have undermined the claim of uniqueness attached to the Neo-Confucian concept of dao.

=== Ming and Qing eras ===
While Zhou Dunyi (1017–1073) popularized the circular diagram, the introduction of "swirling" patterns first appears in the Ming period and representative of transformation.

Zhao Huiqian (趙撝謙, 1351–1395) was the first to introduce the "swirling" variant of the taijitu in his Liushu benyi (六書本義, 1370s). The diagram is combined with the eight trigrams (bagua) and called the "River Chart spontaneously generated by Heaven and Earth". By the end of the Ming period, this diagram had become a widespread representation of Chinese cosmology.

The dots were introduced in the later Ming period (replacing the droplet-shapes used earlier, in the 16th century) and are encountered more frequently in the Qing period. The dots represent the seed of yin within yang and the seed of yang within yin; the idea that neither can exist without the other and are never absolute.

Lai Zhide's design is similar to the gakyil (dga' 'khyil or "wheel of joy") symbols of Tibetan Buddhism; but while the Tibetan designs have three or four swirls (representing the Three Jewels or the Four Noble Truths, i.e. as a triskele and a tetraskelion design), Lai Zhide's taijitu has two swirls, terminating in a central circle.

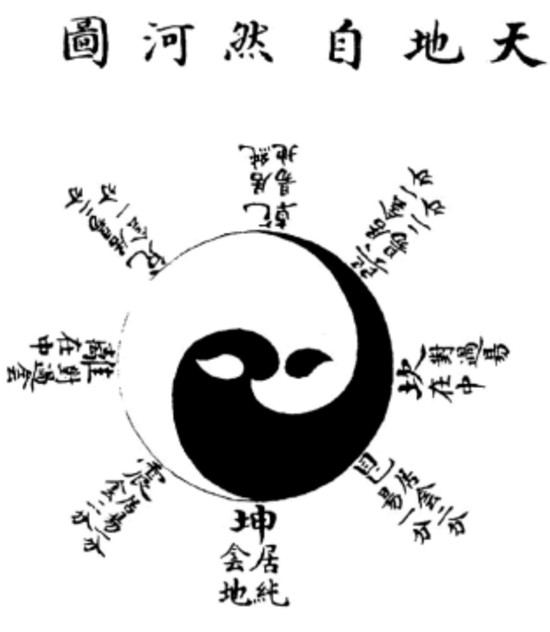
Diagram from Zhao Huiqian's Liushu benyi (1370s) as represented in the Siku Quanshu edition (1751)

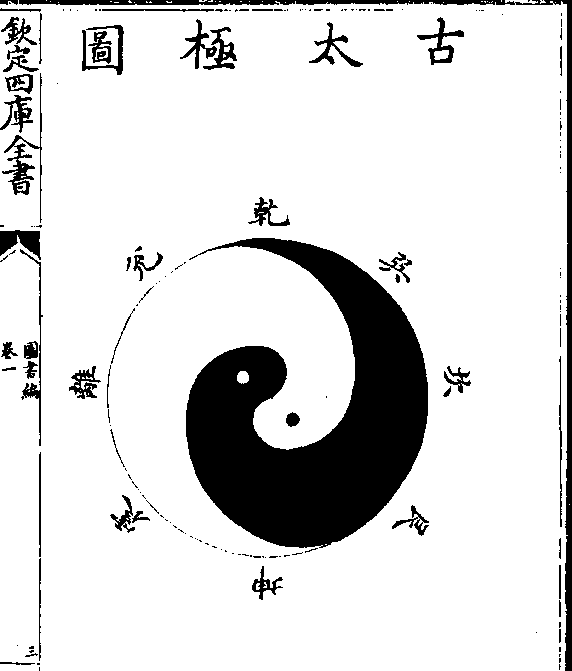
Diagram from Zhang Huang's Tushu Bian as represented in the Siku Quanshu edition (1613)

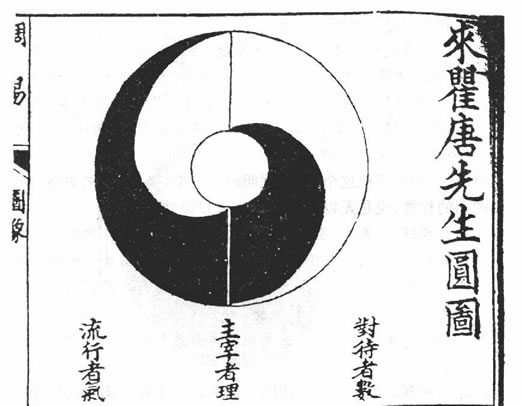
Simplified form of Lai Zhide's "Taiji River Diagram" (1599)

== Modern yin-yang symbol ==
The Ming-era design of the taijitu of two interlocking spirals was a common yin-yang symbol in the first half of the 20th century. The flag of South Korea, originally introduced as the flag of Joseon era Korea in 1882, shows this symbol in red and blue. This was a modernisation of the older (early 19th century) form of the Bat Quai Do used as the Joseon royal standard.

The symbol is referred to as taijitu, simply taiji (or the Supreme Ultimate in English), hetu or "river diagram", "the yin-yang circle", or wuji, as wuji was viewed synonymously with the artistic and philosophical concept of taiji by some Taoists, including Zhou. Zhou viewed the dualistic and paradoxical relationship between the concepts of taiji and wuji, which were and are often thought to be opposite concepts, as a cosmic riddle important for the "beginning...and ending" of a life.

The names of the taijitu are highly subjective and some interpretations of the texts they appear in would only call the principle of taiji those names rather than the symbol.

Since the 1960s, the He tu symbol, which combines the two interlocking spirals with two dots, has more commonly been used as a yin-yang symbol.
compare with

In the standard form of the contemporary symbol, one draws on the diameter of a circle two non-overlapping circles each of which has a diameter equal to the radius of the outer circle. One keeps the line that forms an "S", and one erases or obscures the other line. In 2008 the design was also described by Isabelle Robinet as a "pair of fishes nestling head to tail against each other".

The Soyombo symbol of Mongolia may be prior to 1686. It combines several abstract shapes, including a Taiji symbol illustrating the mutual complement of man and woman. In socialist times, it was alternatively interpreted as two fish symbolizing vigilance, because fish never close their eyes.

The modern symbol has also been widely used in martial arts, particularly tai chi, and Jeet Kune Do, since the 1970s. In this context, it is generally used to represent the interplay between hard and soft techniques.

The dots in the modern "yin-yang symbol" have been given the additional interpretation of "intense interaction" between the complementary principles, i.e. a flux or flow to achieve harmony and balance.

The flag of Korea as of 1882 (readopted as the flag of South Korea since 1948)

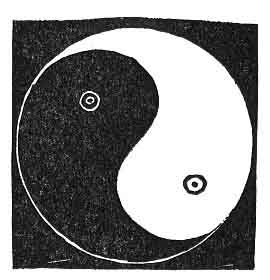
"The Great Monad" from Edna Kenton's Book of Earths (1928), after the design shown by Hampden Coit DuBose (1887)

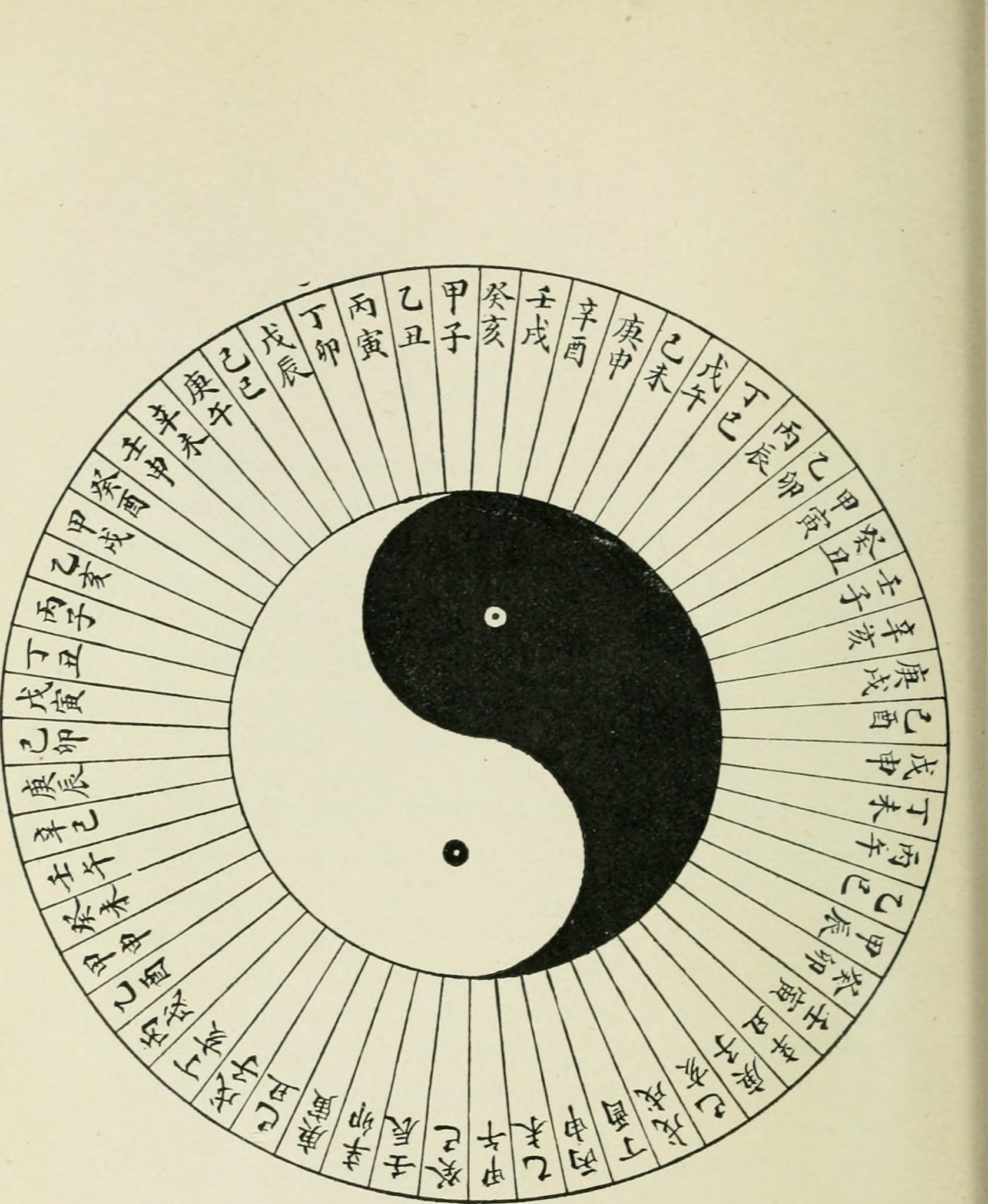
The "cycle of Cathay" as depicted by William Alexander Parsons Martin in 1897

Coat of arms adopted by Niels Bohr in 1947, showing a taijitu in red and black, with the motto contraria sunt complementa ("opposites are complementary")

"Yin-Yang symbol or Tao symbol" (without the dots) as reported in 1964

Bagua: Modern Taijitu with I Ching trigrams

Several flags of Mongolia have incorporated a taiji symbol since 1911

Early taijitu and red star emblem of the Mongolian Revolutionary Youth League, used from 1925 to 1942

The flag of Tibet has included a taijitu since 1916

The first emblem of the Korean People's Army in 1948

Roundel of the Republic of Singapore Air Force included a taijitu between 1973 and 1990.

Flag of the National Defense University of Taiwan since 2000

Emblem of Isesaki, Japan since 1911

Emblem of Hamamatsu, Japan since 2005

Emblem of the North American technocracy movement

== Similar symbols ==
Shield pattern of the Western Roman infantry unit Armigeri Defensores Seniores (c. AD 430)

Similarities can be seen in Neolithic–Eneolithic era Cucuteni–Trypillia culture on the territory of current Ukraine and Romania. Patterns containing ornament looking like Taijitu from archeological artifacts of that culture were displayed in the Ukraine pavilion at the Expo 2010 in Shanghai, China.

The interlocking design is found in artifacts of the European Iron Age. Similar interlocking designs are found in the Americas: Xicalcoliuhqui.

While this design appears to become a standard ornamental motif in Iron-Age Celtic culture by the 3rd century BC, found on a wide variety of artifacts, it is not clear what symbolic value was attached to it. Unlike the Chinese symbol, the Celtic yin-yang lack the element of mutual penetration, and the two halves are not always portrayed in different colors. Comparable designs are also found in Etruscan art. The Irish Air Corps used a similar design in green and orange (without the dots) for its roundel between 1939 and 1954.

== In computing ==
Unicode features the he tu symbol in the Miscellaneous Symbols block, at code point U+262F ☯ YIN YANG. The related "double body symbol" is included at U+0FCA ࿊ TIBETAN SYMBOL NOR BU NYIS -KHYIL, in the Tibetan block. The Soyombo symbol, which includes a taijitu, is available in Unicode as the sequence U+11A9E 𑪞 + U+11A9F 𑪟 + U+11AA0 𑪠.

== See also ==
- Gankyil
- Koru
- Lauburu
- Taegeuk
- Three hares
- Tomoe
- Triskelion
