= Yin-style baguazhang =

Style of Chinese martial art

Yin Style Baguazhang
- Also known as: 東城掌 Dong-cheng Zhang (Eastern City Palm), 牛舌掌 Niu-she Zhang (Ox Tongue Palm)
- Hardness: Internal (neijia)
- Country of origin: China
- Creator: Yin Fu 尹福
- Famous practitioners: Ma Gui, Li Yongqing, Men Baozhen, Li Bao Sen, Meng Lian Fu, Yin Yuzhang, Cao Zhongsheng, Gong Baotian (founder of Gong Baotian Baguazhang Style)
- Parenthood: Baguazhang
- Descendant arts: Gong Baotian Baguazhang Style
- Olympic sport: No

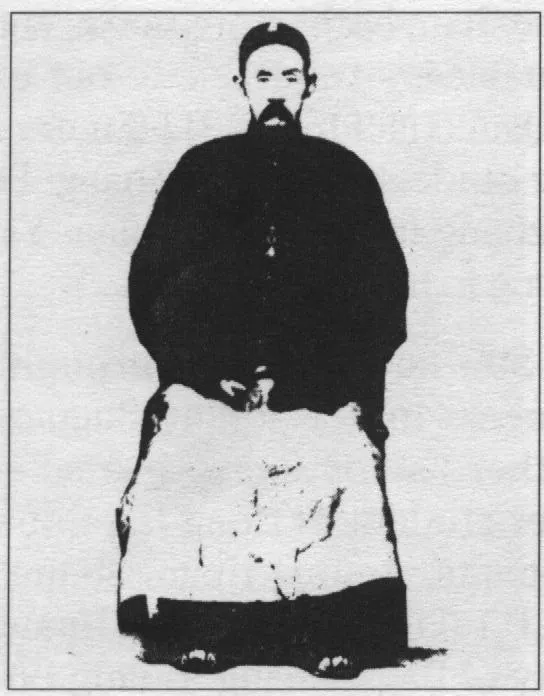
Yin Fu, first student of Dong Hai Chuan and progenitor of Yin Style BaguaZhang

Yin Style Baguazhang is a style of Baguazhang.

== History ==
Yin Fu (尹福) after separating from Dong Haichuan (董海川) went on to teach multiple students. Due to his closed-door methods of teaching, he did not have as many students as teachers directly associated with Cheng Tinghua (程廷華) and others. Of these students, Men Baozhen (門寶珍) and Li Bao Sen (李寶森) were among two students who handed down their arts in Beijing after Yin's death. Men Baozhen eventually taught Xie Pei Qi and Li Bao Sen taught Meng Lian Fu and Zhang Qing Lian. In an interview with Xie Peiqi, dated to 1999, Xie personally claimed that his teacher, Men Baozhen, was considered to be the third best pupil of Yin Fu, after "Wan Tong" Li (i.e. Li Yongqing) and Ma Gui (Yin's oldest disciple). Dr. Xie died in 2003 and his top student, He Jinbao, is now teaching the system. The Li Bao Sen lineage of Yin style was eventually handed down to Xu Shi Xi who gained a notoriety for being quite skilled at both his fighting abilities and teaching Baguazhang. Other famous students of Yin Fu included Yin Yuzhang (his fourth son), Cao Zhongsheng (who also learned from Ma Gui), and Gong Baotian. Ma Gui, Yin Fu's first disciple, stated that he changed nothing in the bagua he learned from Yin Fu. Included among Ma Gui's students were Wang Peisheng, who is more famous for his Wu style taijiquan, and Liu Wanchuan.

== Overview ==
Due to the nature in which Baguazhang was taught by Dong Hai Chuan to his students, in the first few generations no two students' Baguazhang looked exactly the same. While Yin Fu was known by some for particular skills including Piercing/Penetrating palm techniques and Iron Bracelet Qinna, the methods he taught were quite diverse and it can be seen in the diversity of the various Yin Style lineages and their techniques today. Yin style Baguazhang today has many branches with some focusing on particular techniques that one of the teacher's in their lineage may have been particularly fond of and so placed an emphasis on those techniques while other systems have a more broad approach not solely placing importance on only one or a few techniques but rather training a myriad of techniques that can be combined in hundreds if not thousands of ways in combat.

Some schools strongly emphasize correlations to the 易經 I Ching and 八卦 Bagua trigrams while others simply use them for a framework of structuring the system as they teach it and yet some others do not talk much about the correlations to the trigrams at all. Most information that comes down from students of Dong Hai Chuan suggest that he did not call the art '八卦掌' Baguazhang to begin with but rather '轉掌' Zhuan Zhang or rotating palms referring to the circling nature of practice. It also seems he taught three types of palm changes and these changes varied per individual to fit them the best. Techniques were extrapolated or added around the core techniques from these palm changes. It was the second generation of teachers, those who learned from Yin Fu, Cheng Ting Hua, etc., who openly described the system in teaching and writings as Baguazhang and associated it more strongly with the Eight Trigrams. Whether or not this was originally taught by Dong Hai Chuan himself or developed later is hard to tell.

=== Yin Style Baguazhang under the Xie PeiQi lineage ===
Yin Style as passed down by Xie Peiqi is notable for having eight distinct animal styles within the body of the art. In other words, Xie's Yin Style is a complete system, which is made up of other complete systems. These include the eight animal systems as well as several 'unorthodox' systems, such as the Penetrating Palm and Backhand systems. Each of the eight animal styles is related to one of the Eight Trigrams of the I Ching. The following table describes this relationship:

Trigram			Animal	Chinese	Title
	Chinese	Pinyin	Animal	Chinese	Title
☰	乾	Qián	Lion	獅	Interlocking
☱	兌	Dui	Monkey	猴	Enfolding
☲	離	Lí	Rooster	鷂	Lying step
☳	震	Zhèn	Dragon	龍	Lifting and holding
☴	巽	Xùn	Phoenix	鳳	Windmill
☵	坎	Kǎn	Snake	蛇	Moving with the force
☶	艮	Gèn	Bear	熊	Turning the back
☷	坤	Kūn	Qilin/Unicorn	麟	Reversing the body

Each animal is a complete system in its own right, possessing its own personality, skills, applications, and functions. Each of the eight animal systems contains eight striking methods, and each striking method has seven strikes. Three of those seven are considered the 'primary' strikes and are emphasized more than the others in single practice. Therefore, the animal systems of Xie's Yin Style Bagua have a total of 448 unique strikes. However, Xie's Yin Style Bagua also contains other unorthodox systems outside of the eight animals, such as Penetrating Palm and the Backhand systems. Hence, there are more than 448 strikes, though 448 are contained within the animals. (Note that the animal relationships with the bagua diagram are not unique to Xie's art; these relationships are also often used for other styles of bagua, including Cheng substyles, such as that of Sun Lutang.)

Other substyles of Yin include different forms and methods. For example, Cao Zhongsheng's system's technical base is the 64 palms (also taught by Wang Peisheng); other substyles focus on only 8 main palms (such as that of Liu Zhenlin, Li Baosen, or other Men Baozhen lineages). Gong Baotian's version has many forms and a strong emphasis on Yin Fu's Luohan forms. Each substyle also includes many supplementary forms (such as luohanquan) and training methods (such as hand hardening methods).

=== Four Basic Practices ===
There are four basic practice methods in Xie Peiqi's Yin Style Baguazhang: standing, turning, striking, and changing. These practices are the basic pillars of the style, and are all considered equally important.

==== Standing ====
The standing practices involve nine static strengthening postures specific to a given animal. Each posture requires precise body alignment and distinct isometric pressures necessitating full body exertion to maintain properly. These postures are undertaken to develop and check the structure of every part of the body.

==== Turning ====
Turning (or turning the circle), is the practice many people associate with Baguazhang. "Yin style Bagua is the art of striking while you are moving. You ceaselessly move and strike, and are always trying to get to the outside [of your opponent] by turning. No matter what, position yourself to avoid the heavy blows and let the light ones fall. It is within turning that these movements and techniques are honed to perfection or to a higher level. All movements and techniques are linked smoothly together."

==== Striking ====
Striking is the most fundamental way of developing power in Yin Style Baguazhang. It is introduced through the stationary drilling method, unaccompanied by footwork. It is intended to establish the harmony between hand and waist that is necessary for generating power.

The moving strike practices consist of:

- One-step drilling method, of which there is the zig-zag stepping or dominating the side, straight stepping, or dominating the center, and closing or turning the back method.
- Two-step, or square drilling, which consists of advance-back-step, advance-advance, or back-step-advance, and back-step back-step.
- Three-step, or horizontal drilling method, which combines the stationary strike, advance step, and back-step.

==== Changing ====
Changing is most obvious when changing hands to face opposite directions. Changing also includes the changing or redirecting of force, or alterations in stepping.

=== Animal styles in Xie Peiqi's Yin Style ===
==== Commonalities between the animal styles ====
Each animal style in Yin Style Baguazhang is its own complete system; however, each system contains practices and movements from all of the other animal systems. Example: when practicing forms in Yin Style Bagua, a practitioner may practice, for example, the Lion System Windmill Sweeping Strike Form. The strikes come from the lion system, but the Windmill movements come from the Phoenix system.

Thus, each animal has a specific movement technique in addition to its 8 striking methods. Each animal also has its own kicking technique, which is not included in its striking methods.

==== Qian Trigram Lion System ====
The lion is pure Yang energy, or hardness, and is one of two animals represented by a pure trigram; the other is the Unicorn. The lion trigram is characterized by powerful and ferocious full-body force generated from the waist. The lion's eight striking methods are: sweeping, cutting, chopping, hooking, shocking, blocking, seizing and grasping.

The lion's characteristic movement technique is Linking the Forms.

==== Kan Trigram Snake System ====
The Snake's striking methods are: shoulder, elbow, knee, hip, shooting, binding, entrapping, and grasping. The style is characterized by a smooth and flowing motion of the force-palm, with many of the strikes targeted at vital organs.

The snake's characteristic movement technique is Moving with the Force.

==== Gen Trigram Bear System ====
The bear system is distinguished by a strategy of taking advantage from a losing position. The Bear's striking methods are: rushing, penetrating, withdrawing, carrying, leaning, shocking, soft and following. The Bear's power is generated from the back, and is short and blunt.

The bear's characteristic movement technique is Turning the Back.

==== Zhèn Trigram Dragon System ====
Known as the lifting and holding palm. Its striking methods are: pushing, lifting, carrying, leading, moving, capturing, chopping and entering. The Dragon's power is emitted through a forward motion of back and waist. The Dragon style, although practiced differently in Yin Style, is the animal practiced by Cheng Style Baguazhang.

The dragon's characteristic movement technique is Lifting and Upholding.

==== Xun Trigram Phoenix System ====
In the phoenix system, force is emitted from the shoulders, and characterized by whipping action. The striking methods are: dodging, extending, chopping, shocking, transforming, removing, curling in, and cutting.

The phoenix's characteristic movement technique is Windmill.

==== Li Trigram Rooster System ====
The rooster focuses on long, deep footwork with one's center of gravity close to the ground. Power comes from the elbows. The Rooster's striking methods are: dodging, extending, lifting, shifting, entering, whipping, rushing and stabbing.

The rooster's characteristic movement technique is Reclining Step (also known as Lying Step).

==== Kun Trigram Qilin/Unicorn System ====
The Unicorn is the opposite of the Lion, being pure Yin. The Unicorn's striking methods are: sticking, kneading, soft, following, hip, striking, chopping and cutting. It issues force by employing all joints to produce a flexible, snapping power.

The unicorn's characteristic movement technique is Reversing the Body.

==== Dui Trigram Monkey System ====
Concentrates on leg techniques, referred to as the interlocking leg. Its striking methods are: bending, thrusting, straightening, hip, chopping, swinging, stopping, and ending.

The monkey's characteristic movement technique is Compacting the Body.

=== Yin Style Bagua Zhang under the Li Bao Sen lineage ===
The Yin Style passed down through Li Bao Sen (李寶森) differ's in many ways from the Men Bao Zhen lineage speaking to the diversity of training methods taught and developed under Yin Fu and by his students. While not much is known about Li Bao Sen's personal life he trained a number of students who went on to win large national fighting tournaments during the Republic era. Li Bao Sen's most notable student's include Meng Lian Fu (孟連富) and Zhang Qing Lian (張慶廉).

The Yin style lineage passed through Li Bao Sen organizes the system based on the trigrams and structures many of its palm changes in groups of eight. This is very common among schools of Baguazhang. The later concept of using the animal associations of the different 挂 Gua was an invention of later generations, taking the 2nd/3rd generation's use of the Bagua as a symbol to organize the various lineage systems. Where early generations would to associate groups of techniques with various Gua, following generations began to employ various animal associations with the Gua or trigrams to try and represent attributes of those techniques - hence having lion techniques, monkey techniques etc. This should not be confused with the classical names of individual palm changes or techniques that often used animal names to describe the techniques such as 青龍探抓 Green Dragon extends its claws or 獅子滾球 Lion Rolls the Ball. These are names to describe individual movements through literary devices to help a person understand and remember the techniques better. The later development of animal categories was much later 20th century development.

=== Brief History of Li Bao Sen's students ===
Meng Lian Fu studied both Yin Style Baguazhang and his family's 孟氏太極拳 Meng family taijiquan system and went on with his younger martial brother Zhang Qing Lian to represent the Beijing Martial school (at the time called BeiPing Martial School) and win the 1923 Nan Jing National Guo Shu tournament which included them fighting in empty hands and weapons fighting categories where Meng Lian Fu won in empty hands using the short staff and Zhang won empty hands fighting. Zhang Qing Lian went on to compete in competitions in 1924 in Tian Jin and 1925 in Shang Hai.

Meng Lian Fu went on to gain notoriety for his win in NanJing and taught Meng Family Taiji and Yin Style Baguazhang passing his teachings on until his death on February 6, 1963.

Zhang Qing Lian continued to live in Beijing maintaining a private life working as one of Beijing's first western style pastry chefs in a hospital in Chong Wen Men. According to his daughter he had a lifelong habit of rising at 4:30 every morning to train Baguazhang until about 8 am, where then he would get ready and go to work. He wrote in small autobiography that when training BaguaZhang at the 北平第三國術館 BeiPing #3 Martial School that he and his classmates would often rise early and train in the morning before work and then after work or school return to the academy again for evening training. He privately taught a number of students but ultimately passed down his lineage of Yin Style Baguazhang to Xu Shi Xi (徐世熙). Zhang died in November 1988. Shortly before passing away Zhang hand wrote a large manual on Yin Style BaguaZhang. Xu Shi Xi taught openly in Beijing's in Temple of Heaven Park until January 2020. This lineage's structure of Yin Style varies in a few ways from the Men Bao Zhen/Xie PeiQi lineage.

=== Structure of Li Bao Sen / Zhang Qing Lian lineage Yin Style ===
The system is divided up into Shaolin basics training, BaguaZhang empty hand martial training, Baguazhang weapons training and Qi Gong / Dao Yin. The techniques are taught both as drills solo and partnered to develop leg and foot skills, footwork, body methods and striking methods to become proficient at grasping and seizing, throwing, tripping and striking opponents with both hands and feet. It is said Yin Fu had a base in Shaolin martial arts whether taught to him by or before he met Dong Hai Chuan. This lineage of Yin Style kept its Shaolin Ji Ben Gong (basics training) intact with three forms being the core of the Shaolin techniques. Techniques and drills are trained applying the Shaolin techniques. The Baguazhang empty hand training contains multiple palm change sets including fixed posture training called 八式掌 '8 postures palms' that is both standing and done turning a circle, the 八掌 '8 palms' or 八手老掌 '8 old palms' (sometimes referred to in some systems as the 8 old palms or 8 mother palms) and 八形掌 '8 forms/animals palms' also referred to as 八行掌 '8 moving palms' - referred to this because the foot work continuously moves with less stopping). Strategies or body methods are then applied to the palm changes resulting in the palms changing their outward shape or movement. This results in developing many many step by step techniques and variations that the student can see as a linked together progression of skill building. While there are other training methods to this system, what is described here in brief is the core of the martial training.

Shaolin Basics	Baguazhang palm sets
四平拳 Si Ping Quan	八式掌 '8 postures palms' (this includes 內八 inner 8 and 外八 postures)
羅漢拳Luo Han Quan	八掌 '8 palms' // 八手老掌 '8 old palms'
金剛拳Jing Gang Quan	八形掌 '8 forms/animals palms' // 八行掌 '8 moving palms'

=== Circle Turning training ===
When the first palm set is considered adequately trained, the next palm set is learned of different strategies and so on.The fixed postures training is for training the basic body method and building power in movements. It focuses a lot on breathing to be controlled in conjunction with movement and static body postures held for extended periods of time in both stationary and moving postures. In the 8 palms or 'mother palm' the basic Bagua techniques of the system are trained with wide footwork to build stability and power while walking the circle. In the 8 'moving palms' second set the focus is more complex and dynamic body movement and quicker closer foot movements to develop quicker continuous footwork with tight turns and feet landing close and tight together. Each of these sets have multiple levels of training with the techniques evolving over time as the practitioner's body methods and abilities advance. Palm changes and techniques when first training will often not resemble the what the palm changes always look like or how they are applied at more advanced levels due to the change in strategy as ability and skills change. The palm changes in each of the BaguaZhang sets are considered linked to the trigrams of the Bagua with various hand positions in the fixed postures being ascribed to a certain trigram and the strategies and energies of those trigrams interwoven into the practice of the postures both fixed and moving. These ideas are then further extracted into 64 hands which are a series of strategies applied either through hand techniques, body methods or footwork.

=== 64 Hands ===
The 64 hands are a series of strategies which include striking with the hands, arms, legs feet and body, throws, joint locks, submissions and other techniques that can be done both while turning the circle or in straight lines. While many systems of Baguazhang have straight lines of 64 hands drills, this particular lineage of Yin Style has 16 sets of 4 linked strategies or techniques that are done on a circle and in straight line patterns. Each of the 64 strategies can be linked to a strategy idea of one of the hexagrams but it is not necessarily heavily weighted as each technique can have different strategies attached to it depending on how it is applied. The focus of the training should not be all about theoretical strategies but rather actual application. The 64 hands methods as well as the palm changes are often dissected and pulled apart to drill different combinations together. This is why it would be incorrect to say this lineage of Yin style has more or less techniques than other systems of Baguazhang as the combination and recombination of strategies and variations of palm changes and body methods lead naturally to hundreds if not thousands of permutations of techniques. The concept here is that when you develop the core body methods, palm changes and techniques and then train to develop natural applications that spontaneously change to fit the scenario, the technique variation can be endless. Therefore, there are no set number of techniques but rather core methods, techniques and strategies that through training become a very large system.

Xu Shi Xi taught that all techniques were to be pulled out of the forms and drilled in a myriad of combinations and variations and so taught the 64 hands primarily as a series of drills both with partners and solo in many variations. He rarely trained the 64 in the manner his teacher Zhang Qing Lian documented them in his book as Xu was known to say, much like palm changes, they were merely for memorization like understanding a dictionary which lists the basic techniques and those techniques should be also extracted and reshuffled many times over to become natural in any variation and combination for any situation.

六十四手 64 Hands
沖穿磨雲	勾掃雕劈	拌索披肩	掀閃碰靠
[Penetrating/Rushing/Charging/Dashing]; [Piercing]; [Grinding/Rubbing]; [Cloud/Sweeping/Swinging/Passing (horizontally)]	[Hook (hand in hook posture with fingers together)]; [Sweep]; [Grasping/Seizing with fingers together in fist/hook shape]; [Chop]	[Clearing/Mixing]; [Lock/Twist Tightly]; [Drape/Wrap]; [Shoulder]; (Last two characters mean to use shoulder to lock and throw)	[Raise/Lift]; [Dodge/quickly move out of the way]; [Collide/Crash into]; [Bump/Lean on/Strike with body torso (shoulder, chest, upper back, hip)]
推託帶領	崩掛提按	翻轉摔拋	虛空元實
[Pushing/Shoving]; [Support/Carry palm up]; [Bringing/Carrying/Taking/Driving]; [Guiding/Leading/Dragging]	[Collapse/Snap]; [Strike throw or parry that follows the line of the attack back to the opponent]; [Pick up/Hold up/Lift (with arm down)]; [Press down]	[Overturning/rolling over]; [Rotate/Roll]; [Throw]; [Upperward flinging strike]	[Empty/Clear/Hollow/Void]; [Vacant/Void]; [Source]; [Full/Substantial/Solid]
搬攔截扣	浮揉沉垂	橫豁順挑	蹬踹踢腳
[Moving/Removing/Taking away (limb or obstacle)]; [cut off/block someone's path/bar/obstruct]; [intercept, cutting interception, severe an attack]; [hooked in, tucked in, hooked onto]	[Float]; [Roll/Knead]; [Sink]; [Hang]	[Horizontal]; [Open/Split/Crack open]; [Smooth/Following along with]; [swinging lifting strike]	[Straight front kick with sole]; [angled sole kick]; [front kick with top of the foot]; [foot/kick]
沾粘綿纏	隨掳踏擠	進退端撮	镸短接拿
[Touch/make contact with]; [Stick/Glue/Adhere to]; [Continuously Entangle]; [Wrap, Bind up, Coil around]	[Follow (with the changes of the opponent)]; [Capture/Catch/Carry off]; [Smash/Crush]; [Squeeze against (with body)]	[Advance]; [Retreat] [Horizontal/level]; [Pinch]; (last two characters together mean horizontal chop in a pincering motion)	[Long]; [Short]; [Receiving]; [Seizing and holding]

Because characters contain more than one meaning, often a single character is describing a number of qualities that develop the strategy or technique the character represents. Sometimes two or more characters together represent a technique or concept. Some characters are not found in common Chinese dictionaries but are rather specific to Traditional Chinese Wushu, BaguaZhang or even a particular lineages way of describing their techniques and ideas. The above translations attempt to represent that for Li Bao Sen's lineage of Baguazhang taught through XuShiXi.

=== Nei Gong / Dao Yin / Qi Gong ===
Nei Gong / Dao Yin / Qi Gong methods are also included throughout the training of Yin Style in this lineage. These methods are both for martial development and health maintenance. These methods include laying down, sitting, standing and walking methods. Xu Shi Xi taught 4 basic beginning Zhan Zhuang Postures before introducing students into what he would refer to as '功夫樁 / Gong Fu Zhuang' or Martial skill training postures that were more combat oriented in stance and body posture and would develop one connect between the limbs and the back, building power through holding these postures for extended amounts of time, sometimes with resistance other than gravity while focusing on ones breath and reducing unneeded effort and tension but still maintaining the postural requirements. Some of these postures included particular Neigong or Daoyin breathing techniques that include leading the Qi or breath into different areas of the body to create certain results mentally or physically.

Many breathing techniques are used to focus the mind, open up the chest, ribs, diaphragm and abdomen while circulating Qi in the Dantian and the channels. Absorbing and Emitting Qi from and to the environment for health is an aspect of the health maintenance. One particular method which Xu Shi Xi taught as advanced Dao Yin training for Baguazhang martial development was 丹田運轉 Dantian rotational training where the person trains their dantian to the point is acts as a ball rolling and rotating throughout the body eventually joining these movements of the abdomen with the movements of the whole body to create a strong dynamic power that helps to drive all the movements of the body. Methods of Muscle Tendon Changing are also included which involve many exercises including the fixed postures or 定式 Ding Shi practiced both stationary and turning the circle. These postures also having moving aspects that are linked to breathing patterns to further assist in the movement and open and close the body.

Meditation techniques are also taught and applied to training. First through breath control and focusing the mind and then through applying these techniques to circle walking and when training drills. Eventually practices similar to 坐忘 Zuo Wang or Daoist sitting and forgetting meditation methods are applied where the mind is withdrawn from exterior thoughts and returns to the body and becomes still. This helps the practitioner to let go of all preconceived conditions so as to enter into emptiness. With this the mind can transform both fully focusing and being fully aware of the state of the person and their surroundings.

=== Weapons training ===
Weapons training is also another aspect of this lineage. Weapons training includes the traditional Broadsword, Straight Sword, Staff, Spear and also chainwhip, Bagua Broadsword, 子午雞爪鴛鴦鉞 Zi Wu Ji Zhua Yuan Yang Yue (something similar to but not exactly the same as deerhorn knives), and a series of short knives referred to as 'Night Fighting 8 directions knives' .

=== Xu Shi Xi ===
Xu Shi Xi was born into family of Chinese Medicine Physicians. Though never formally becoming a clinical physician he was educated in Chinese Medicine from an early age. He learned Yin Style Baguazhang privately from Zhang Qing Lian starting in his teenage years. According to Zhang's daughter, Zhang Bao Rong, her father found him to be the most clever and brightest pupil he ever had and so he enjoyed teaching Xu. Xu studied with Zhang for many years later modifying some of what he had learned to make it easier for him to apply. Xu Shi Xi was about 5' 5" much shorter than Zhang who stood closer to 6' according to his daughter therefore some of the overhead chopping and high techniques were much more difficult for Xu to pull off leaving him to develop aspects of techniques that looked to strike from underneath a person's line of sight or further develop body method skills that increased the power and leverage of a person when in close to be able to seize, control and topple their opponent with greater speed and ease. Xu utilizing his Chinese Medicine background also spent time investigating the Nei Gong he was taught, working to understand and develop it more. Xu would often teach Nei Gong, Dao Yin, Qin na and point striking by describing the motions, points and effects via Chinese Medicine and the concepts discussed in the Huang Di Nei Jing (Yellow Emperor's Internal Classic). If students had trouble understanding he would use western medical concepts to try and make them understand what he was teaching.

Xu Shifu took a special interest in 快跤 Fast wrestling techniques and Qinna in Bagua and became very adept at them in an effort to help in defeat opponents who were much taller and bigger than he was. At the time he was studying Baguazhang, Taiji became very popular in Beijing and so he often joined Chen Taiji groups to have people to practice with. Over time, although not claiming a specific lineage of Chen Style, he developed a very strong practice of Chen Style taiji that was based on the power generation and much of the explosive body methods he learned through his Yin Style training. Often referred to by other Taiji players as strange or unorthodox compared to standardized Chen Style, he continued to train this way, infusing his Chen Style Taiji with Yin Style Baguazhang and developing a greater understanding for the mechanics of both. Through his exchanges with Taiji practitioners and other martial artists in Beijing, he became very adept at push hands and closing the distance using applications of Baguazhang's fast wrestling. Over time he became known for this specialty and advanced the depth of techniques for Qin na and Wrestling within his lineage of Baguazhang.

Later he took the core principles of the Yin Style system he learned and modified aspects of areas of practice to better fit his size and skills leading to variations of the 8 Animal/Moving palms and the 8 fixed postures. He took aspects of the softer practices of Taiji Quan and utilized them when practicing aspects of the Shaolin sets and techniques ultimately creating a merger between his Taiji and Bagua practices which he referred to as 'Bagua Taiji'. He also utilizing line drills taught many of the 64 hands and their variations.

=== Distribution ===
Yin stylists are most concentrated in Beijing, where practitioners of the lineages of Ma Gui, Yin Yuzhang, Cao Zhongsheng, Li Baosen, Li Yongqing, Men Baozhen, and others still practice and teach today. Certain Yin styles have moved to other locations as well, however, such as the Cui Zhendong lineage in Shanghai and the Gong Baotian lineage in Shanghai, Shandong, and Taiwan. Famous practitioners in Beijing today include Zhang Zhao Ren, He Puren (deceased), Wang Shangzhi, Zhang Lie, Zhao Zeren, Lu Shengli, Zhu Baozhen (deceased), Xu Shi Xi and He Jinbao. Others include Huang Zhicheng of Shandong, He Jinghan of Taiwan, Michael Guen of California, Zhang Yun and Tu Kun-Yii of New Jersey, US.
