= Lai Zhide =

Neo-Confucian philosopher (1525–1604)

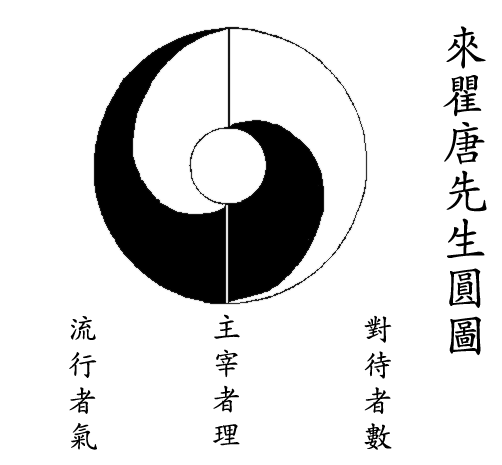
The Taijitu of Lai Zhide

Lái Zhīdé (來知德 / 来知德; also Lái Qútáng 來瞿唐 / 来瞿唐, 1525–1604) was a Ming period Neo-Confucian philosopher. He introduced into Chinese philosophy the well-known "Yin and Yang symbol", the taijitu (a "diagram of the great ultimate"). Lai Zhide is the author of an I Ching commentary, the Explanation of the Classic of Change Annotated by Mr Lai (ed. Zheng Can 1988).

== See also ==
- Li Zhi (Ming Dynasty)
- Zhou Dun-yi, an 11th-century Neo-Confucian who had also presented a taijitu
