= Taegeuk =

Traditional Korean symbol

- The taegeuk found on the flag and emblem of South Korea

Korean name
- Hangul: 태극
- Hanja: 太極
- RR: taegeuk
- MR: t'aegŭk

Taegeuk (Korean: 태극; Hanja: 太極, Korean pronunciation: [tʰɛgɯk̚]) is a Sino-Korean term meaning "supreme ultimate", although it can also be translated as "great polarity / duality / extremes". The term and its overall concept is derived from the Chinese Taiji, popularised in the west as the yin and yang. The symbol was chosen for the design of the Korean national flag in the 1880s. It substitutes the black and white color scheme often seen in most taijitu illustrations with blue and red, respectively, along with a horizontal separator, as opposed to vertical.

South Koreans commonly refer to their national flag as Taegeukgi (태극기), where gi (기) means "flag" or "banner". This particular color-themed taegeuk symbol is typically associated with Korean traditions and represents balance in the universe; the red half represents positive cosmic forces, and the blue half represents the complementary or opposing, negative cosmic forces. It is also used in Korean shamanism, Confucianism, Taoism, and Buddhism.

== History ==
The taegeuk diagram has been existent for the majority of written Korean history. The origins of the interlocking-sinusoid design in Korea can be traced to as early as the Goguryeo or Silla period, e.g. in the decoration of a sword, dated to the 5th or 6th century, recovered from the grave of Michu of Silla, or an artifact with the taegeuk pattern of similar age found in the Bogam-ri tombs of Baekje at Naju, South Jeolla Province in 2008. In the compound of Gameunsa, a temple built in AD 628 during the reign of King Jinpyeong of Silla, a stone object, perhaps the foundation of a pagoda, is carved with the taegeuk design.

Although some theories suggest that the Yin and Yang philosophy from early Chinese civilization may have influenced Gojoseon, there is currently no direct archaeological evidence linking the Taegeuk design itself to this period. Instead, the earliest known artifacts with recognizable Taegeuk or interlocking spiral motifs have been found in the Goguryeo, Baekje, and Silla kingdoms, dating from the 5th to 7th centuries. These findings indicate that the Taegeuk motif may have developed independently within the Korean cultural sphere.

Today the taegeuk is usually associated with Korean tradition and represents balance in the universe, as mentioned in the previous section (red is 양; yang, or positive cosmic forces, and blue is 음; eum, or negative cosmic forces). Among its many religious connotations (Korean Confucianism; Taoism in Korea; Korean Buddhism), the taegeuk is also present in Korean shamanism.

== Use in national flag ==
The Flag of South Korea, also known as the Taegeukgi (태극기), has a blue and red taegeuk in the center.

The taegeuk symbol is most prominently displayed in the center of national flag of the Republic of Korea, called the Taegeukgi, literally taegeuk flag (along with four of the eight trigrams used in divination). Because of the Taegeuk's association with the national flag, it is often used as a patriotic symbol, as are the colors red, blue, and black.

Though the taegeuk and the trigrams have been used since the earliest periods of Korean history, its use had started earlier in China.

The taegeuk is a Taoist icon which symbolizes cosmic balance, and represents the constant interaction between the yin and yang, also known as eum/yang (Korean: 음양; Hanja: 陰陽). The taegeuk symbol used on the flag originated from the Chinese Confucian classic known as The Book of Changes (also known as I Ching or Yijing), a book developed for use in divination.

The four trigrams also originated from the I Ching; each of these trigrams represent specific Confucian virtues, cosmic elements, or family roles, in addition to seasons, compass directions, etc. The geon (건) trigram (☰) represents the heaven (sky), summer, south, father, and justice. The gon (곤) trigram (☷) symbolizes the earth (ground), winter, north, mother, and vitality, the gam (감) trigram (☵) the moon, autumn, west, 2nd (or middle) son, and wisdom, and the ri (리) trigram (☲) the sun, spring, east, 2nd (or middle) daughter, and fruition. The four trigrams supposedly move in an endless cycle from geon to ri to gon to gam and back to geon in their pursuit of perfection.

The white background symbolizes the homogeneity, integrity and purity of the Korean people. For thousands of years, Korean people nearly exclusively wore white clothing. This eventually led to the rise of the nickname "white-clothed people" for Koreans. Therefore, the colour white is often considered associated with the Korean people.

Prior to 1948, the taeguk was used in northern Korea and has since been replaced by Soviet-inspired communist symbols including the flag of the Democratic People's Republic of Korea.

== Variants ==
=== Tricolored taegeuk ===
Tricolored taegeuk encircled by pal gwae

A variant in South Korea is the tricolored taegeuk (삼색의 태극; samsaegui taegeuk or 삼태극; samtaegeuk), which adds a yellow lobe or pa (파; 巴). The yellow portion is taken as representing humanity, in addition to the red and blue representing earth and heaven, respectively.

A rendition of the tricolored taegeuk also appeared in the official logo of the 1988 Summer Olympics accompanied by the five Olympic rings.

=== Paralympics symbol ===
First Paralympic symbol (1988–1994) used five pa.

The first designated Paralympic logo, created for the 1988 Summer Paralympics in Seoul, was based on the traditional pa, the spiral or sinusoid components making up the taegeuk symbol. In March 1992, the Paralympic symbol was changed to a version utilizing only three pa. This was not fully adopted until after the 1994 Winter Paralympics in Lillehammer, Norway, since the Lillehammer Paralympic Organizing Committee had by then already started a marketing program based on the five-pa version. The three-pa version remained in place from the close of the Lillehammer Games through the 2004 Summer Paralympics in Athens, Greece. The current Paralympic symbol has morphed the teardrop-shaped pa into more of a swoosh, but still employs three such colour swatches, one each of red, blue, and green.

=== Miss Asia Pacific World ===
The logo for the Miss Asia Pacific World Beauty Pageant, which began in Seoul, South Korea in 2011, is another example of the tricolored taegeuk symbol.

=== Governmental emblem ===
The Government of South Korea unveiled a new uniform visual identity for governmental institutions on 15 March 2016; it uses a stylized blue pa with a red arch, representing the country's history and traditions and its vision for the future. This replaced the former Hibiscus syriacus insignia used by the government as well as insignia used by 51 government ministries and 700 government institutions, which lacked consistency and thus were hardly recognized by citizens.

== Gallery ==
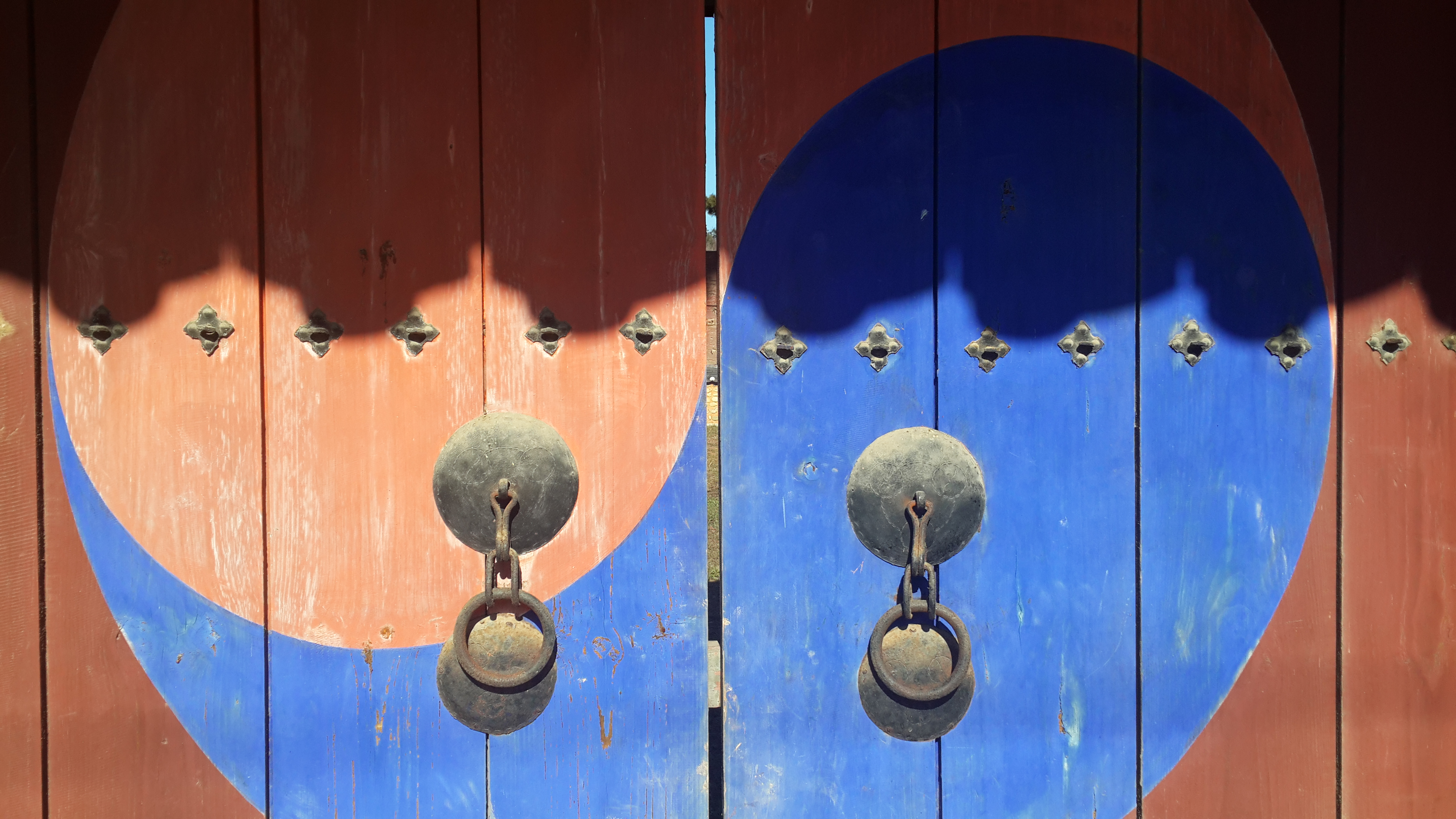
Taegeuk pattern painted on the gate of a house in Naju

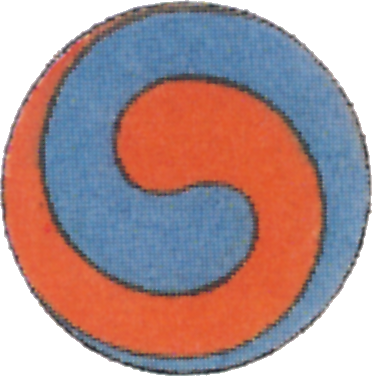
Taegeuk in the 1899 book Heraldischer Atlas

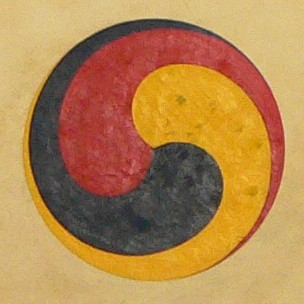
Tricolored taegeuk on a buk drum

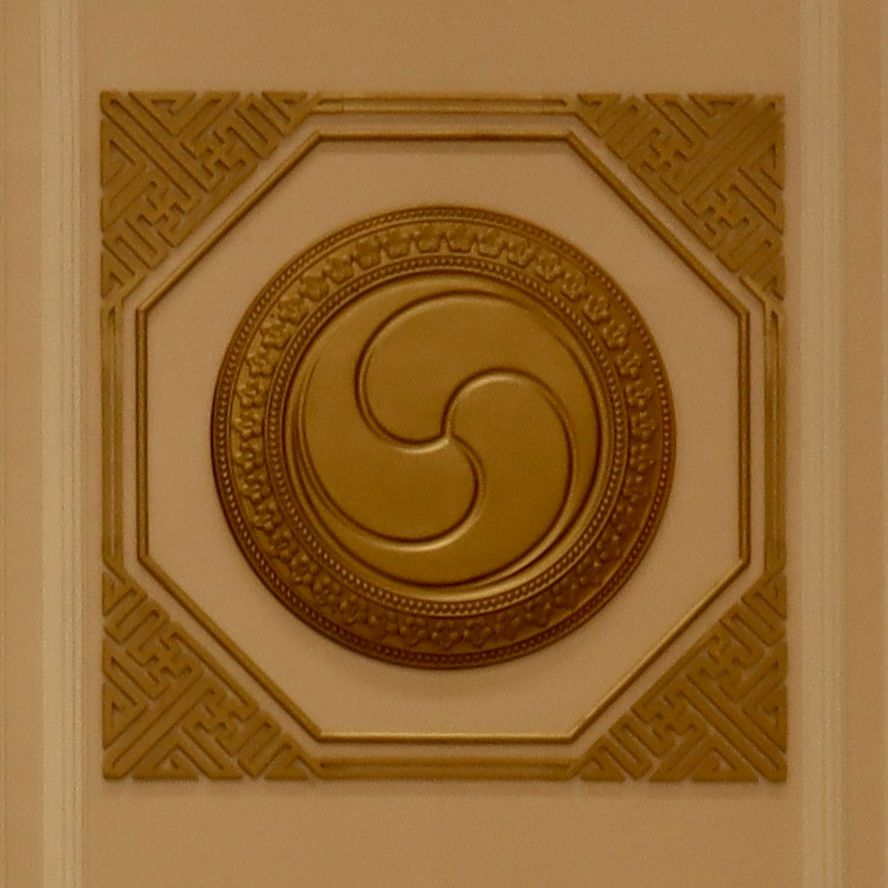
Samtaegeuk on the Reception Hall of the Blue House

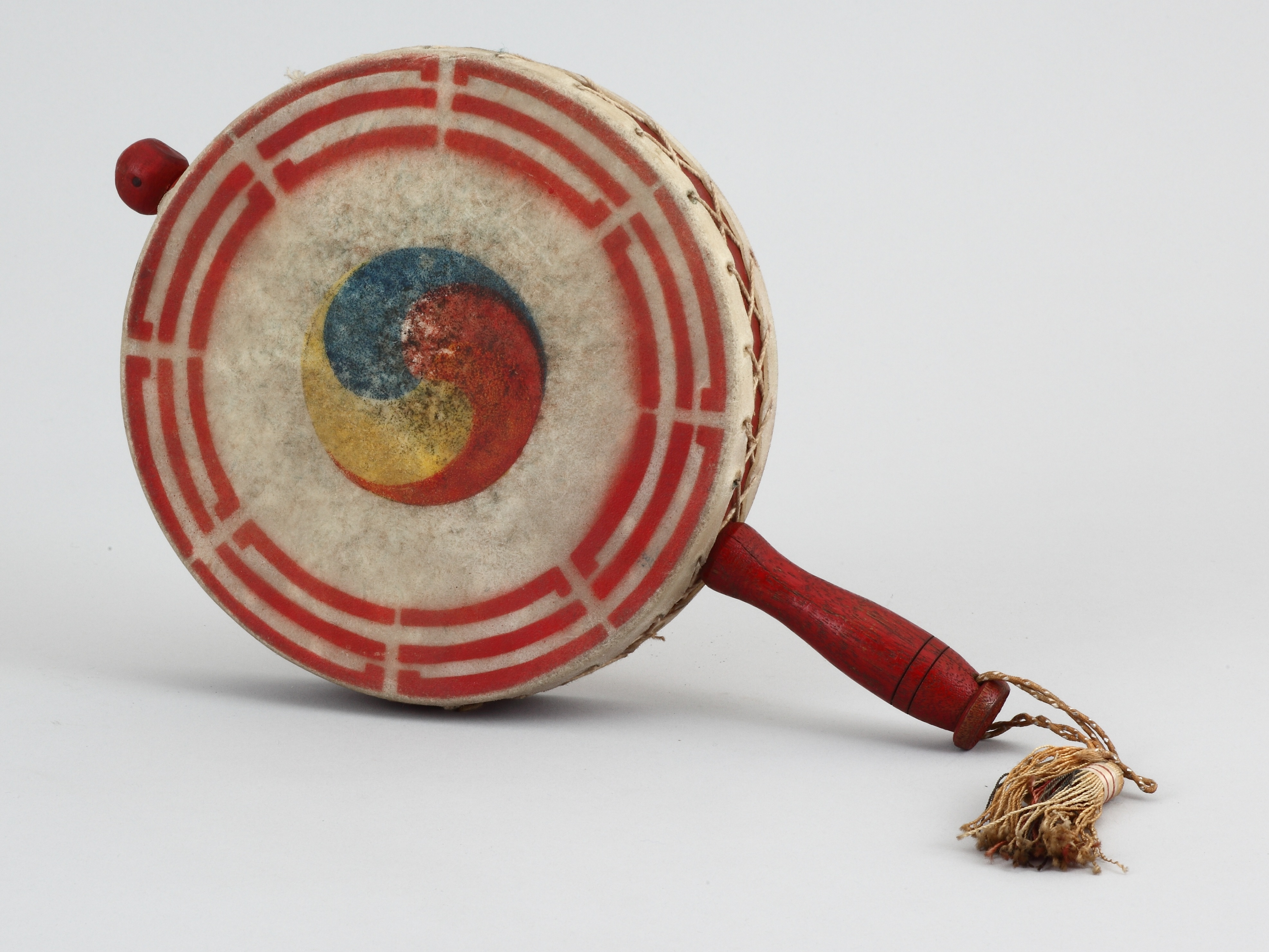
Sogo with taegeuk

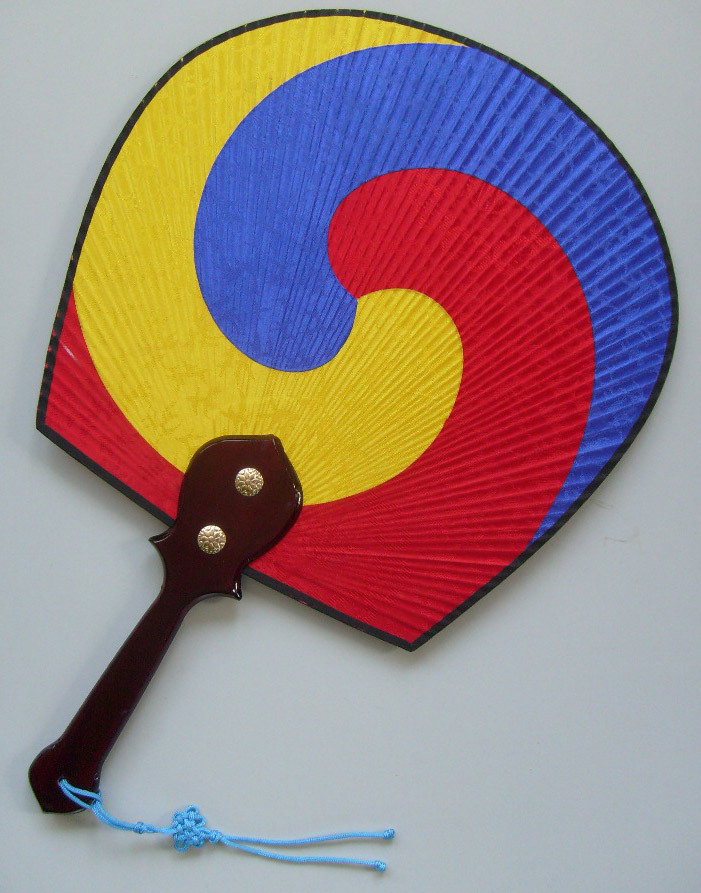
Hand fan with a tricolored taegeuk design

The stylized government emblem unveiled in 2016.

== See also ==
- Culture of Korea
- Gankyil
- Korean philosophy
- Taegeuk (taekwondo)
- Taekwondo
- Taiji (philosophy)
- Taijitu
- Tomoe
- Yin and Yang
