= Gankyil =

Buddhist wheel of joy symbol

Gankyil Unicode symbol (U+0FCB), ࿋, as rendered in Jomolhari font.

The Gankyil (Tibetan: དགའ་འཁྱིལ།, Lhasa [kã˥ kʲʰiː˥]) or "wheel of joy" (Sanskrit: ānanda-cakra) is a symbol and ritual tool used in Tibetan and East Asian Buddhism. It is composed of three (sometimes two or four) swirling and interconnected blades. The traditional spinning direction is clockwise (right turning), but the counter-clockwise ones are also common.

The gankyil as inner wheel of the dharmachakra is depicted on the Flag of Sikkim, Joseon, and is also depicted on the Flag of Tibet and Emblem of Tibet.

== Exegesis ==
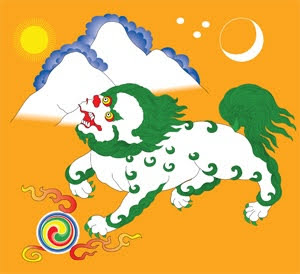
Tibetan flag derived from 7th century's army flag, officially used in 1920–1925.

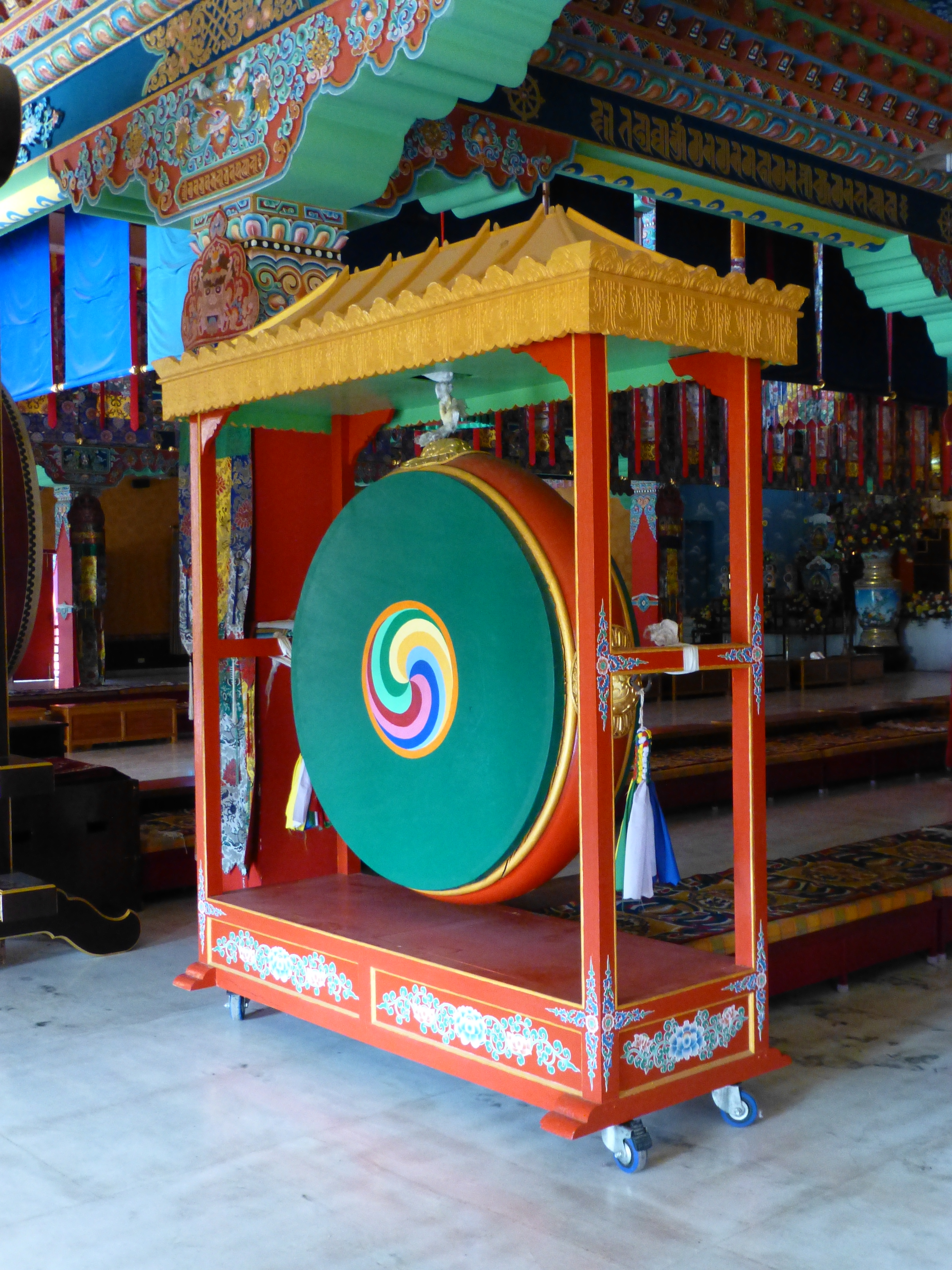
Tibetan drum with a four color Gankyil

A trikhep (Wylie: khri khebs "throne cover") from 19th century Bhutan. Throne covers were placed atop the temple cushions used by high lamas. The central circular swirling symbol is the gankyil in its mode as the "Four Joys".

The Flag of Sikkim includes a triune gankyil.

In addition to linking the gankyil with the "wish-fulfilling jewel" (Skt. cintamani), Robert Beer makes the following connections:

The gakyil or 'wheel of joy' is depicted in a similar form to the ancient Chinese yin-yang symbol, but its swirling central hub is usually composed of either three or four sections. The Tibetan term dga' is used to describe all forms of joy, delight, and pleasure, and the term 'khyil means to circle or spin. The wheel of joy is commonly depicted at the central hub of the dharmachakra, where its three or four swirls may represent the Three Jewels and victory over the three poisons, or the Four Noble Truths and the four directions. As a symbol of the Three Jewels it may also appear as the "triple-eyed" or wish-granting gem of the chakravartin. In the Dzogchen tradition the three swirls of the gakyil primarily symbolize the trinity of the base, path, and fruit.

— Robert Beer, The Handbook of Tibetan Buddhist Symbols

The "victory" referred to above is symbolised by the dhvaja or "victory banner".

The divisions of the teaching of Dzogchen are for the purposes of explanation only. Realization is not something that must be constructed; to become realized simply means to discover and manifest that which from the very beginning has been our own true condition: the Zhi (gzhi) or Base. And, in particular, in Dzogchen－which not a gradual Path－the Path consists in remaining in the unveiled, manifest condition of the primordial state or Base, or in other words, in the condition which is the Fruit. This is why the Gankyil, the symbol of primordial energy, which is a particular symbol of the Dzogchen teachings, has three parts which spiral in a way that makes them fundamentally one. The Gankyil, or "Wheel of Joy", can clearly be seen to reflect the inseparability and interdependence of all the groups of three in the Dzogchen teachings, but perhaps most particularly it shows the inseparability of the Base, the Path, and the Fruit. And since Dzogchen, the Great Perfection, is essentially the self-perfected indivisibility of the primordial state, it naturally requires a non-dual symbol to represent it.

Wallace (2001: p. 77) identifies the ānandacakra with the heart of the "cosmic body" of which Mount Meru is the epicentre:

In the center of the summit of Mt Meru, there is the inner lotus (garbha-padma) of the Bhagavan Kalacakra, which has sixteen petals and constitutes the bliss-cakra (ananda-cakra) of the cosmic body.

== Associated triunes ==
=== Ground, path, and fruit ===
- "ground", "base" (Tibetan: གཞི།, Wylie: gzhi)
- "path", "method" (Tibetan: ལམ།, Wylie: lam)
- "fruit", "product" (Tibetan: འབྲས།, Wylie: 'bras)

=== Three humours of traditional Tibetan medicine ===
Attributes connected with the three humors (Sanskrit: tridoshas, Tibetan: nyi pa gsum):

- Desire (Tibetan: འདོད་ཆགས། ’dod chags) is aligned with the humor Wind (rlung, Tibetan: རླུང་།, Wylie: rlung, Sanskrit: vata - "air and aether constitution")
- Hatred (Tibetan: ཞེ་སྡང་། zhe sdang) is aligned with the humor Bile (Tripa, Tibetan: མཁྲིས་པ། mkhris pa, Sanskrit: pitta - "fire and water constitution")
- Ignorance (Tibetan: གཏི་མུག gti mug) is aligned with the humor Phlegm (Béken Tibetan: བད་ཀན། bad kan, Sanskrit: kapha - "earth and water constitution").

=== Study, reflection, and meditation ===
- Study (Tibetan: ཐོས་པ། thos + pa)
- Reflection (Tibetan: བསམ་པ། sam+ pa)
- Meditation (Tibetan: སྒོམ་པ། sgom pa)

These three aspects are the mūlaprajñā of the sādhanā of the prajñāpāramitā, the "pāramitā of wisdom". Hence, these three are related to, but distinct from, the Prajñāpāramitā that denotes a particular cycle of discourse in the Buddhist literature that relates to the doctrinal field (kṣetra) of the second turning of the dharmacakra.

=== Mula dharmas of the path ===
The Dzogchen teachings focus on three terms:

- View (Tibetan: ལྟ་བ། lta-ba),
- Meditation (Tibetan: སྒོམ་པ། sgom pa),
- Action (Tibetan: སྤྱོད་པ། spyod-pa).

=== Triratna doctrine ===
The Triratna, Triple Jewel or Three Gems are triunic are therefore represented by the Gankyil:

- Buddha (Tibetan: སངས་རྒྱས།, Sangye, Wyl. sangs rgyas)
- Dharma (Tibetan: ཆོས།, Cho; Wyl. chos)
- Sangha (Tibetan: དགེ་དུན།, Gendun; Wyl. dge 'dun)

=== Three Roots ===
The Three Roots are:

- Guru (Tibetan: བླ་མ།, Wyl. bla ma)
- Yidam (Tibetan: ཡི་དམ།, Wyl. yi dam; Skt. istadevata)
- Dakini (Tibetan: མཁའ་འགྲོ་མ།, Khandroma; Wyl. mkha 'gro ma )

=== Three Higher Trainings ===
The three higher trainings (Tibetan:ལྷག་བའི་བསླབ་པ་གསུམ་, lhagpe labpa sum, or Wyl. bslab pa gsum)

- discipline (Tibetan: ཚུལ་ཁྲིམས་ཀྱི་བསླབ་པ།, Wyl. tshul khrims kyi bslab pa)
- meditation (Tibetan: ཏིང་ངེ་འཛན་གྱི་བསླབ་པ།, Wyl. ting nge 'dzin gyi bslab pa)
- wisdom (Tibetan: ཤེས་རབ་ཀྱི་བསླབ་པ།, Wyl. shes rab kyi bslab pa )

=== Three Dharma Seals ===
The indivisible essence of the Three Dharma Seals (ལྟ་བ་བཀའ་རྟགས་ཀྱི་ཕྱག་རྒྱ་གསུམ།) is embodied and encoded within the Gankyil:

- Impermanence (Tibetan: འདུ་བྱེ་ཐམས་ཅད་མི་རྟག་ཅིང་།)
- anatta (Tibetan: ཆོས་རྣམས་སྟོང་ཞིང་བདག་མེད་པ།)
- Nirvana (Tibetan: མྱང་ངན་འདས་པ་ཞི་བའོ།།)

=== Three Turnings of the Wheel of Dharma ===
As the inner wheel of the Vajrayana Dharmacakra, the gankyil also represents the syncretic union and embodiment of Gautama Buddha's Three Turnings of the Wheel of Dharma. The pedagogic upaya doctrine and classification of the "three turnings of the wheel" was first postulated by the Yogacara school.

=== Trikaya doctrine ===
The gankyil is the energetic signature of the Trikaya, realised through the transmutation of the obscurations forded by the Three poisons (refer klesha) and therefore in the Bhavachakra the Gankyil is an aniconic depiction of the snake, boar and fowl. Gankyil is to Dharmachakra, as still eye is to cyclone, as Bindu is to Mandala. The Gankyil is the inner wheel of the Vajrayana Dharmacakra (refer Himalayan Ashtamangala).

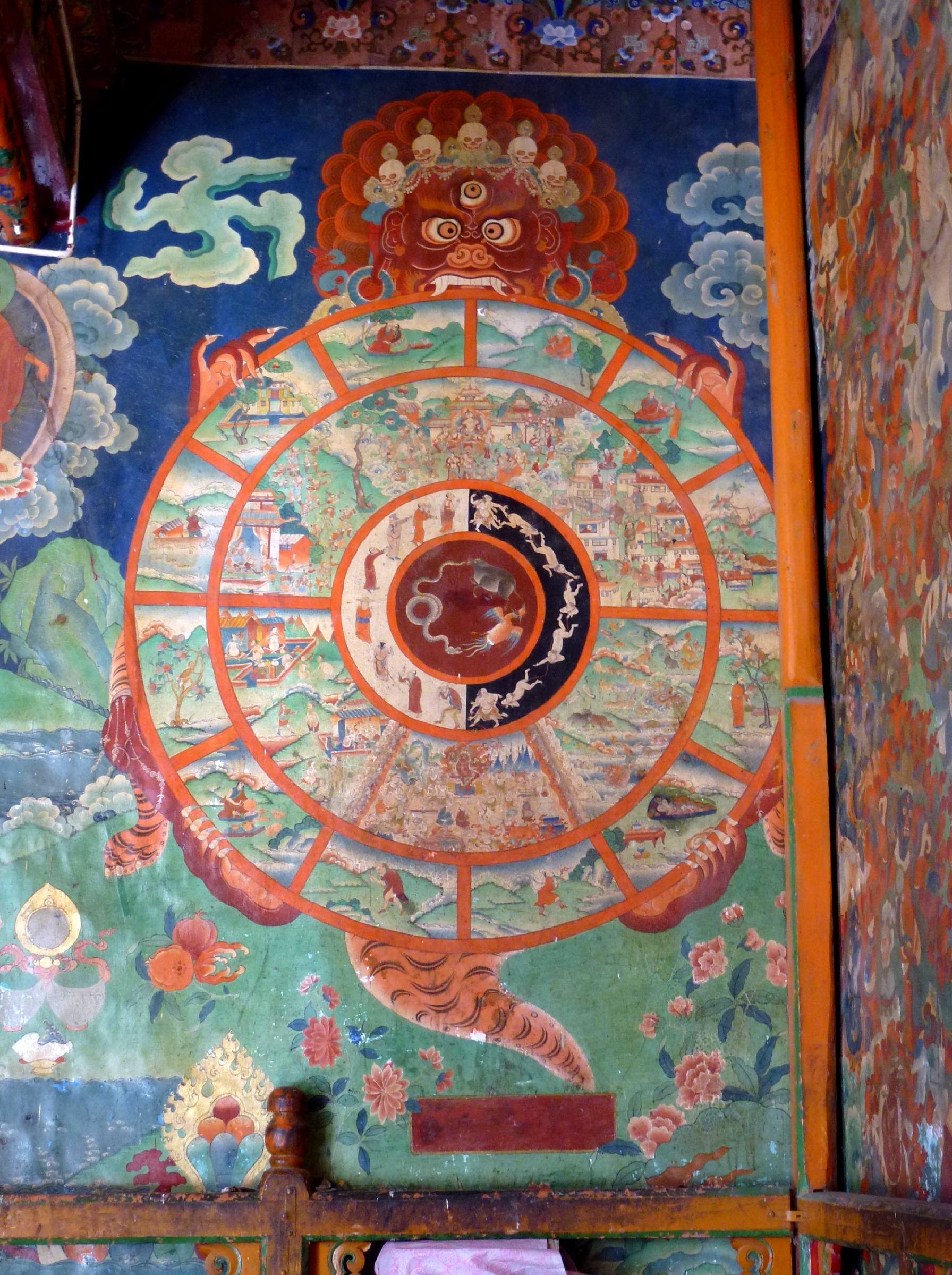
Tibetan Bhavacakra in Sera, Lhasa.

The Gankyil is symbolic of the Trikaya doctrine of dharmakaya (Tibetan: ཆོས་སྐུ།, Wyl.Chos sku), sambhogakaya (Tibetan:ལོངས་སྐུ་ Wyl. longs sku) and nirmanakaya (Tibetan:སྤྲུལ་སྐུ། Wyl.sprul sku) and also of the Buddhist understanding of the interdependence of the Three Vajras: of mind, voice and body. The divisions of the teaching of Dzogchen are for the purposes of explanation only; just as the Gankyil divisions are understood to dissolve in the energetic whirl of the Wheel of Joy.

=== Three cycles of Nyingmapa Dzogchen ===
The Gankyil also embodies the three cycles of Nyingma Dzogchen codified by Mañjuśrīmitra:

- Semde [Tibetan:སེམས་སྡེ།]
- Longdé [Tibetan:ཀློང་སྡེ།]
- Mengagde [Tibetan:མན་ངག་སྡེ།]

This classification determined the exposition of the Dzogchen teachings in the subsequent centuries.

=== Three Spheres ===
"Three spheres" (Sanskrit: trimandala; Tibetan: འཁོར་གསུམ།'khor gsum). The conceptualizations pertaining to:

- subject,
- object, and
- action

=== Sound, light and rays ===
The triunic continua of the esoteric Dzogchen doctrine of 'sound, light and rays' (སྒྲ་འོད་ཟེར་གསུམ། Wylie: sgra 'od zer gsum) is held within the energetic signature of the Gankyil. The doctrine of 'Sound, light and rays' is intimately connected with the Dzogchen teaching of the 'three aspects of the manifestation of energy'. Though thoroughly interpenetrating and nonlocalised, 'sound' may be understood to reside at the heart, the 'mind'-wheel; 'light' at the throat, the 'voice'-wheel; and 'rays' at the head, the 'body'-wheel. Some Dzogchen lineages for various purposes, locate 'rays' at the Ah-wheel (for Five Pure Lights pranayama) and 'light' at the Aum-wheel (for rainbow body), and there are other enumerations.

=== Three lineages of Nyingmapa Dzogchen ===
The Gankyil also embodies the three tantric lineages as Penor Rinpoche, a Nyingmapa, states:

According to the history of the origin of tantras there are three lineages:

- The Lineage of Buddha's Intention, which refers to the teachings of the Truth Body originating from the primordial Buddha Samantabhadra, who is said to have taught tantras to an assembly of completely enlightened beings emanated from the Truth Body itself. Therefore, this level of teaching is considered as being completely beyond the reach of ordinary human beings.
- The Lineage of the Knowledge Holders corresponds to the teachings of the Enjoyment Body originating from Vajrasattva and Vajrapani, whose human lineage begins with Garab Dorje of the Ögyan Dakini land. From him the lineage passed to Manjushrimitra, Shrisimha and then to Guru Rinpoche, Jnanasutra, Vimalamitra and Vairochana who disseminated it in Tibet.
- Lastly, the Human Whispered Lineage corresponds to the teachings of the Emanation Body, originating from the Five Buddha Families. They were passed on to Shrisimha, who transmitted them to Guru Rinpoche, who in giving them to Vimalamitra started the lineage which has continued in Tibet until the present day.

=== Three aspects of energy in Dzogchen ===
The Gankyil also embodies the energy manifested in the three aspects that yield the energetic emergence (Tibetan: རང་བྱུན། rang byung) of phenomena ( Tibetan: ཆོས་ Wylie: "chos" Sanskrit: dharmas) and sentient beings (Tibetan: ཡིད་ཅན། yid can):

1. dang (གདངས། Wylie: gDangs), this is an infinite and formless level of compassionate energy and reflective capacity, it is "an awareness free from any restrictions and as an energy free from any limits or form."
2. rolpa (རོལ་པ། Wylie: Rol-pa). These are the manifestations which appear to be internal to the individual (such as when a crystal ball seems to reflect something inside itself).
3. tsal (རྩལ། Wylie: rTsal, is "the manifestation of the energy of the individual him or herself, as an apparently 'external' world," though this apparent externality is only just "a manifestation of our own energy, at the level of Tsal." This is explained through the use of a crystal prism which reflects and refracts white light into various other forms of light.

Though not discrete correlates, dang equates to dharmakaya; rolpa to sambhogakaya; and tsal to nirmanakaya.

== In Bon ==
=== Three Treasures of Yungdrung Bon ===
In Bon, the gankyil denotes the three principal terma cycles of Yungdrung Bon: the Northern Treasure (Wylie: byang gter), the Central Treasure (Wylie: dbus gter) and the Southern Treasure (Wylie: lho gter). The Northern Treasure is compiled from texts revealed in Zhangzhung and northern Tibet, the Southern Treasure from texts revealed in Bhutan and southern Tibet, and the Central Treasure from texts revealed in Ü-Tsang near Samye.

The gankyil is the central part of the shang (Tibetan: gchang), a traditional ritual tool and instrument of the Bönpo shaman.

== See also ==
- Borromean rings
- Taegeuk
- Taijitu
- Tomoe
- Triskelion
