= Wuji (philosophy) =

The primordial in Chinese philosophy

Chinese name
- Traditional Chinese: 無極
- Simplified Chinese: 无极
- Literal meaning: "without limit"
Transcriptions
Standard Mandarin
- Hanyu Pinyin: Wújí
- Wade–Giles: Wu-chi
Wu
- Romanization: vu jih
Yue: Cantonese
- Jyutping: Mou4 gik6
- IPA: [mȍu kɪ̀k]
Southern Min
- Hokkien POJ: bô-ke̍k

Vietnamese name
- Vietnamese alphabet: Vô cực
- Chữ Hán: 無極

Korean name
- Hangul: 무극
- Hanja: 無極
Transcriptions
- Revised Romanization: Mugeuk
- McCune–Reischauer: Mugŭk

Japanese name
- Kanji: 無極
- Kana: むきょく
Transcriptions
- Romanization: Mukyoku

In Chinese philosophy, wuji (simplified Chinese: 无极; traditional Chinese: 無極; lit. 'without roof/ridgepole', meaning 'without limit') originally referred to infinity. In Neo-Confucian cosmology, it came to mean the "primordial universe" prior to the "Supreme Ultimate" state of being.

== Definition ==
In Chinese, the word wuji is a compound of wu (meaning nothingness) and ji. Ji (極) is a word with several meanings. Most often used to mean "pole" or "ridgepole", it can also be used in the same figurative as in English to mean "geographical pole", "magnetic pole", etc. In Traditional Chinese medicine it is the Chong mai (衝脈) or the central Meridian of the eight extra Meridians.

Common English translations of the cosmological wuji are "ultimateless" or "limitless", but other versions are "the ultimate of Nothingness", "that which has no Pole", or "Non-Polar".

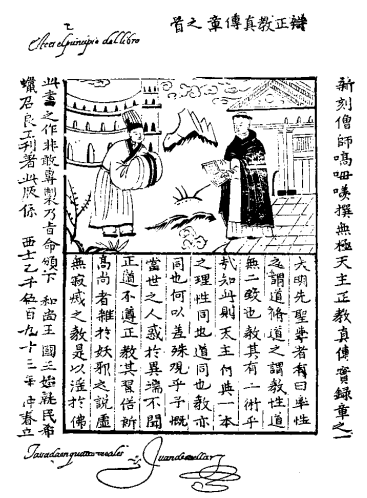
The Rectificación y Mejora de Principios Naturales 天主教真傳實錄 (1593) by Fr. Juan Cobo, refers to the Christian god as Wuji Tianzhu, 'Infinite Lord of Heaven'.

== Usage ==
Wuji references are found in Chinese classic texts associated with diverse schools of Chinese philosophy, including Taoism, Confucianism, and the School of Names. Zhang and Ryden summarize the philosophical transformation of wuji:

The expression 'limitless' and its relatives are found in the Laozi and the Zhuangzi and also in writings of the logicians. It has no special philosophical meaning. In Song-dynasty philosophy, however, the same expression 'limitless' should be translated as 'ultimate of beinglessness,' for the negative element is no longer qualifying the word 'limit' but is rather qualified by the word 'limit,' here to be translated into Song philosophical jargon as 'ultimate'.

=== Tao Te Ching ===
The term wuji first appears in the Tao Te Ching (c. 4th century BCE) in the context of returning to one's original nature:

Know whiteness, maintain blackness, and be a model for all under heaven. By being a model for all under heaven, eternal integrity will not err. If eternal integrity does not err, You will return to infinity.
知其白，守其黑，為天下式。為天下式，常德不忒，復歸於無極。

— (Mair 1990, chapter 28, p. 93)

This is an instance of how wuji with "integrity" (Chinese: 德) can become dualistic by dividing into yin and yang.

Following this interaction the Tao transforms into the One, which becomes the Two, and then the Three. The ten thousand things (the universe) then comes into existence:

道生一，一生二，二生三，三生万物。

— Tao Te Ching

=== Zhuangzi ===
The Taoist Zhuangzi (c. 3rd–2nd centuries BCE) uses wuji four times. According to Zhang and Ryden, in Zhuangzi the word wuji "always refers to the infinite and the boundless."

I was astounded by his words, which were limitless as the Milky Way. They were extravagant and remote from human experience.
吾驚怖其言，猶河漢而無極也；大有徑庭，不近人情焉。

— (Mair 1994, chapter 1, p. 6)

Who can associate in non-association and cooperate in non-cooperation? Who can ascend to heaven and wander in the mists, bounding through infinity, forgetting themselves in life forever and ever without end?
孰能相與於无相與，相為於无相為？孰能登天遊霧，撓挑無極，相忘以生，无所終窮？

— (Mair 1994, chapter 6, p. 59)

To enter the gate of inexhaustibility And to roam in the fields of infinity. I shall mingle my light with that of the sun and moon, And will become eternal with heaven and earth.
入无窮之門，以遊无極之野。吾與日月參光，吾與天地為常。

— (Mair 1994, chapter 11, p. 97)

[He] would forget everything, yet he would possess everything. His tranquility would be unlimited, yet a multitude of excellences would follow in his wake. This is the Way of heaven and earth, the integrity of the sage.
无不忘也，无不有也，澹然无極而衆美從之。此天地之道，聖人之德也。)

— (Mair 1994, chapter 15, p. 145)

The Zhuangzi also uses the related word wuqiong (無窮; "infinite; endless; inexhaustible") 25 times, for instance,

Supposing there were someone who could ride upon the truth of heaven and earth, who could chariot upon the transformations of the six vital breaths and thereby go wandering in infinity, what would he have to rely on?
若夫乘天地之正，而御六氣之辯，以遊無窮者，彼且惡乎待哉？

— (Mair 1994, chapter 1, p. 6)

The Zhuangzi uses wuqiong quoting a relativistic theory from the School of Names philosopher Hui Shi; "The southern direction is limitless yet it has a limit."

=== Xunzi ===
The (c. 3rd century BCE) Confucian text Xunzi uses wuji (meaning 'boundless') three times. In one context it is used to describe a legendary horse and is paralleled with wuqiong, used to mean "inexhaustible".

Qiji could cover 1,000 li in a single day, but if a worn-out nag takes the journey in ten stages, then it, too, can cover the distance. Are you going to try to exhaust the inexhaustible and pursue the boundless? If you do, then though you break your bones and wear out your flesh in the attempt, in the end it will be impossible to reach your goal.
夫驥一日而千里，駑馬十駕則亦及之矣。將以窮無窮，逐無極與？其折骨絶筋，終身不可以相及也。

— (Knoblock 1988, chapter 2, p. 155)

=== Huainanzi ===
The 2nd-century BCE Huainanzi uses Wuji six times. One syntactically playful passage says a sage can qiong wuqiong (窮無窮 "exhaust the inexhaustible"; also used in Xunzi above) and ji wuji (極無極 "[go to the] extreme [of] the extremeless").

It is only these men who know how to preserve the root from which all creation springs, and the causes, or antecedents, of all the affairs of life. Therefore they are all able to pursue their investigations without limit, and to reach that which has no end; they understand all things thoroughly, without any misconception or delusion; they respond to all requirements as the echo to a sound, and that untiringly; and this ability may be called the endowment of Heaven.
萬物有所生，而獨知守其根；百事有所出，而獨知守其門。故窮無窮，極無極，照物而不眩，響應而不乏，此之謂天解。

— (Balfour 1884, chapter 1, p. 86)

=== Liezi ===
The (c. 4th century CE) Taoist Liezi uses wuji (meaning "limitless") eight times in a cosmological dialogue (with wuqiong, meaning "inexhaustible", once).

"Have there always been things?"
–"If once there were no things, how come there are things now? Would you approve if the men who live after us say there are no things now?"

"In that case, do things have no before and after?"
–"The ending and starting of things have no limit from which they began. The start of one is the end of another, the end of one is the start of another. Who knows which came first? But what is outside things, what was before events, I do not know"

"In that case, is everything limited and exhaustible above and below in the eight directions?"

"I do not know"
不知也
...It is Nothing which is limitless, Something which is inexhaustible.
無則無極，有則有盡
(2) How do I know this?
朕何以知之？

[textual lacuna] ...

(3) But also there is nothing limitless outside what is limitless, and nothing inexhaustible within what is inexhaustible. There is no limit, but neither is there anything limitless; there is no exhausting, but neither is there anything inexhaustible. That is why I know that they are limitless and inexhaustible, yet do not know where they may be limited and exhaustible"
然無極之外復無無極，無盡之中復無無盡。無極復無無極，無盡復無無盡。朕以是知其無極無盡也，而不知其有極有盡也

— (Graham 1990, chapter 5, pp. 94-5)

=== Taijitu shuo ===
Zhou's Taijitu diagram

The 11th-century Taijitu shuo (太極圖說, "Explanation of the Diagram of the Supreme Ultimate"), written by Zhou Dunyi, was the cornerstone of Neo-Confucianist cosmology. His brief text synthesized Confucianist metaphysics of the I Ching with aspects of Daoism and Chinese Buddhism. In his Taijitu diagram, wuji is represented as a blank circle and taiji as a circle with a center point (world embryo) or with broken and unbroken lines (yin and yang). However, Zhou thought of wuji and taiji as ultimately the same principle and concept that created movement, life, and "the ten thousand transformations" (things).

Zhou's key terms wuji and taiji appear in the famous opening phrase wuji er taiji (無極而太極), which Adler notes could also be translated "The Supreme Polarity that is Non-Polar!".

Non-polar (wuji) and yet Supreme Polarity (taiji)! The Supreme Polarity in activity generates yang; yet at the limit of activity it is still. In stillness it generates yin; yet at the limit of stillness it is also active. Activity and stillness alternate; each is the basis of the other. In distinguishing yin and yang, the Two Modes are thereby established. The alternation and combination of yang and yin generate water, fire, wood, metal, and earth. With these five [phases of] qi harmoniously arranged, the Four Seasons proceed through them. The Five Phases are simply yin and yang; yin and yang are simply the Supreme Polarity; the Supreme Polarity is fundamentally Non-polar. [Yet] in the generation of the Five Phases, each one has its nature.

Robinet explains the relationship.

The taiji is the One that contains Yin and Yang, or the Three (as stated in Hanshu 21A). This Three is, in Taoist terms, the One (Yang) plus the Two (Yin), or the Three that gives life to all beings (Daode jing 42), the One that virtually contains the multiplicity. Thus, the wuji is a limitless void, whereas the taiji is a limit in the sense that it is the beginning and the end of the world, a turning point. The wuji is the mechanism of both movement and quiescence; it is situated before the differentiation between movement and quiescence, metaphorically located in the space-time between the kun 坤, or pure Yin, and fu 復, the return of the Yang. In other terms, while the Taoists state that taiji is metaphysically preceded by wuji, which is the Dao, the Neo-Confucians say that the taiji is the Dao.

== See also ==
- Brahman
- Ein Sof
- Emergent Universe
- Hundun
- Monad (philosophy)
- Tohu wa-bohu

== Sources ==
- Adler, Joseph A. (1999). "Zhou Dunyi: The Metaphysics and Practice of Sagehood". In de Bary, William Theodore; Bloom, Irene (eds.). Sources of Chinese Tradition (2nd ed.). New York: Columbia University Press. pp. 669–677. ISBN 0-231-10938-5.
- Balfour, Frederic H. (1884). Taoist Texts, Ethical, Political, and Speculative. London: Trübner. OCLC 1434478466 – via HathiTrust.
- Chang, Carsun (1957). The Development of Neo-Confucian Thought. New York: Bookman Associates. OCLC 1203568791.
- Fung Yu-Lan (1953). A History of Chinese Philosophy. Vol. 2. Translated by Bodde, Derk. Princeton University Press. OCLC 277158434.
- The Book of Lieh-tzǔ: A Classic of Tao. Translated by Graham, A. C. New York: Columbia University Press. 1990 [1960]. ISBN 0-231-07237-6.
- Xunzi: A Translation and Study of the Complete Works. Translated by Knoblock, John. Stanford University Press. 1988. ISBN 0-8047-1451-7 – via Google Books.
- Mair, Victor H., ed. (1990), Tao Te Ching: The Classic Book of Integrity and the Way, New York: Bantam Books, ISBN 978-0-307-43463-0
- Mair, Victor H. (1994). Wandering on the Way: Early Taoist Tales and Parables of Chuang Tzu. New York: Bantam Books. ISBN 0-553-37406-0.
- Needham, Joseph (1978). Ronan, Colin A. (ed.). The Shorter Science and Civilisation in China. Vol. 1. Cambridge University Press. ISBN 0-521-21821-7.
- Robinet, Isabelle (2008). "Wuji and Taiji 無極 • 太極 Ultimateless and Great Ultimate". In Pregadio, Fabrizio (ed.). The Encyclopedia of Taoism. Abingdon: Routledge. pp. 1057–1059. ISBN 978-0-7007-1200-7.
- Zhang, Dainian (2002). Key Concepts in Chinese Philosophy. Translated by Ryden, Edmund. Yale University Press. ISBN 0-300-09210-5 – via Google Books.
