= Shang (bell) =

Tibetan ritual flat handbell

The shang (Wylie: gchang) is a Tibetan ritual upturned flat handbell employed by Bonpos and shamans.

== Description ==
Shang range in size from approximately three to 20 inches in diameter. They are traditionally believed to originate in Zhangzhung and are symbolically similar to the dril bu or ghanta.

Shangs are traditionally consecrated.

== Use ==
A shang consists of three principal parts: the flat bell part proper; the gankyil, which is the centre piece that holds the knocker; and the knocker or striker proper, which is often made of animal horn.

The shang was believed to be useful in receiving information from the Eastern concept of aether, to induce trance or call spirits. The shang is often used in rites in conjunction with the phurba and namkha.

== History and origins ==
Traditionally believed to have originated in the ancient kingdom of Zhangzhung, the shang is considered one of the oldest ritual instruments still used in Tibetan spiritual practice. Zhangzhung was a culturally rich region that preceded the widespread influence of Buddhism in Tibet and is closely linked to the origins of Bön. According to Bön mythology, the shang was introduced by Tonpa Shenrab, the legendary founder of the Bön religion, as a sacred implement for healing, protection, and spiritual communication.

== Design and components ==
Shangs typically range in size from about 3 inches (7.5 cm) to over 20 inches (50 cm) in diameter. Each consists of three main parts: the flat circular bell disc; the gankyil, a triple-spiral-shaped metal fitting that sits at the center and serves as the handle mount; and the striker or knocker, traditionally made from animal horn or hardwood. The gankyil, or "wheel of joy," is a recurring symbol in both Bön and Tibetan Buddhist iconography, representing the interdependence of all phenomena.

The bell itself is often forged from a consecrated alloy of sacred metals, combining bronze, copper, and other trace elements believed to enhance its spiritual efficacy. Many shangs are adorned with colorful cloths or symbolic beads tied to the handle, representing the five elements (earth, water, fire, air, and space).

== Ritual function ==
In ritual use, the shang is employed to summon protective spirits, cleanse ritual spaces, and guide meditative or trance states. Its resonant tone is believed to dispel negative energies and harmonize the practitioner's environment. Practitioners may also use the shang during initiations, divination ceremonies, and healing rituals.

The instrument is frequently used alongside other sacred ritual tools such as the phurba (ritual dagger) and namkha (woven cross symbolizing the elements and cosmos). In these contexts, the shang may act as a bridge between the physical and spiritual realms, aiding in communication with deities, elemental spirits, or ancestral forces.

== Construction and consecration ==
Crafting a shang involves not only skilled metalwork but also ritual consecration. The process may include chanting, blessings, and specific invocations to endow the bell with spiritual potency. Some shangs, especially ancient ones, are treated as relics and housed in temples or used exclusively by high-ranking religious figures.

== See also ==
- Ghanta
- Gankyil
- Phurba
- Namkha
- Bön

== Bibliography ==
- Jansen, Eva Rudy (1995). Singing bowls: a practical handbook of instruction and use. Diever, Holland: Binkey Kok Publications. ISBN 90-74597-01-7.
