= Xie Peiqi =

- Born: 1920; China
- Died: 2003 (aged 82–83)
- Style: Yin Style Baguazhang
- Teacher(s): Men Baozhen (門寶珍)

Other information
- Notable students: Liu Fang, He Jinbao

Dr. Xie Peiqi (1920–October 10, 2003) was the 4th member of the lineage of Yin Style Baguazhang (YSB), and the last person to know the entire system. He was succeeded in the art by his student, He Jinbao.

== History ==
Xie was born in Beijing, China, to a family of water sellers.

Xie learned Baguazhang from Men Baozhen (Chinese: 門寶珍), who was a student of Yin Fu. Xie started learning martial arts from Men at the age of 13 and would spend nearly 30 years with him. The student to whom Xie had taught the entire Yin Style Baguazhang system, Liu Fang, died unexpectedly in 1985. It was too late to train anyone in the entire system, but He Jinbao became Xie's successor.

== Ensuring the Continuance of Yin Style Baguazhang ==
Towards the end of his life, Xie worked with He Jinbao to document the entire Yin Style Baguazhang system in a series of instructional DVDs, in an effort to ensure the survival of the system. In addition, He Jinbao wrote a series of articles to help continue Yin Style Baguazhang. Although Xie knew no one individual could learn the entire system after Liu Fang died, he wanted to preserve it, so that parts of it would endure with many people worldwide. He eventually left the teaching of the martial arts aspect of Yin Style Baguazhang to He Jinbao, and taught the medicine and bodywork of the system himself.

== Web resources ==
- UK London Study Group
- Sweden Stockholm Study Group
- Germany Münster Study Group
- USA Vermont Study Group
- USA Northampton, MA, Study Group
- USA Ann Arbor, MI, Study Group
- USA Bellingham, WA, Study Group
- USA Knoxville, TN (Smoky Mountain) Study Group
- USA Irving, TX
