= Bagua =

Eight trigrams used in Taoist cosmology

Chinese name
- Chinese: 八卦
- Literal meaning: Eight trigrams
Transcriptions
Standard Mandarin
- Hanyu Pinyin: Bāguà
- Wade–Giles: Pa^{1} kua^{4}
Hakka
- Romanization: Pat-koa
Yue: Cantonese
- Yale Romanization: baat gwa
- Jyutping: baat3 gwaa3
Middle Chinese
- Middle Chinese: peat kweaH

Vietnamese name
- Vietnamese alphabet: Bát quái
- Chữ Hán: 八卦

Korean name
- Hangul: 팔괘
- Hanja: 八卦
Transcriptions
- Revised Romanization: Palgwae

Japanese name
- Kanji: 八卦
- Hiragana: はっけ
Transcriptions
- Romanization: Hakke

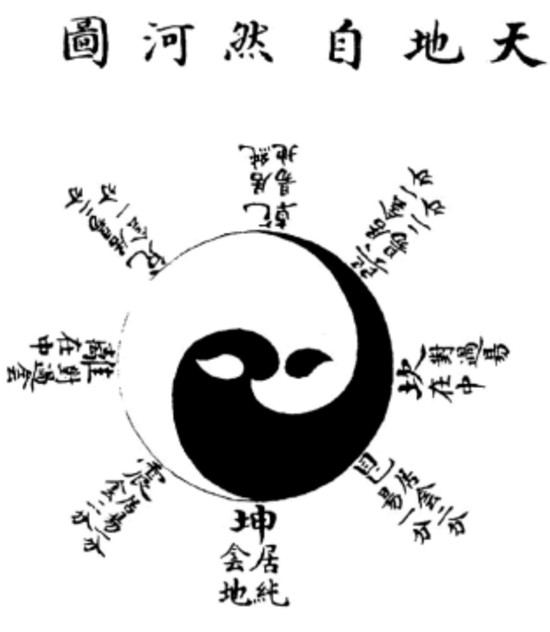
Bagua diagram explanation from Zhao Huiqian's 六書本義; Liùshū běnyì, 1370s

The bagua (Chinese: 八卦; pinyin: bāguà; lit. 'eight trigrams') is a set of symbols from China intended to illustrate the nature of reality as comprising mutually opposing forces reinforcing one another. Bagua is a group of trigrams—composed of three lines, each either "broken" or "unbroken", which represent yin and yang, respectively. Each line having two possible states allows for a total of 2^{3} = 8 trigrams, whose early enumeration and characterization in China has had an effect on the history of Chinese philosophy and cosmology.

The trigrams are related to the divination practice as described within the I Ching and practiced as part of the Shang and Zhou state religion, as well as with the concepts of taiji and the five elements within traditional Chinese metaphysics. The trigrams have correspondences in astronomy, divination, meditation, astrology, geography, geomancy (feng shui), anatomy, decorative arts, the family, martial arts (particularly tai chi and baguazhang), Chinese medicine and elsewhere.

The bagua can appear singly or in combination, and is commonly encountered in two different arrangements: the Primordial (先天八卦), "Earlier Heaven", or "Fuxi" bagua (伏羲八卦), which is so named according the legend of Fuxi being the first primordial being to identify the eight trigrams; and the Manifested (後天八卦), "Later Heaven", or "King Wen" bagua, which arose during recorded Chinese history.

In the I Ching, two trigrams are stacked together to create a six-line figure known as a hexagram. There are 64 possible permutations. The 64 hexagrams and their descriptions make up the book. The trigram symbolism can be used to interpret the hexagram figure and text. An example from Hexagram 19 commentary is "The earth above the lake: The image of Approach. Thus the superior man is inexhaustible in his will to teach, and without limits in his tolerance and protection of the people." The trigrams have been used to organize Yijing charts as seen below.

== Trigrams ==
There are eight possible combinations to render the various trigrams:

	Trigram figure	Possible binary value	Possible decimal sequential number	Name	Translation: Wilhelm	Image in nature (pp.l-li)	Phase	Later Heaven's Direction (p. 269)	Later Heaven's Equinox or Solstice	Earlier Heaven's Direction	Earlier Heaven's Equinox or Solstice	Family relationship (p. 274)	Body part (p. 274)	Attribute (p. 273)	Stage/ state (pp.l-li)	Animal (p. 273)	Obtained Images
1	☰	111	7	乾 qián	the Creative, '(natural) force'	heaven, sky 天	metal	northwest		south	Summer Solstice	father	head	strong, persisting	creative	馬 horse	三連 three lines
2	☱	110	6	兌 duì	the Joyous, 'open (reflection)'	lake, marsh 澤	metal	west	Fall Equinox	southeast		third daughter	mouth	pleasure	tranquil (complete devotion)	羊 sheep, goat	上缺 flawed above
3	☲	101	5	離 lí	the Clinging, 'radiance'	fire, glow 火	fire	south	Summer Solstice	east	Spring Equinox	second daughter	eye	light-giving, humane "dependence"	clinging, clarity, adaptable	雉 pheasant	中虛 hollow middle
4	☳	100	4	震 zhèn	the Arousing, 'shake'	thunder 雷	wood	east	Spring Equinox	northeast		first son	foot	inciting movement	initiative	龍 dragon	仰盂 face-up jar
5	☴	011	3	巽 xùn	the Gentle, 'ground'	wind, air 風	wood	southeast		southwest		first daughter	thigh	penetrating	gentle entrance	雞 fowl	下斷 broken below
6	☵	010	2	坎 kǎn	the Abyssal, 'gorge'	water 水	water	north	Winter Solstice	west	Fall Equinox	second son	ear	dangerous	in-motion	豕 pig	中滿 full middle
7	☶	001	1	艮 gèn	Keeping Still, bound	mountain 山	earth	northeast		northwest		third son	hand	resting, stand-still	completion	狗 dog	覆碗 face-down bowl
8	☷	000	0	坤 kūn	the Receptive, field	ground, earth 地	earth	southwest		north	Winter Solstice	mother	belly	devoted, yielding	receptive	牛 cow	六斷 six fragments

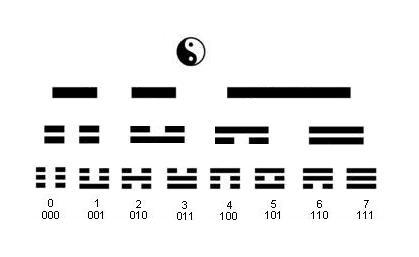
Alternative conversion of the trigrams to binary

== Relation to other principles ==
The Scripture of Changes 易经 (I Ching) listed two sources for the eight trigrams. Its chapter Xì Cí shàng; 'Great Treatise Beginning' explains the first source thus:

Original text

易有太極，
是生兩儀，
兩儀生四象，
四象生八卦。

Transliteration

Yì yǒu tàijí,
shì shēng liǎngyí,
liǎngyí shēng sìxiàng,
sìxiàng shēng bāguà.

English translation

Having change is the great-axis,
The great-axis produces the paired forces,
The paired forces produce the four aspects,
the four aspects produce the eight ways.

=== Tài Jí (太極) Great Axis ===
Taiji is the encapsulation of all the universe, space and time.

It is derived from Wújí 無極 (without axis) the formless, dimensionless, limitless, unbounded, infinite void.

When the formless void began to stir and move, Taiji came into being.

=== Liǎng Yí (兩儀) Dual Powers ===
The beginning of the universe begot the twin forces:

- ⚋ yīn (trad. 陰 / simp. 阴) dark, original, central, passive
- ⚊ yáng (trad. 陽 / simp. 阳) bright, extreme, furthest, active

=== Sì Xiàng (四像) Four Aspects ===
The twin powers produce four aspects named:

- ⚌ great yang 太陽 tàiyáng
- ⚎ lesser yang 少陽 shǎoyáng
- ⚍ lesser yin 少陰 shǎoyīn
- ⚏ great yin 太陰 tàiyīn

The four aspects are the differing levels of energy in world. Primarily they are associated with the solar terms, the two solstices and the two equinoxes. Being aspects they are also associated with the four main compass directions. Each direction is associated with a level of solar energy, and a mythological animal.

- ⚌ great yang 太陽 tàiyáng, Summer Solstice (longest day), South (most sun), Red Bird
- ⚎ lesser yang 少陽 shǎoyáng, Spring Equinox (increasing day), East (increasing sun), Blue Dragon
- ⚍ lesser yin 少陰 shǎoyīn, Fall Equinox (increasing night), West (decreasing sun), White Tiger
- ⚏ great yin 太陰 tàiyīn, Winter Solstice (longest night), North (least sun), Black Tortoise

=== Bā Guà (八卦) Eight Passages ===
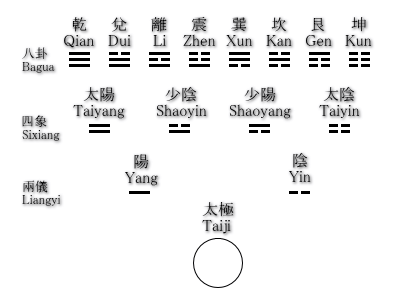
Derivation of the bagua

The four phenomena act through the eight gates (bā guà):

- ☰ Heaven 乾; Qián, warming
- ☳ Thunder 震; Zhèn, storming
- ☵ Water 坎; Kǎn, pooling
- ☶ Mountain 艮; Gèn, jutting
- ☴ Wind 巽; Xùn, dispersing
- ☲ Fire 離; Lí, dancing
- ☱ Lake/Marsh 兌; Duì, engulfing
- ☷ Earth 坤; Kūn, resting

Another chapter, 說卦; Shuō Guà; 'Discussing the Trigrams', characterizes the relationship of the trigrams as being:

- 乾; Qián ☰ Heaven, Father
- 坤; Kūn ☷ Earth, Mother

who have three sons:

- 震; Zhèn ☳ Thunder, 1st Son
- 坎; Kǎn, ☵ Water, 2nd Son
- 艮; Gèn ☶ Mountain, 3rd Son

and have three daughters:

- 巽; Xùn ☴ Wind, 1st Daughter
- 離; Lí ☲ Fire, 2nd Daughter
- 兌; Duì ☱ Lake, 3rd Daughter

The son trigrams all have a single ⚊ yáng line in their formation. The Yang trigrams correspond to odd numbers 1, 3, 5, 7.

The daughter trigrams all have a single ⚋ yīn line in their formation. The Yin trigrams correspond to even numbers 0, 2, 4, 6.

Their ordering is from bottom line, mid line, top line.

=== Wǔxíng (五行) Five Phases ===
The trigrams are related to the five phases of the Wuxing. The phases are: Water, Wood, Fire, Earth and Metal.

The major qualities associated with the 5 phases are:

- Water - Receding
- Fire - Bursting
- Earth - Resting
- Wood - Growing
- Metal - Contracting

These qualities are associated with the seasons.

- Water is associated with mid winter, the time of lowest energy.
- Fire is associated with mid summer, the time of highest energy.
- Earth is the pivot or balanced energy, either given as late summer, or as a brief transitional period between the seasons, where they are neither obviously one quality or the next.
- Wood is associated with the spring time, burst with life and increasing sunshine.
- Metal with the fall, life is slowing down, the days are shortening, and both men and creatures are taking precaution by storing food, and preparing for winter.

Typically the trigram-to-phase correspondences are given as follows:

- The phase of Water 水 only corresponds with the trigram of the Deep 坎; Kǎn.
- The phase of Fire 火 only corresponds with the trigram of Flame 離; Lí.
- The phase of Earth or Soil 土 corresponds with the trigrams of Earth 坤; Kūn and Mountain 艮; Gèn.
- The phase of Wood 木 corresponds with the trigrams of Wind 巽; Xùn and Thunder 震; Zhèn.
- The phase of Metal or Gold 金 corresponds with the trigrams of Heaven 乾; Qián and Lake 兌; Duì.

Notably, more than just their seasonal correspondence, the elements have interactions with each other and relationships of promoting and subverting other elements, as well as reversals where there is insufficiency in one element, resulting in an unbalanced relationship giving unexpected results where it should normally promote or subvert another element, but gives the opposite effect.

The wuxing and its promoting/subverting relationship system is also used as a frame work for understanding the relationships in spacial features in feng shui as well as the relationships between the organ systems in traditional Chinese medicine.

=== Liùshísì Guà (六十四卦) Sixty-Four Hexagrams ===
Eight trigrams stacked atop another eight trigrams give sixty-four variations of hexagrams, with the dominant quality above, and the secondary quality below. These sixty four hexagrams make up the main body of the Yijing oracle used for divination. The Yijing itself gives a pithy explanation for each hexagram.

The ways can be thought of as eight main expectations, and each variation is an outcome either typical, inverted; promoted, subverted; nurtured, neglected; surprised or disappointed; depending on circumstance. The sixty-four hexagrams give many possibilities for how an endeavor may turn out.

Diviners consulting the Yijing oracle use a variety of methods to elicit a response from the oracle, such as throwing yarrow stalks, tossing coins, pulling cards from a deck, or consulting exterior signs, such as examining the shapes of sacrificed animal entrails, examining the cracking patterns of bones tossed into a fire, observing the flight path of startled birds, etc.

==== Hexagram lookup table ====
Upper Lower	☰	☱	☲	☳	☴	☵	☶	☷
Upper Lower	乾(qián)	兌(duì)	離(lí)	震(zhèn)	巽(xùn)	坎(kǎn)	艮(gèn)	坤(kūn)
Upper Lower	Heaven	Lake	Flame	Thunder	Wind	Water	Mountain	Earth
☰	1	43	14	34	9	5	26	11
☰	䷀	䷪	䷍	䷡	䷈	䷄	䷙	䷊
乾(qián)	乾(qián)	夬(guài)	大有(dàyǒu)	大壯(dàzhuàng)	小畜(xiǎoxù)	需(xū)	大畜(dàxù)	泰(tài)
Heaven	Force	Displacement	Great Possessing	Great Invigorating	Small Harvest	Attending	Great Accumulating	Pervading
☱	10	58	38	54	61	60	41	19
☱	䷉	䷹	䷥	䷵	䷼	䷻	䷨	䷒
兌(duì)	履(lǚ)	兌(duì)	睽(kuí)	歸妹(guīmèi)	中孚(zhōngfú)	節(jié)	損(sǔn)	臨(lín)
Lake	Treading	Open	Polarising	Converting the Maiden	Inner Truth	Articulating	Diminishing	Nearing
☲	13	49	30	55	37	63	22	36
☲	䷌	䷰	䷝	䷶	䷤	䷾	䷕	䷣
離(lí)	同人(tóngrén)	革(gé)	離(lí)	豐(fēng)	家人(jiārén)	既濟(jìjì)	賁(bì)	明夷(míngyí)
Flame	Concording People	Skinning	Radiance	Abounding	Dwelling People	Already Fording	Adorning	Intelligence Hidden
☳	25	17	21	51	42	3	27	24
☳	䷘	䷐	䷔	䷲	䷩	䷂	䷚	䷗
震(zhèn)	无妄(wúwàng)	隨(suí)	噬嗑(shìhé)	震(zhèn)	益(yì)	屯(tún)	頤(yí)	復(fù)
Thunder	Innocence	Following	Gnawing Bite	Shake	Augmenting	Sprouting	Swallowing	Returning
☴	44	28	50	32	57	48	18	46
☴	䷫	䷛	䷱	䷟	䷸	䷯	䷑	䷭
巽(xùn)	姤(gòu)	大過(dàguò)	鼎(dǐng)	恆(héng)	巽(xùn)	井(jǐng)	蠱(gǔ)	升(shēng)
Wind	Coupling	Great Exceeding	Holding	Persevering	Ground	Welling	Correcting	Ascending
☵	6	47	64	40	59	29	4	7
☵	䷅	䷮	䷿	䷧	䷺	䷜	䷃	䷆
坎(kǎn)	訟(sòng)	困(kùn)	未濟(wèijì)	解(jiě)	渙(huàn)	坎(kǎn)	蒙(méng)	師(shī)
Water	Arguing	Confining	Before Completion	Deliverance	Dispersing	Gorge	Enveloping	Leading
☶	33	31	56	62	53	39	52	15
☶	䷠	䷞	䷷	䷽	䷴	䷦	䷳	䷎
艮(gèn)	遯(dùn)	咸(xián)	旅(lǚ)	小過(xiǎoguò)	漸(jiàn)	蹇(jiǎn)	艮(gèn)	謙(qiān)
Mountain	Retiring	Conjoining	Sojourning	Small Exceeding	Infiltrating	Limping	Bound	Humbling
☷	12	45	35	16	20	8	23	2
☷	䷋	䷬	䷢	䷏	䷓	䷇	䷖	䷁
坤(kūn)	否(pǐ)	萃(cuì)	晉(jìn)	豫(yù)	觀(guàn)	比(bǐ)	剝(bāo)	坤(kūn)
Earth	Obstruction	Clustering	Prospering	Providing-For	Viewing	Grouping	Stripping	Field

== Fuxi's "Earlier Heaven" vs King Wen's "Later Heaven" ==
Fuxi's "Earlier Heaven" bagua arrangement

King Wen "Later Heaven" bagua arrangement

Name	Nature	Personality	Family	Direction (Fu Xi)	Direction (Wenwang)	Solar term (Fu Xi)	Solar Term (Wenwang)
乾 Qián	Sky, Heaven	Creative	Father	South	Northwest	Summer Solstice	Beginning of Winter
兌 Duì	Lake	Joyous	3rd Daughter	Southeast	West	Beginning of Summer	Autumn Equinox
離 Lí	Fire	Clinging	2nd Daughter	East	South	Spring Equinox	Summer Solstice
震 Zhèn	Thunder	Arousing	1st Son	Northeast	East	Beginning of Spring	Spring Equinox
巽 Xùn	Wind	Gentle	1st Daughter	Southwest	Southeast	Beginning of Autumn	Beginning of Summer
坎 Kǎn	Water	Deep	2nd Son	West	North	Autumn Equinox	Winter Solstice
艮 Gèn	Mountain	Still	3rd Son	Northwest	Northeast	Beginning of Winter	Beginning of Spring
坤 Kūn	Earth	Receptive	Mother	North	Southwest	Winter Solstice	Beginning of Autumn

== In feng shui ==
The bagua is a tool in the majority of feng shui schools. The bagua used in feng shui can appear in two different versions: the Earlier Heaven bagua, used for burial sites, and the Later Heaven bagua, used for residences.

=== Pre-Natal Bagua ===
Primordial bagua is also known as Fuxi bagua or Earlier Heaven bagua. Named after the mythological first emperor of China. In the Preface of Shang Shu by Kong Anguo, he writes that "In ancient times, Fuxi ruled the whole world. It was he who began to draw Eight Trigrams and to create Scripts in order to substitute the system of tying knots." In traditional Chinese medicine, this sequence is known as the prenatal sequence and is used to understand familial risk for illness or disease. The Heaven trigram is at the top, the Earth trigram is at the bottom (the South was located at the top in Chinese maps of this period) of the bagua. The Fire trigram is located on the left, while the Water trigram is on the right. Thunder and wind form another pair, being the opposites of each other; the first is on the bottom left next to fire, while the second is next to Heaven on the top right of the bagua. Mountain and Lake form the last pair, with one opposite to the other. The adjustment of the trigrams is symmetrical by forming exact contrary pairs. They symbolize the opposite forces of Yin and Yang and represent a state in which everything is in balance.

=== Post-Natal Bagua ===
The sequence of trigrams in the Later Heaven bagua is attributed to King Wen. It is also known as the postnatal bagua arrangement in traditional Chinese medicine; it is used to understand physical, emotional and environmental patterns that influence health or disease. In this arrangement, Water is placed downwards and Fire at the top; Thunder is in the East, while Lake is in the West. Contrary to the Earlier Heaven bagua, the Later Heaven bagua is dynamic; energies and the aspects of each of its trigrams flow towards the following. It is the sequence used by the Luo Pan compass, which is used in feng shui and referred to as the manifest pattern; it analyzes the movement of the qi that practitioners believe affect them.

=== Bagua Mirror ===
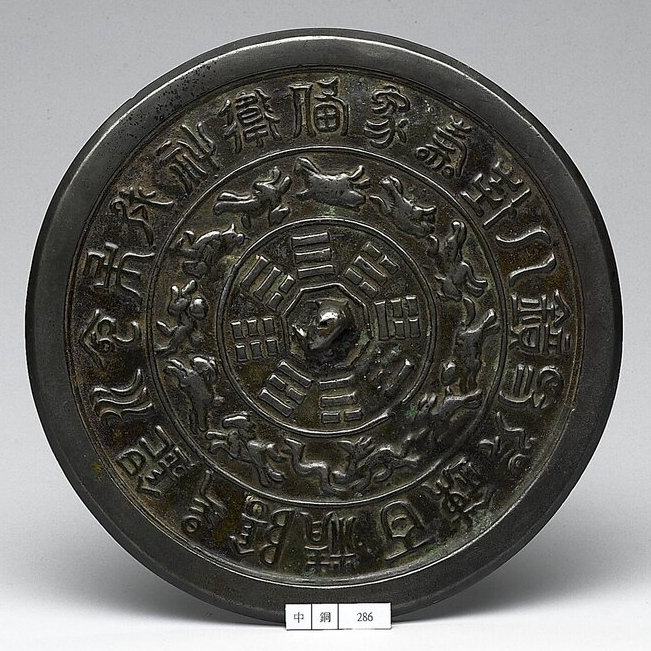
Cast bronze Bagua mirror with trigrams decor. Song dynasty, AD 960-1279.

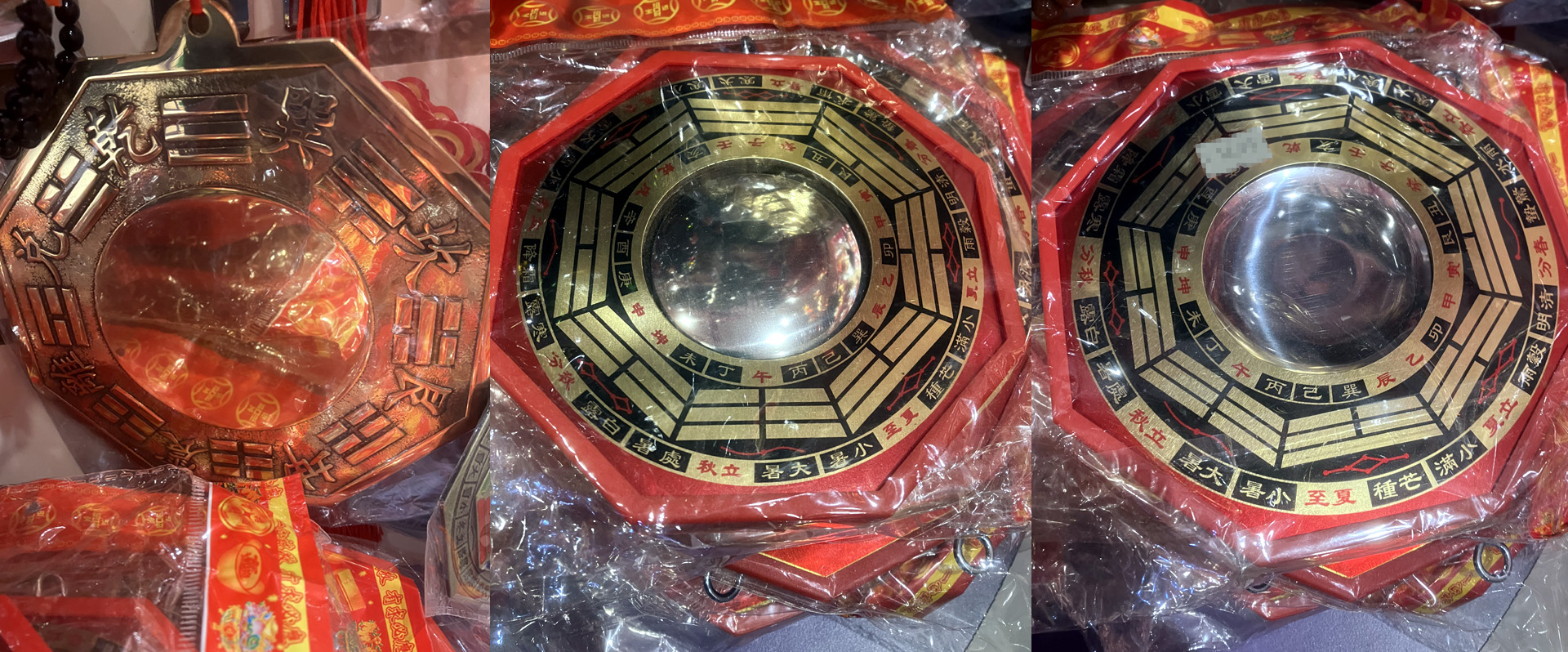
Three variants of modern Bagua mirror talismans sold at a shop. From left to right: Flat, Convex, Concave.

A Bagua Mirror (八卦鏡, sometimes transliterated as Pa Kua Mirror) is a feng shui talisman, typically octagonal or circular in shape, with a display of bagua trigrams around a circular mirror, which could be flat, convex or concave. Modern bagua mirrors are evolved from ancient bronze-cast versions used by taoist masters to perform powerful Mirror Techniques (鏡術) said to reveal or destroy evil spirits or even overcome natural calamities. Although a bagua mirror bears some resemblance to a loupan, it is not a feng shui instrument but a feng shui remedy that is believed to reflect (flat variant), disperse (convex variant) or converge/absorb (concave variant) external Sha Qi (煞氣) or poison-arrows and hence alter the feng shui conditions of a residence.

Bagua mirrors offer an inexpensive, often self-administered quick fix to certain feng shui concerns. For example, sharp corners of buildings or an open road leading to a house are considered sources of poison-arrows. When faced with such sources, people would sometimes install a bagua mirror above their front door or window to deflect the poison-arrows away from entering their residence. Since any reflected poison-arrows would supposedly be redirected towards the direction the mirror faces, pointing a bagua mirror towards a neighbor's residence is generally considered offensive and is a feng shui taboo. Unfortunately, the DIY nature makes them prone to misuse or abuse for personal vendetta against neighbors. Conflicts caused by offensive bagua mirror installations are well known in populous Chinese communities like Hong Kong and such feng shui mirror feuds have been parodied in popular culture.

=== Western bagua ===
The popularity of feng shui increased in the West because of the bagua of the eight aspirations. Each trigram corresponds to an aspect of life that also corresponds to one of the cardinal directions. Applying feng shui using the bagua of the eight aspirations (or bagua map for short) made it possible to simplify feng shui and to use it for the general public. Western bagua focuses more heavily on intention than the traditional forms of feng shui.

Experienced practicers of traditional feng shui disregard Western bagua for its simplicity, since it does not take into account the forms of the landscape, time, or the annual cycles. The bagua of the eight aspirations is divided into two branches: the first, which uses the compass and cardinal directions, and the second, which uses the bagua by using the main door.

==== Bagua map ====
A bagua map is a tool used in Western forms of feng shui to map a room or location and see how the different sections correspond to different aspects in one's life. These sections are believed to relate to every area or aspect of life and are divided into categories such as fame, relationships/marriage, children/creativity, helpful people/travel, career, inner knowledge, family/ancestors/health, and wealth/blessings.

In this system, the map is intended to be used over the land, one's home, office or desk to find areas lacking good chi, and to show where there are spaces that may need rectifying or enhancing in life or the environment.

For example, if the bagua grid is placed over an entire house plan and it shows the toilet, bathroom, laundry, or kitchen in the wealth/blessings area of the map, it would be said that the money coming into that particular environment would disappear very fast.

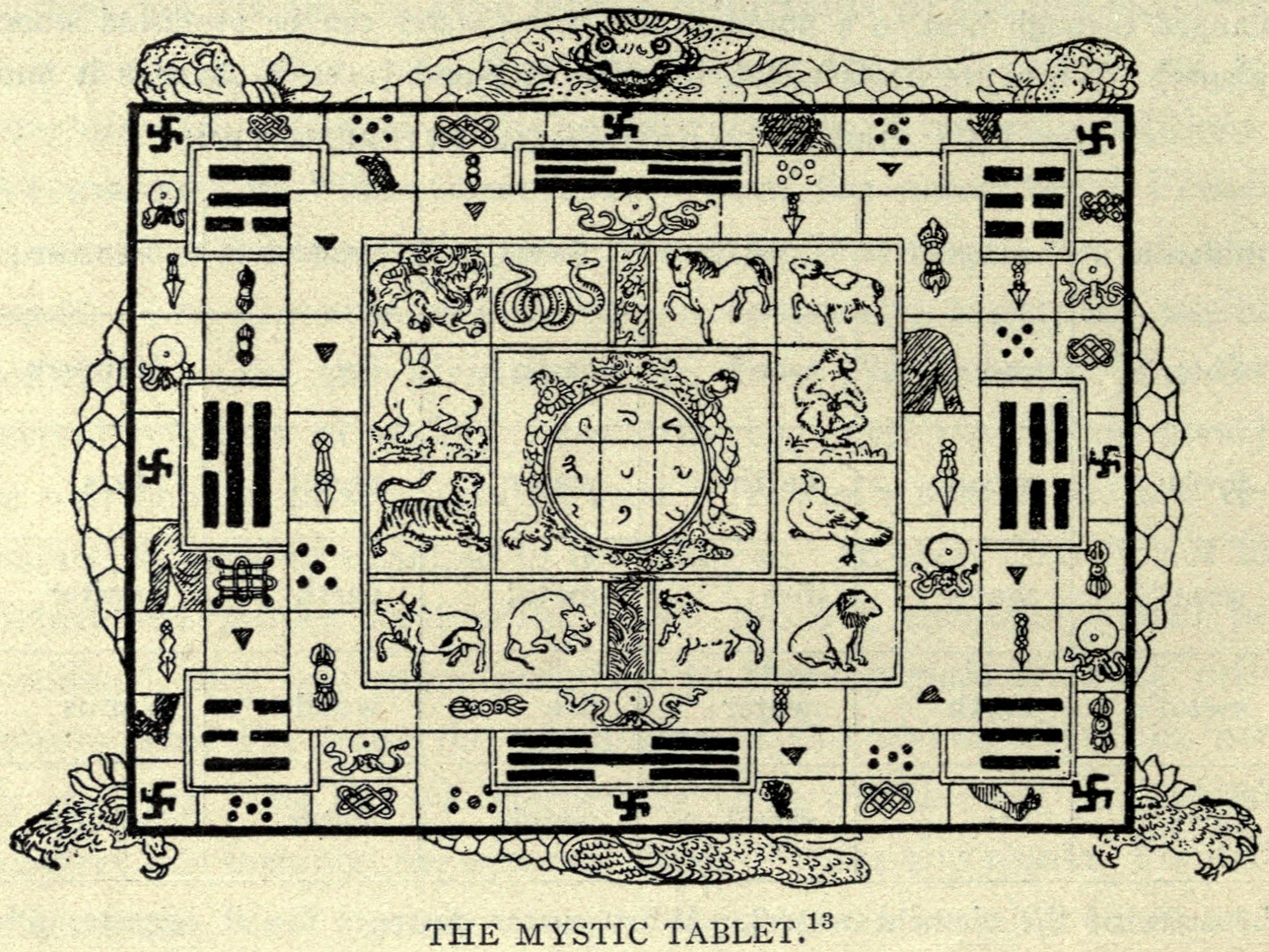
A Tibetan "Mystic Tablet" containing the Eight Trigrams on top of a large tortoise (presumably, alluding to the animal that presented them to Fuxi), along with the 12 signs of Chinese zodiac, and a smaller tortoise carrying the Lo Shu Square on its shell

== In Unicode ==
The bagua symbols in the Miscellaneous Symbols block of Unicode include the following:

Miscellaneous Symbols Unicode block
Official name	Glyph	Unicode #	HTML
Trigram for Heaven	☰	U+2630	&#9776;
Trigram for Lake	☱	U+2631	&#9777;
Trigram for Fire	☲	U+2632	&#9778;
Trigram for Thunder	☳	U+2633	&#9779;
Trigram for Wind	☴	U+2634	&#9780;
Trigram for Water	☵	U+2635	&#9781;
Trigram for Mountain	☶	U+2636	&#9782;
Trigram for Earth	☷	U+2637	&#9783;

The Miscellaneous Symbols block also encodes the constituents ⚊ (yang—U+268A, &#9866;) and ⚋ (yin—U+268B, &#9867;), as well as the digrams ⚌ (greater yang—U+268C, &#9868;), ⚍ (lesser yin—U+268D, &#9869;), ⚎ (lesser yang—U+268E, &#9870;), and ⚏ (greater yin—U+268F, &#9871;).

The hexagrams they form are separately encoded in the Yijing Hexagram Symbols Unicode block.

== Modern usage ==
In traditional Chinese medicine, including the profession of acupuncture, the Earlier Heaven and Later Heaven arrangements are used to understand the pathogenesis of disease or illness and to select treatment plans specifically related and tailored to a patient's constitution.

The flag of South Korea has the four cardinal trigrams (qian, kun, kan, li) surrounding the taegeuk, or taijitu. These are specific representations of the movement and harmony of yin and yang. These trigrams were also depicted on the commissioning pennant of the South Korean Navy.

== See also ==
- Tian gan and Di zhi: the archaic calendar system of East Asia.
- Baguazhen, a military tactical formation based on the bagua.
- Ba Xian, Eight Taoist Immortals
- Ba Mai
- Ba Duan Jin
- Chinese ritual mastery traditions
- Chinese spiritual world concepts
- Fuji (planchette writing)
- Fulu
- Octal
