= List of hexagrams of the I Ching =

This is a list of the 64 hexagrams of the I Ching, or Book of Changes, and their Unicode character codes.

The list is in King Wen order. (Cf. other hexagram sequences.)

I Ching hexagrams

01 ䷀	02 ䷁	03 ䷂	04 ䷃	05 ䷄	06 ䷅	07 ䷆	08 ䷇	09 ䷈	10 ䷉	11 ䷊	12 ䷋	13 ䷌	14 ䷍	15 ䷎	16 ䷏
17 ䷐	18 ䷑	19 ䷒	20 ䷓	21 ䷔	22 ䷕	23 ䷖	24 ䷗	25 ䷘	26 ䷙	27 ䷚	28 ䷛	29 ䷜	30 ䷝	31 ䷞	32 ䷟
33 ䷠	34 ䷡	35 ䷢	36 ䷣	37 ䷤	38 ䷥	39 ䷦	40 ䷧	41 ䷨	42 ䷩	43 ䷪	44 ䷫	45 ䷬	46 ䷭	47 ䷮	48 ䷯
49 ䷰	50 ䷱	51 ䷲	52 ䷳	53 ䷴	54 ䷵	55 ䷶	56 ䷷	57 ䷸	58 ䷹	59 ䷺	60 ䷻	61 ䷼	62 ䷽	63 ䷾	64 ䷿

== Hexagram 1 ==

Hexagram 1 is named 乾 (qián), "Force". Other variations include "the creative", "strong action", "the key", and "god". Its inner (lower) trigram is ☰ (乾 qián) force = (天) heaven, and its outer (upper) trigram is identical.

Character information
Preview	䷀	
Unicode name	HEXAGRAM FOR THE CREATIVE HEAVEN	
Encodings	decimal	hex
Unicode	19904	U+4DC0
UTF-8	228 183 128	E4 B7 80
Numeric character reference	&#19904;	&#x4DC0;

== Hexagram 2 ==

Hexagram 2 is named 坤 (kūn), "Field". Other variations include "the receptive", "acquiescence", and "the flow". Its inner (lower) trigram is ☷ (坤 kūn) field = (地) earth, and its outer (upper) trigram is identical.

Character information
Preview	䷁	
Unicode name	HEXAGRAM FOR THE RECEPTIVE EARTH	
Encodings	decimal	hex
Unicode	19905	U+4DC1
UTF-8	228 183 129	E4 B7 81
Numeric character reference	&#19905;	&#x4DC1;

== Hexagram 3 ==

Hexagram 3 is named 屯 (zhūn), "Sprouting". Other variations include "difficulty at the beginning", "gathering support", and "hoarding". The meaning of "屯" is collect, store up, stingy, and stationing troops. Its inner (lower) trigram is ☳ (震 zhèn) shake = (雷) thunder, and its outer (upper) trigram is ☵ (坎 kǎn) gorge = (水) water.

Character information
Preview	䷂	
Unicode name	HEXAGRAM FOR DIFFICULTY AT THE BEGINNING	
Encodings	decimal	hex
Unicode	19906	U+4DC2
UTF-8	228 183 130	E4 B7 82
Numeric character reference	&#19906;	&#x4DC2;

== Hexagram 4 ==

Hexagram 4 is named 蒙 (méng), "Enveloping". Other variations include "youthful folly", "the young shoot", and "discovering". Its inner (lower) trigram is ☵ (坎 kǎn) gorge = (水) water, and its outer (upper) trigram is ☶ (艮 gèn) bound = (山) mountain.

Character information
Preview	䷃	
Unicode name	HEXAGRAM FOR YOUTHFUL FOLLY	
Encodings	decimal	hex
Unicode	19907	U+4DC3
UTF-8	228 183 131	E4 B7 83
Numeric character reference	&#19907;	&#x4DC3;

== Hexagram 5 ==

Hexagram 5 is named 需 (xū), "Attending". Other variations include "waiting", "moistened", and "arriving". Its inner (lower) trigram is ☰ (乾 qián) force = (天) heaven, and its outer (upper) trigram is ☵ (坎 kǎn) gorge = (水) water.

Character information
Preview	䷄	
Unicode name	HEXAGRAM FOR WAITING	
Encodings	decimal	hex
Unicode	19908	U+4DC4
UTF-8	228 183 132	E4 B7 84
Numeric character reference	&#19908;	&#x4DC4;

== Hexagram 6 ==

Hexagram 6 is named 訟 (sòng), arguing, dispute, litigation, conflict and "lawsuit". Its inner (lower) trigram is ☵ (坎 kǎn) gorge = (水) water, and its outer (upper) trigram is ☰ (乾 qián) force = (天) heaven.

Character information
Preview	䷅	
Unicode name	HEXAGRAM FOR CONFLICT	
Encodings	decimal	hex
Unicode	19909	U+4DC5
UTF-8	228 183 133	E4 B7 85
Numeric character reference	&#19909;	&#x4DC5;

== Hexagram 7 ==

Hexagram 7 is named 師 (shī), "Leading". Other variations include "the army" and "the troops". Its inner (lower) trigram is ☵ (坎 kǎn) gorge = (水) water, and its outer (upper) trigram is ☷ (坤 kūn) field = (地) earth.

Character information
Preview	䷆	
Unicode name	HEXAGRAM FOR THE ARMY	
Encodings	decimal	hex
Unicode	19910	U+4DC6
UTF-8	228 183 134	E4 B7 86
Numeric character reference	&#19910;	&#x4DC6;

== Hexagram 8 ==

Hexagram 8 is named 比 (bǐ), "Grouping". Other variations include "holding together" and "alliance". Its inner (lower) trigram is ☷ (坤 kūn) field = (地) earth, and its outer (upper) trigram is ☵ (坎 kǎn) gorge = (水) water.

Character information
Preview	䷇	
Unicode name	HEXAGRAM FOR HOLDING TOGETHER	
Encodings	decimal	hex
Unicode	19911	U+4DC7
UTF-8	228 183 135	E4 B7 87
Numeric character reference	&#19911;	&#x4DC7;

== Hexagram 9 ==

Hexagram 9 is named 小畜 (xiǎo xù), "Small Accumulating", "domestication" "the taming power of the small", "small harvest", "minor restraint" and "small livestock". Its inner (lower) trigram is ☰ (乾 qián) force = (天) heaven, and its outer (upper) trigram is ☴ (巽 xùn) ground = (風) wind.

Character information
Preview	䷈	
Unicode name	HEXAGRAM FOR SMALL TAMING	
Encodings	decimal	hex
Unicode	19912	U+4DC8
UTF-8	228 183 136	E4 B7 88
Numeric character reference	&#19912;	&#x4DC8;

== Hexagram 10 ==

Hexagram 10 is named 履 (lǚ), "Treading". Other variations include "treading (conduct)" and "continuing". Its inner (lower) trigram is ☱ (兌 duì) open = (澤) swamp, and its outer (upper) trigram is ☰ (乾 qián) force = (天) heaven.

Character information
Preview	䷉	
Unicode name	HEXAGRAM FOR TREADING	
Encodings	decimal	hex
Unicode	19913	U+4DC9
UTF-8	228 183 137	E4 B7 89
Numeric character reference	&#19913;	&#x4DC9;

== Hexagram 11 ==

Hexagram 11 is named 泰 (tài), "Pervading", “smooth going", "peace" and "greatness". Its inner (lower) trigram is ☰ (乾 qián) force = (天) heaven, and its outer (upper) trigram is ☷ (坤 kūn) field = (地) earth.

Character information
Preview	䷊	
Unicode name	HEXAGRAM FOR PEACE	
Encodings	decimal	hex
Unicode	19914	U+4DCA
UTF-8	228 183 138	E4 B7 8A
Numeric character reference	&#19914;	&#x4DCA;

== Hexagram 12 ==

Hexagram 12 is named 否 (pǐ), "Obstruction". Other variations include "standstill (stagnation)" and "selfish persons". Its inner (lower) trigram is ☷ (坤 kūn) field = (地) earth, and its outer (upper) trigram is ☰ (乾 qián) force = (天) heaven.

Character information
Preview	䷋	
Unicode name	HEXAGRAM FOR STANDSTILL	
Encodings	decimal	hex
Unicode	19915	U+4DCB
UTF-8	228 183 139	E4 B7 8B
Numeric character reference	&#19915;	&#x4DCB;

== Hexagram 13 ==

Hexagram 13 is named 同人 (tóng rén), "Concording People". Other variations include "fellowship with men" and "gathering men". Its inner (lower) trigram is ☲ (離 lí) radiance = (火) fire, and its outer (upper) trigram is ☰ (乾 qián) force = (天) heaven.

Character information
Preview	䷌	
Unicode name	HEXAGRAM FOR FELLOWSHIP	
Encodings	decimal	hex
Unicode	19916	U+4DCC
UTF-8	228 183 140	E4 B7 8C
Numeric character reference	&#19916;	&#x4DCC;

== Hexagram 14 ==

Hexagram 14 is named 大有 (dà yǒu), "Great Possessing". Other variations include "possession in great measure" and "the great possession". Its inner (lower) trigram is ☰ (乾 qián) force = (天) heaven, and its outer (upper) trigram is ☲ (離 lí) radiance = (火) fire.

Character information
Preview	䷍	
Unicode name	HEXAGRAM FOR GREAT POSSESSION	
Encodings	decimal	hex
Unicode	19917	U+4DCD
UTF-8	228 183 141	E4 B7 8D
Numeric character reference	&#19917;	&#x4DCD;

== Hexagram 15 ==

Hexagram 15 is named 謙 (qiān), "Humbling". Other variations include "modesty". Its inner (lower) trigram is ☶ (艮 gèn) bound = (山) mountain, and its outer (upper) trigram is ☷ (坤 kūn) field = (地) earth.

Character information
Preview	䷎	
Unicode name	HEXAGRAM FOR MODESTY	
Encodings	decimal	hex
Unicode	19918	U+4DCE
UTF-8	228 183 142	E4 B7 8E
Numeric character reference	&#19918;	&#x4DCE;

== Hexagram 16 ==

Hexagram 16 is named 豫 (yù), "Providing-For". Other variations include "enthusiasm" and "excess". Its inner (lower) trigram is ☷ (坤 kūn) field = (地) earth, and its outer (upper) trigram is ☳ (震 zhèn) shake = (雷) thunder.

Character information
Preview	䷏	
Unicode name	HEXAGRAM FOR ENTHUSIASM	
Encodings	decimal	hex
Unicode	19919	U+4DCF
UTF-8	228 183 143	E4 B7 8F
Numeric character reference	&#19919;	&#x4DCF;

== Hexagram 17 ==

Hexagram 17 is named 隨 (suí), "Following", "Pursue", "Hunter". Its inner (lower) trigram is ☳ (震 zhèn) shake = (雷) thunder, and its outer (upper) trigram is ☱ (兌 duì) open = (澤) swamp.

Character information
Preview	䷐	
Unicode name	HEXAGRAM FOR FOLLOWING	
Encodings	decimal	hex
Unicode	19920	U+4DD0
UTF-8	228 183 144	E4 B7 90
Numeric character reference	&#19920;	&#x4DD0;

== Hexagram 18 ==

Hexagram 18 is named 蠱 (gǔ), "Correcting". Other variations include "work on what has been spoiled (decay)", "decaying" and "branch". Its inner (lower) trigram is ☴ (巽 xùn) ground = (風) wind, and its outer (upper) trigram is ☶ (艮 gèn) bound = (山) mountain. Gu is the name of a venom-based poison traditionally used in Chinese witchcraft.

Character information
Preview	䷑	
Unicode name	HEXAGRAM FOR WORK ON THE DECAYED	
Encodings	decimal	hex
Unicode	19921	U+4DD1
UTF-8	228 183 145	E4 B7 91
Numeric character reference	&#19921;	&#x4DD1;

== Hexagram 19 ==

Hexagram 19 is named 臨 (lín), "Nearing". Other variations include "approach" and "the forest". Its inner (lower) trigram is ☱ (兌 duì) open = (澤) swamp, and its outer (upper) trigram is ☷ (坤 kūn) field = (地) earth.

Character information
Preview	䷒	
Unicode name	HEXAGRAM FOR APPROACH	
Encodings	decimal	hex
Unicode	19922	U+4DD2
UTF-8	228 183 146	E4 B7 92
Numeric character reference	&#19922;	&#x4DD2;

== Hexagram 20 ==

Hexagram 20 is named 觀 (guān), "Viewing". Other variations include "contemplation (view)" and "looking up". Its inner (lower) trigram is ☷ (坤 kūn) field = (地) earth, and its outer (upper) trigram is ☴ (巽 xùn) ground = (風) wind.

Character information
Preview	䷓	
Unicode name	HEXAGRAM FOR CONTEMPLATION	
Encodings	decimal	hex
Unicode	19923	U+4DD3
UTF-8	228 183 147	E4 B7 93
Numeric character reference	&#19923;	&#x4DD3;

== Hexagram 21 ==

Hexagram 21 is named 噬嗑 (shì kè), "Gnawing Bite". Other variations include "biting through" and "biting and chewing". It may refer to teeth working together to bring coherence. Its inner (lower) trigram is ☳ (震 zhèn) shake = (雷) thunder, and its outer (upper) trigram is ☲ (離 lí) radiance = (火) fire.

Character information
Preview	䷔	
Unicode name	HEXAGRAM FOR BITING THROUGH	
Encodings	decimal	hex
Unicode	19924	U+4DD4
UTF-8	228 183 148	E4 B7 94
Numeric character reference	&#19924;	&#x4DD4;

== Hexagram 22 ==

Hexagram 22 is named 賁 (bì), "Adorning", "bright", "grace", "lush", and "luxuriance". Its inner (lower) trigram is ☲ (離 lí) radiance = (火) fire, and its outer (upper) trigram is ☶ (艮 gèn) bound = (山) mountain.

Character information
Preview	䷕	
Unicode name	HEXAGRAM FOR GRACE	
Encodings	decimal	hex
Unicode	19925	U+4DD5
UTF-8	228 183 149	E4 B7 95
Numeric character reference	&#19925;	&#x4DD5;

== Hexagram 23 ==

Hexagram 23 is named 剝 (bō), "Stripping". Other variations include "splitting apart", "flaying", "scalp", and "peel". This may allude to removal of something. Its inner (lower) trigram is ☷ (坤 kūn) field = (地) earth, and its outer (upper) trigram is ☶ (艮 gèn) bound = (山) mountain.

Character information
Preview	䷖	
Unicode name	HEXAGRAM FOR SPLITTING APART	
Encodings	decimal	hex
Unicode	19926	U+4DD6
UTF-8	228 183 150	E4 B7 96
Numeric character reference	&#19926;	&#x4DD6;

== Hexagram 24 ==

Hexagram 24 is named 復 (fù), "Returning". Other variations include "return (the turning point)". Its inner (lower) trigram is ☳ (震 zhèn) shake = (雷) thunder, and its outer (upper) trigram is ☷ (坤 kūn) field = (地) earth.

Character information
Preview	䷗	
Unicode name	HEXAGRAM FOR RETURN	
Encodings	decimal	hex
Unicode	19927	U+4DD7
UTF-8	228 183 151	E4 B7 97
Numeric character reference	&#19927;	&#x4DD7;

== Hexagram 25 ==

Hexagram 25 is named 无妄 (wú wàng), "Without Embroiling". Other variations include "innocence (the unexpected)" and "pestilence". Its inner (lower) trigram is ☳ (震 zhèn) shake = (雷) thunder, and its outer (upper) trigram is ☰ (乾 qián) force = (天) heaven.

Character information
Preview	䷘	
Unicode name	HEXAGRAM FOR INNOCENCE	
Encodings	decimal	hex
Unicode	19928	U+4DD8
UTF-8	228 183 152	E4 B7 98
Numeric character reference	&#19928;	&#x4DD8;

== Hexagram 26 ==

Hexagram 26 is named 大畜 (dà xù), "Great Accumulating". Other variations include "the taming power of the great", "great storage", and "potential energy". Its inner (lower) trigram is ☰ (乾 qián) force = (天) heaven, and its outer (upper) trigram is ☶ (艮 gèn) bound = (山) mountain.

Character information
Preview	䷙	
Unicode name	HEXAGRAM FOR GREAT TAMING	
Encodings	decimal	hex
Unicode	19929	U+4DD9
UTF-8	228 183 153	E4 B7 99
Numeric character reference	&#19929;	&#x4DD9;

== Hexagram 27 ==

Hexagram 27 is named 頤 (yí), "Swallowing". Other variations include "the corners of the mouth (providing nourishment)", "jaws" and "comfort/security". Its inner (lower) trigram is ☳ (震 zhèn) shake = (雷) thunder, and its outer (upper) trigram is ☶ (艮 gèn) bound = (山) mountain.

Character information
Preview	䷚	
Unicode name	HEXAGRAM FOR MOUTH CORNERS	
Encodings	decimal	hex
Unicode	19930	U+4DDA
UTF-8	228 183 154	E4 B7 9A
Numeric character reference	&#19930;	&#x4DDA;

== Hexagram 28 ==

Hexagram 28 is named 大過 (dà guò), "Great Exceeding". Other variations include "preponderance of the great", "great surpassing" and "critical mass". Its inner (lower) trigram is ☴ (巽 xùn) ground = (風) wind, and its outer (upper) trigram is ☱ (兌 duì) open = (澤) swamp.

Character information
Preview	䷛	
Unicode name	HEXAGRAM FOR GREAT PREPONDERANCE	
Encodings	decimal	hex
Unicode	19931	U+4DDB
UTF-8	228 183 155	E4 B7 9B
Numeric character reference	&#19931;	&#x4DDB;

== Hexagram 29 ==

Hexagram 29 is named 坎 (kǎn), "Gorge". Other variations include "the abyss" (in the oceanographic sense) and "repeated entrapment". Its inner (lower) trigram is ☵ (坎 kǎn) gorge = (水) water, and its outer (upper) trigram is identical.

Character information
Preview	䷜	
Unicode name	HEXAGRAM FOR THE ABYSMAL WATER	
Encodings	decimal	hex
Unicode	19932	U+4DDC
UTF-8	228 183 156	E4 B7 9C
Numeric character reference	&#19932;	&#x4DDC;

== Hexagram 30 ==

Hexagram 30 is named 離 (lí), "Radiance". Other variations include "the clinging, fire" and "the net". Its inner (lower) trigram is ☲ (離 lí) radiance = (火) fire, and its outer (upper) trigram is identical. The origin of the character has its roots in symbols of long-tailed birds such as the peacock or the legendary phoenix.

Character information
Preview	䷝	
Unicode name	HEXAGRAM FOR THE CLINGING FIRE	
Encodings	decimal	hex
Unicode	19933	U+4DDD
UTF-8	228 183 157	E4 B7 9D
Numeric character reference	&#19933;	&#x4DDD;

== Hexagram 31 ==

Hexagram 31 is named 咸 (xián), "Conjoining". Other variations include "influence (wooing)", "feelings", "being affected", and "reciprocity". Its inner (lower) trigram is ☶ (艮 gèn) bound = (山) mountain, and its outer (upper) trigram is ☱ (兌 duì) open = (澤) swamp.

Character information
Preview	䷞	
Unicode name	HEXAGRAM FOR INFLUENCE	
Encodings	decimal	hex
Unicode	19934	U+4DDE
UTF-8	228 183 158	E4 B7 9E
Numeric character reference	&#19934;	&#x4DDE;

== Hexagram 32 ==

Hexagram 32 is named 恆 (héng), "Persevering". Other variations include "duration" and "constancy". Its inner (lower) trigram is ☴ (巽 xùn) ground = (風) wind, and its outer (upper) trigram is ☳ (震 zhèn) shake = (雷) thunder.

Character information
Preview	䷟	
Unicode name	HEXAGRAM FOR DURATION	
Encodings	decimal	hex
Unicode	19935	U+4DDF
UTF-8	228 183 159	E4 B7 9F
Numeric character reference	&#19935;	&#x4DDF;

== Hexagram 33 ==

Hexagram 33 is named 遯 (dùn), "Retiring". Other variations include "retreat" and "yielding". Its inner (lower) trigram is ☶ (艮 gèn) bound = (山) mountain, and its outer (upper) trigram is ☰ (乾 qián) force = (天) heaven.

Character information
Preview	䷠	
Unicode name	HEXAGRAM FOR RETREAT	
Encodings	decimal	hex
Unicode	19936	U+4DE0
UTF-8	228 183 160	E4 B7 A0
Numeric character reference	&#19936;	&#x4DE0;

== Hexagram 34 ==

Hexagram 34 is named 大壯 (dà zhuàng), "Great Invigorating". Other variations include "the power of the great" and "great maturity". Its inner (lower) trigram is ☰ (乾 qián) force = (天) heaven, and its outer (upper) trigram is ☳ (震 zhèn) shake = (雷) thunder.

Character information
Preview	䷡	
Unicode name	HEXAGRAM FOR GREAT POWER	
Encodings	decimal	hex
Unicode	19937	U+4DE1
UTF-8	228 183 161	E4 B7 A1
Numeric character reference	&#19937;	&#x4DE1;

== Hexagram 35 ==

Hexagram 35 is named 晉 (jìn), "Prospering". Other variations include "progress" and "aquas". Its inner (lower) trigram is ☷ (坤 kūn) field = (地) earth, and its outer (upper) trigram is ☲ (離 lí) radiance = (火) fire.

Character information
Preview	䷢	
Unicode name	HEXAGRAM FOR PROGRESS	
Encodings	decimal	hex
Unicode	19938	U+4DE2
UTF-8	228 183 162	E4 B7 A2
Numeric character reference	&#19938;	&#x4DE2;

== Hexagram 36 ==

Hexagram 36 is named 明夷 (míng yí), "Darkening of the Light". Other variations include "brilliance injured" and "intelligence hidden". Its inner (lower) trigram is ☲ (離 lí) radiance = (火) fire, and its outer (upper) trigram is ☷ (坤 kūn) field = (地) earth.

Character information
Preview	䷣	
Unicode name	HEXAGRAM FOR DARKENING OF THE LIGHT	
Encodings	decimal	hex
Unicode	19939	U+4DE3
UTF-8	228 183 163	E4 B7 A3
Numeric character reference	&#19939;	&#x4DE3;

== Hexagram 37 ==

Hexagram 37 is named 家人 (jiā rén), "Dwelling People". Other variations include "the family (the clan)" and "family members". Its inner (lower) trigram is ☲ (離 lí) radiance = (火) fire, and its outer (upper) trigram is ☴ (巽 xùn) ground = (風) wind.

Character information
Preview	䷤	
Unicode name	HEXAGRAM FOR THE FAMILY	
Encodings	decimal	hex
Unicode	19940	U+4DE4
UTF-8	228 183 164	E4 B7 A4
Numeric character reference	&#19940;	&#x4DE4;

== Hexagram 38 ==

Hexagram 38 is named 睽 (kuí), "Polarising". Other variations include "opposition" and "perversion". The symbol 睽 also means separated, estranged, and stare. Its inner (lower) trigram is ☱ (兌 duì) open = (澤) swamp, and its outer (upper) trigram is ☲ (離 lí) radiance = (火) fire.

Character information
Preview	䷥	
Unicode name	HEXAGRAM FOR OPPOSITION	
Encodings	decimal	hex
Unicode	19941	U+4DE5
UTF-8	228 183 165	E4 B7 A5
Numeric character reference	&#19941;	&#x4DE5;

== Hexagram 39 ==

Hexagram 39 is named 蹇 (jiǎn), "Limping". Other variations include "obstruction" and "afoot". Its inner (lower) trigram is ☶ (艮 gèn) bound = (山) mountain, and its outer (upper) trigram is ☵ (坎 kǎn) gorge = (水) water.

Character information
Preview	䷦	
Unicode name	HEXAGRAM FOR OBSTRUCTION	
Encodings	decimal	hex
Unicode	19942	U+4DE6
UTF-8	228 183 166	E4 B7 A6
Numeric character reference	&#19942;	&#x4DE6;

== Hexagram 40 ==

Hexagram 40 is named 解 (jiě), "Taking-Apart". Other variations include "deliverance" and "untangled". Its inner (lower) trigram is ☵ (坎 kǎn) gorge = (水) water, and its outer (upper) trigram is ☳ (震 zhèn) shake = (雷) thunder.

Character information
Preview	䷧	
Unicode name	HEXAGRAM FOR DELIVERANCE	
Encodings	decimal	hex
Unicode	19943	U+4DE7
UTF-8	228 183 167	E4 B7 A7
Numeric character reference	&#19943;	&#x4DE7;

== Hexagram 41 ==
I ching 41- diminishing, 山泽损

Hexagram 41 is named 損 (sǔn), "Diminishing", "lose", "reduction", "remove", "damage", "decrease". Its inner (lower) trigram is ☱ (兌 duì) open = (澤) swamp, and its outer (upper) trigram is ☶ (艮 gèn) bound = (山) mountain.

Character information
Preview	䷨	
Unicode name	HEXAGRAM FOR DECREASE	
Encodings	decimal	hex
Unicode	19944	U+4DE8
UTF-8	228 183 168	E4 B7 A8
Numeric character reference	&#19944;	&#x4DE8;

== Hexagram 42 ==

Hexagram 42 is named 益 (yì), "Augmenting". Other variations include: increase, beneficial, useful. Its inner (lower) trigram is ☳ (震 zhèn) shake = (雷) thunder, and its outer (upper) trigram is ☴ (巽 xùn) ground = (風) wind.

Character information
Preview	䷩	
Unicode name	HEXAGRAM FOR INCREASE	
Encodings	decimal	hex
Unicode	19945	U+4DE9
UTF-8	228 183 169	E4 B7 A9
Numeric character reference	&#19945;	&#x4DE9;

== Hexagram 43 ==

Hexagram 43 is named 夬 (guài), "Displacement". Other variations include "resoluteness", "parting", and "break-through". Its inner (lower) trigram is ☰ (乾 qián) force = (天) heaven, and its outer (upper) trigram is ☱ (兌 duì) open = (澤) swamp.

Character information
Preview	䷪	
Unicode name	HEXAGRAM FOR BREAKTHROUGH	
Encodings	decimal	hex
Unicode	19946	U+4DEA
UTF-8	228 183 170	E4 B7 AA
Numeric character reference	&#19946;	&#x4DEA;

== Hexagram 44 ==

Hexagram 44 is named 姤 (gòu), "Coupling". Other variations include "coming to meet" and "meeting". Its inner (lower) trigram is ☴ (巽 xùn) ground = (風) wind, and its outer (upper) trigram is ☰ (乾 qián) force = (天) heaven.

Character information
Preview	䷫	
Unicode name	HEXAGRAM FOR COMING TO MEET	
Encodings	decimal	hex
Unicode	19947	U+4DEB
UTF-8	228 183 171	E4 B7 AB
Numeric character reference	&#19947;	&#x4DEB;

== Hexagram 45 ==

Hexagram 45 is named 萃 (cuì), "Clustering", "gathering together (massing)" and "finished". Other meanings of the symbol: gather, assemble, collect, dense, thick, and collection. It may mean that it's good to get help or advice; for progress it's necessary to persevere. The group needs to be sustained. Its inner (lower) trigram is ☷ (坤 kūn) field = (地) earth, and its outer (upper) trigram is ☱ (兌 duì) open = (澤) swamp.

Character information
Preview	䷬	
Unicode name	HEXAGRAM FOR GATHERING TOGETHER	
Encodings	decimal	hex
Unicode	19948	U+4DEC
UTF-8	228 183 172	E4 B7 AC
Numeric character reference	&#19948;	&#x4DEC;

== Hexagram 46 ==

Hexagram 46 is named 升 (shēng), "Ascending". Other variations include "pushing upward". Its inner (lower) trigram is ☴ (巽 xùn) ground = (風) wind, and its outer (upper) trigram is ☷ (坤 kūn) field = (地) earth.

Character information
Preview	䷭	
Unicode name	HEXAGRAM FOR PUSHING UPWARD	
Encodings	decimal	hex
Unicode	19949	U+4DED
UTF-8	228 183 173	E4 B7 AD
Numeric character reference	&#19949;	&#x4DED;

== Hexagram 47 ==

Hexagram 47 is named 困 (kùn), "Confining". Other variations include "oppression (exhaustion)" and "entangled". Its inner (lower) trigram is ☵ (坎 kǎn) gorge = (水) water, and its outer (upper) trigram is ☱ (兌 duì) open = (澤) swamp.

Character information
Preview	䷮	
Unicode name	HEXAGRAM FOR OPPRESSION	
Encodings	decimal	hex
Unicode	19950	U+4DEE
UTF-8	228 183 174	E4 B7 AE
Numeric character reference	&#19950;	&#x4DEE;

== Hexagram 48 ==

Hexagram 48 is named 井 (jǐng), "Welling". Other variations include "the well". Its inner (lower) trigram is ☴ (巽 xùn) ground = (風) wind, and its outer (upper) trigram is ☵ (坎 kǎn) gorge = (水) water.

Character information
Preview	䷯	
Unicode name	HEXAGRAM FOR THE WELL	
Encodings	decimal	hex
Unicode	19951	U+4DEF
UTF-8	228 183 175	E4 B7 AF
Numeric character reference	&#19951;	&#x4DEF;

== Hexagram 49 ==

Hexagram 49 is named 革 (gé), "Skinning". Other variations include "revolution (molting)" and "the bridle". Its inner (lower) trigram is ☲ (離 lí) radiance = (火) fire, and its outer (upper) trigram is ☱ (兌 duì) open = (澤) swamp.

Character information
Preview	䷰	
Unicode name	HEXAGRAM FOR REVOLUTION	
Encodings	decimal	hex
Unicode	19952	U+4DF0
UTF-8	228 183 176	E4 B7 B0
Numeric character reference	&#19952;	&#x4DF0;

== Hexagram 50 ==

Hexagram 50 is named 鼎 (dǐng), "Holding". Other variations include "the cauldron". Its inner (lower) trigram is ☴ (巽 xùn) ground = (風) wind, and its outer (upper) trigram is ☲ (離 lí) radiance = (火) fire.

Character information
Preview	䷱	
Unicode name	HEXAGRAM FOR THE CAULDRON	
Encodings	decimal	hex
Unicode	19953	U+4DF1
UTF-8	228 183 177	E4 B7 B1
Numeric character reference	&#19953;	&#x4DF1;

== Hexagram 51 ==

Hexagram 51 is named 震 (zhèn), "Shake","the arousing (shock, thunder)"; "thunder, excite, thrill, convulse, and tremor". The advice is to maintain one's concentration ("one did not lose the sacrificial wine in the ladle"). Its inner (lower) trigram is ☳ (震 zhèn) shake = (雷) thunder, and its outer (upper) trigram is identical.

Character information
Preview	䷲	
Unicode name	HEXAGRAM FOR THE AROUSING THUNDER	
Encodings	decimal	hex
Unicode	19954	U+4DF2
UTF-8	228 183 178	E4 B7 B2
Numeric character reference	&#19954;	&#x4DF2;

== Hexagram 52 ==

Hexagram 52 is named 艮 (gèn), "Bound". Other variations include "keeping still, mountain" and "stilling". The symbol also means, "blunt, tough, and chewy like hard leather". Its inner (lower) trigram is ☶ (艮 gèn) bound = (山) mountain, and its outer (upper) trigram is identical.

Character information
Preview	䷳	
Unicode name	HEXAGRAM FOR THE KEEPING STILL MOUNTAIN	
Encodings	decimal	hex
Unicode	19955	U+4DF3
UTF-8	228 183 179	E4 B7 B3
Numeric character reference	&#19955;	&#x4DF3;

== Hexagram 53 ==

Hexagram 53 is named 漸 (jiàn), "Infiltrating". Other variations include "development (gradual progress)" and "advancement". Its inner (lower) trigram is ☶ (艮 gèn) bound = (山) mountain, and its outer (upper) trigram is ☴ (巽 xùn) ground = (風) wind.

Character information
Preview	䷴	
Unicode name	HEXAGRAM FOR DEVELOPMENT	
Encodings	decimal	hex
Unicode	19956	U+4DF4
UTF-8	228 183 180	E4 B7 B4
Numeric character reference	&#19956;	&#x4DF4;

== Hexagram 54 ==

Hexagram 54 is named 歸妹 (guī mèi), "Converting the Maiden". Other variations include "the marrying maiden" and "returning maiden". Marrying younger sister. Not being in a position to make things happen one's own way. Trying to anyway will only bring trouble. Its inner (lower) trigram is ☱ (兌 duì) open = (澤) swamp, and its outer (upper) trigram is ☳ (震 zhèn) shake = (雷) thunder.

Character information
Preview	䷵	
Unicode name	HEXAGRAM FOR THE MARRYING MAIDEN	
Encodings	decimal	hex
Unicode	19957	U+4DF5
UTF-8	228 183 181	E4 B7 B5
Numeric character reference	&#19957;	&#x4DF5;

== Hexagram 55 ==

Hexagram 55 is named 豐 (fēng), "Abounding". Other variations include "abundance" and "fullness". Its inner (lower) trigram is ☲ (離 lí) radiance = (火) fire, and its outer (upper) trigram is ☳ (震 zhèn) shake = (雷) thunder.

Character information
Preview	䷶	
Unicode name	HEXAGRAM FOR ABUNDANCE	
Encodings	decimal	hex
Unicode	19958	U+4DF6
UTF-8	228 183 182	E4 B7 B6
Numeric character reference	&#19958;	&#x4DF6;

== Hexagram 56 ==

Hexagram 56 is named 旅 (lǚ), "Sojourning". Other variations include "the wanderer" and "traveling". Its inner (lower) trigram is ☶ (艮 gèn) bound = (山) mountain, and its outer (upper) trigram is ☲ (離 lí) radiance = (火) fire.

Character information
Preview	䷷	
Unicode name	HEXAGRAM FOR THE WANDERER	
Encodings	decimal	hex
Unicode	19959	U+4DF7
UTF-8	228 183 183	E4 B7 B7
Numeric character reference	&#19959;	&#x4DF7;

== Hexagram 57 ==

Hexagram 57 is named 巽 (xùn), "Ground". Other variations include "the gentle (the penetrating, wind)" and "calculations". Its inner (lower) trigram is ☴ (巽 xùn) ground = (風) wind, and its outer (upper) trigram is identical.

Character information
Preview	䷸	
Unicode name	HEXAGRAM FOR THE GENTLE WIND	
Encodings	decimal	hex
Unicode	19960	U+4DF8
UTF-8	228 183 184	E4 B7 B8
Numeric character reference	&#19960;	&#x4DF8;

== Hexagram 58 ==

Hexagram 58 is named 兌 (duì), "Open", "exchange" "the joyous, lake" and "usurpation". The symbol "兌" means exchange, add, against, and convert. Its inner (lower) trigram is ☱ (兌 duì) open = (澤) swamp, and its outer (upper) trigram is identical.

Character information
Preview	䷹	
Unicode name	HEXAGRAM FOR THE JOYOUS LAKE	
Encodings	decimal	hex
Unicode	19961	U+4DF9
UTF-8	228 183 185	E4 B7 B9
Numeric character reference	&#19961;	&#x4DF9;

== Hexagram 59 ==

Hexagram 59 is named 渙 (huàn), "Dispersing". Other variations include "dispersion (dissolution)" and "dispersal". The symbol means dissipate, dissolve, vanish. Its inner (lower) trigram is ☵ (坎 kǎn) gorge = (水) water, and its outer (upper) trigram is ☴ (巽 xùn) ground = (風) wind.

Character information
Preview	䷺	
Unicode name	HEXAGRAM FOR DISPERSION	
Encodings	decimal	hex
Unicode	19962	U+4DFA
UTF-8	228 183 186	E4 B7 BA
Numeric character reference	&#19962;	&#x4DFA;

== Hexagram 60 ==

Hexagram 60 is named 節 (jié), "Articulating". Other variations include "limitation" and "moderation". Its inner (lower) trigram is ☱ (兌 duì) open = (澤) swamp, and its outer (upper) trigram is ☵ (坎 kǎn) gorge = (水) water.

Character information
Preview	䷻	
Unicode name	HEXAGRAM FOR LIMITATION	
Encodings	decimal	hex
Unicode	19963	U+4DFB
UTF-8	228 183 187	E4 B7 BB
Numeric character reference	&#19963;	&#x4DFB;

== Hexagram 61 ==

Hexagram 61 is named 中孚 (zhōng fú), "Center Returning", "inner trust", "inner truth" and "central return". Its inner (lower) trigram is ☱ (兌 duì) open = (澤) swamp, and its outer (upper) trigram is ☴ (巽 xùn) ground = (風) wind.

Character information
Preview	䷼	
Unicode name	HEXAGRAM FOR INNER TRUTH	
Encodings	decimal	hex
Unicode	19964	U+4DFC
UTF-8	228 183 188	E4 B7 BC
Numeric character reference	&#19964;	&#x4DFC;

== Hexagram 62 ==

Hexagram 62 is named 小過 (xiǎo guò). Often called "Small Exceeding", "preponderance of the small" and "small surpassing", but literal translation of 小過 is: small mistake, slightly too much. Its inner (lower) trigram is ☶ (艮 gèn) bound = (山) mountain, and its outer (upper) trigram is ☳ (震 zhèn) shake = (雷) thunder.

Character information
Preview	䷽	
Unicode name	HEXAGRAM FOR SMALL PREPONDERANCE	
Encodings	decimal	hex
Unicode	19965	U+4DFD
UTF-8	228 183 189	E4 B7 BD
Numeric character reference	&#19965;	&#x4DFD;

== Hexagram 63 ==

Hexagram 63 is named 既濟 (jì jì), "Already Fording". Other variations include "after completion" and "already completed" or "already done". Its inner (lower) trigram is ☲ (離 lí) radiance = (火) fire, and its outer (upper) trigram is ☵ (坎 kǎn) gorge = (水) water.

Character information
Preview	䷾	
Unicode name	HEXAGRAM FOR AFTER COMPLETION	
Encodings	decimal	hex
Unicode	19966	U+4DFE
UTF-8	228 183 190	E4 B7 BE
Numeric character reference	&#19966;	&#x4DFE;

== Hexagram 64 ==

Hexagram 64 is named 未濟 (wèi jì), "Not Yet Fording". Other variations include "before completion" and "not yet completed". Its inner (lower) trigram is ☵ (坎 kǎn) gorge = (水) water, and its outer (upper) trigram is ☲ (離 lí) radiance = (火) fire.

Character information
Preview	䷿	
Unicode name	HEXAGRAM FOR BEFORE COMPLETION	
Encodings	decimal	hex
Unicode	19967	U+4DFF
UTF-8	228 183 191	E4 B7 BF
Numeric character reference	&#19967;	&#x4DFF;
