= Gao Heng (philologist) =

- Chinese: 高亨
Transcriptions
Standard Mandarin
- Hanyu Pinyin: Gāo Hēng
- Wade–Giles: Kao^{1} Hêng^{1}
- IPA: [káʊ xə́ŋ]

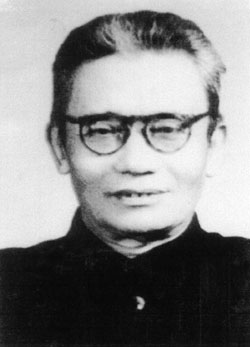
Gao Heng

Gao Heng (Chinese: 高亨, July 29, 1900 – February 2, 1986) was a Chinese philologist and palaeographer, known for his work on the modern interpretation of the I Ching. Among his most important accomplishments, he published a new translation of the ancient political treatise of Lord Shang with an original commentary in the (tumultuous) context of the 1970s.

Gao Heng was born in Shuangyang County, Jilin Province. In 1953, Gao joined the faculty of Shandong University as a professor. From 1957 onwards, he was also a part-time fellow of the Institute of Philosophy in the Chinese Academy of Sciences. In 1967, he transferred to Beijing and specialized in ancient and classical literature research.
