= Radical 182 =

Chinese character radical

風
- Radical 182 (U+2FB5)
- 風 (U+98A8) "wind"

Pronunciations
- Pinyin: fēng
- Bopomofo: ㄈㄥ
- Wade–Giles: feng1
- Cantonese Yale: fung1
- Jyutping: fung¹, fung³
- Japanese Kana: フウ fū / フ fu (on'yomi) かぜ kaze (kun'yomi)
- Sino-Korean: 풍 pung
- Hán-Việt: phong, phông

Names
- Japanese name(s): 風/かぜ kaze
- Hangul: 바람 baram

Stroke order animation

Stroke order of the simplified form 风

Radical 182 or radical wind (風部) meaning "wind" is one of the 11 Kangxi radicals (214 radicals in total) composed of 9 strokes.

In the Kangxi Dictionary, there are 182 characters (out of 49,030) to be found under this radical.

In Taoist cosmology, 風 (wind) is the nature component of the Bagua diagram 巽 Xùn.

风, the simplified form of 風, is the 91st indexing component in the Table of Indexing Chinese Character Components predominantly adopted by Simplified Chinese dictionaries published in mainland China, while the traditional form 風 is listed as its associated indexing component.

== Evolution ==
Loangraph of 鳳; 鳥 simplified to 虫.

Shang dynasty Oracle bone script (鳳)

Western Zhou Bronze script (鳳)

Western Zhou Bronze script (風)

Chu slip and silk script (風)

Qin slip script (風)

Shouwen ancient script (鳳)

Shouwen ancient script (風)

Large seal script character (風)

Small seal script (鳳)

Small seal script (風)

== Derived characters ==
Strokes	Characters (風)	Characters (风)
+0	風	风^{SC} (=風)
+3	颩 颪^{JP}	飏^{SC} (=颺)
+4	颫 颬	
+5	颭 颮 颯 颰 颱	飐^{SC} (=颭) 飑^{SC} (=颮) 飒^{SC} (=颯)
+6	颲 颳	
+7	颴 颵	
+8	颶 颷 (=飆)	飓^{SC} (=颶)
+9	颸 颹 颺	飔^{SC} (=颸) 飖^{SC} (=颻)
+10	颻 颼 颽 颾 颿 飀	飕^{SC} (=颼) 飗^{SC} (=飀)
+11	飁 飂 飃 (=飄) 飄	飘^{SC} (=飄)
+12	飅 飆 飇 (=飆) 飈 (=飆) 飉 飊 (=飆)	飙^{SC} (=飆) 飚^{SC nonstandard} (=飈=飆)
+13	飋	
+18	飌 (=風) 飍	

== Variant forms ==
In the Kangxi Dictionary and modern standard Traditional Chinese as used in Taiwan, Hong Kong, and Macau, the stroke above 虫 in the radical character 風 is horizontal, while it is a left-falling stroke in other languages.

Kangxi Dictionary Trad. Chinese (TW, HK, MO)	Japanese Korean Trad. Chinese (Mainland China)	Simp. Chinese
風	風	风

== Sinogram ==
The radical is also used as an independent Chinese character. It is one of the kyōiku kanji or kanji taught in elementary school in Japan. It is a second grade kanji.

== Literature ==
- Fazzioli, Edoardo (1987). Chinese calligraphy : from pictograph to ideogram : the history of 214 essential Chinese/Japanese characters. calligraphy by Rebecca Hon Ko. New York: Abbeville Press. ISBN 0-89659-774-1.
- Lunde, Ken (Jan 5, 2009). "Appendix J: Japanese Character Sets" (PDF). CJKV Information Processing: Chinese, Japanese, Korean & Vietnamese Computing (Second ed.). Sebastopol, Calif.: O'Reilly Media. ISBN 978-0-596-51447-1.
