= Hexagram (I Ching) =

Six stacked horizontal lines used in Chinese divination

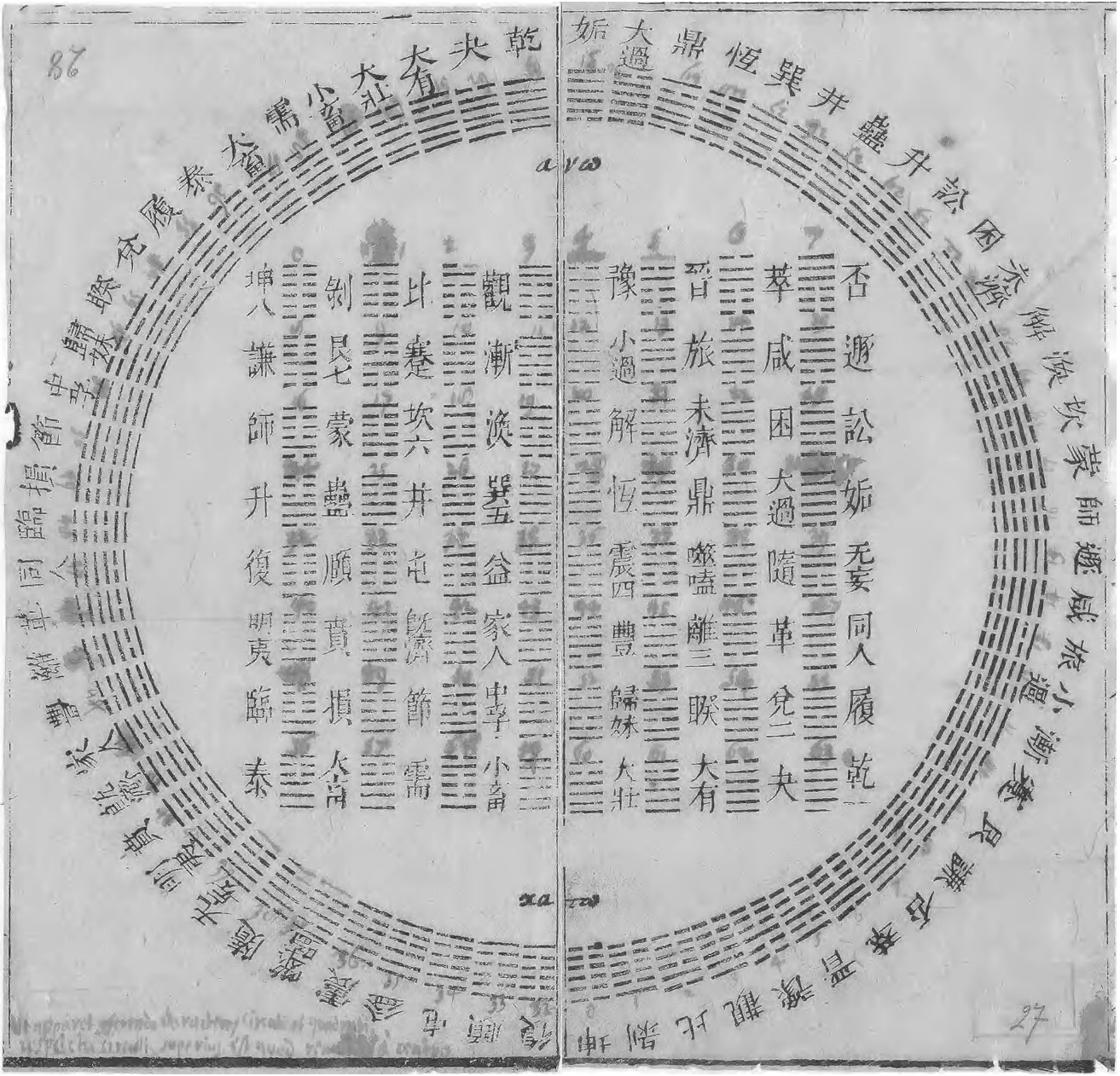
The hexagrams of the I Ching in a diagram belonging to the German mathematician philosopher Gottfried Wilhelm Leibniz

The I Ching book consists of 64 hexagrams. A hexagram in this context is a figure composed of six stacked horizontal lines (爻 yáo), where each line is either Yang (an unbroken, or solid line) or Yin (broken, an open line with a gap in the center). The hexagram lines are traditionally counted from the bottom up, so the lowest line is considered line one, while the top line is line six. Hexagrams are formed by combining the original eight trigrams in different combinations. Each hexagram is accompanied with a description, often cryptic, akin to parables. Each line in every hexagram is also given a similar description.

The Chinese word for a hexagram is 卦 "guà", although that also means trigram.

== Types ==
Hexagram numbers, in King Wen sequence

Classic and modern I Ching commentaries mention a number of different hexagram types:

- Eight Trigrams
- Original Hexagram
- Future Hexagram
- Contrasting (Reverse) Hexagram (is found by turning a hexagram upside down)
- Complementary Hexagram (is found by changing all the lines into their opposite)
- Hexagram of Sequence
- Nuclear (Mutual) Hexagram (hù guà) (is found by taking the inner lines of a hexagram; given that the original hexagram's lines are labeled 1 through 6 from bottom up, the nuclear hexagram contains the lines 2, 3, 4, 3, 4, 5)
- Hexagram of Change (biàn guà)
- Internal Hexagram (nèi guà)
- External Hexagram (wài guà)

== Sequences ==
The most commonly known sequence is the King Wen sequence. A totally different sequence was found in the Mawangdui Silk Texts. The hexagrams are also found in the Binary sequence, also known as Fu Xi sequence or Shao Yong sequence.

== Lookup table ==
Upper → Lower ↓	☰	☱	☲	☳	☴	☵	☶	☷
Upper → Lower ↓	乾(qián)	兌(duì)	離(lí)	震(zhèn)	巽(xùn)	坎(kǎn)	艮(gèn)	坤(kūn)
Upper → Lower ↓	Heaven	Lake	Flame	Thunder	Wind	Water	Mountain	Earth
☰	1	43	14	34	9	5	26	11
☰	䷀	䷪	䷍	䷡	䷈	䷄	䷙	䷊
乾(qián)	乾(qián)	夬(guài)	大有(dàyǒu)	大壯(dàzhuàng)	小畜(xiǎoxù)	需(xū)	大畜(dàchù)	泰(tài)
Heaven	Force	Displacement	Great Possessing	Great Invigorating	Small Harvest	Attending	Great Accumulating	Pervading
☱	10	58	38	54	61	60	41	19
☱	䷉	䷹	䷥	䷵	䷼	䷻	䷨	䷒
兌(duì)	履(lǚ)	兌(duì)	睽(kuí)	歸妹(guīmèi)	中孚(zhōngfú)	節(jié)	損(sǔn)	臨(lín)
Lake	Treading	Open	Polarising	Converting the Maiden	Inner Truth	Articulating	Diminishing	Nearing
☲	13	49	30	55	37	63	22	36
☲	䷌	䷰	䷝	䷶	䷤	䷾	䷕	䷣
離(lí)	同人(tóngrén)	革(gé)	離(lí)	豐(fēng)	家人(jiārén)	既濟(jìjì)	賁(bì)	明夷(míngyí)
Flame	Concording People	Skinning	Radiance	Abounding	Dwelling People	Already Fording	Adorning	Intelligence Hidden
☳	25	17	21	51	42	3	27	24
☳	䷘	䷐	䷔	䷲	䷩	䷂	䷚	䷗
震(zhèn)	无妄(wúwàng)	隨(suí)	噬嗑(shìhé)	震(zhèn)	益(yì)	屯(zhūn)	頤(yí)	復(fù)
Thunder	Innocence	Following	Gnawing Bite	Shake	Augmenting	Sprouting	Swallowing	Returning
☴	44	28	50	32	57	48	18	46
☴	䷫	䷛	䷱	䷟	䷸	䷯	䷑	䷭
巽(xùn)	姤(gòu)	大過(dàguò)	鼎(dǐng)	恆(héng)	巽(xùn)	井(jǐng)	蠱(gǔ)	升(shēng)
Wind	Coupling	Great Exceeding	Holding	Persevering	Ground	Welling	Correcting	Ascending
☵	6	47	64	40	59	29	4	7
☵	䷅	䷮	䷿	䷧	䷺	䷜	䷃	䷆
坎(kǎn)	訟(sòng)	困(kùn)	未濟(wèijì)	解(jiě)	渙(huàn)	坎(kǎn)	蒙(méng)	師(shī)
Water	Arguing	Confining	Before Completion	Deliverance	Dispersing	Gorge	Enveloping	Leading
☶	33	31	56	62	53	39	52	15
☶	䷠	䷞	䷷	䷽	䷴	䷦	䷳	䷎
艮(gèn)	遯(dùn)	咸(xián)	旅(lǚ)	小過(xiǎoguò)	漸(jiàn)	蹇(jiǎn)	艮(gèn)	謙(qiān)
Mountain	Retiring	Conjoining	Sojourning	Small Exceeding	Infiltrating	Limping	Bound	Humbling
☷	12	45	35	16	20	8	23	2
☷	䷋	䷬	䷢	䷏	䷓	䷇	䷖	䷁
坤(kūn)	否(pǐ)	萃(cuì)	晉(jìn)	豫(yù)	觀(guàn)	比(bǐ)	剝(bāo)	坤(kūn)
Earth	Obstruction	Clustering	Prospering	Providing-For	Viewing	Grouping	Stripping	Field

== See also ==
- Binary numbers
- Feng shui
- List of hexagrams of the I Ching
- Tai Yi Shen Shu
- Tie Ban Shen Shu
