= Shouwen =

9th-century CE Buddhist monk

Shǒuwēn (Chinese: 守温) was a 9th-century Buddhist Chinese monk credited with the invention of the analysis of Middle Chinese as having 36 initials, later ubiquitously used by the rime tables. However, the Dunhuang fragment Pelliot chinois 2012, held at the Bibliothèque Nationale de France, which operates using an earlier tradition of 30 initials, credits him as his author. Pulleyblank, noting that this fragment does recognize a distinction between labial stops and labiodental fricatives despite not enumerating the latter among the 30 initials, suspects that Shǒuwēn out of deference to the Qieyun tradition decided not to list these initials although he clearly recognized them.

== Sources ==
- Coblin, W. South (2006). "Reflections on the Shouwen fragments". In Branner, David Prager (ed.). The Chinese rime tables: linguistic philosophy and historical-comparative phonology. John Benjamins. pp. 99–122.
