= Lion (heraldry) =

Element in heraldry

Lion as a crest.

Lion as a primary charge in the coat of arms of Finland (1978 design, based on the 16th-century coat of arms of the Grand Duke of Finland).

The lion is a common charge in heraldry. It traditionally symbolises courage, nobility, royalty, strength, stateliness and valour, because historically the lion has been regarded as the "king of beasts". The lion also carries Catholic symbolism. The Lion of Judah stands in the coat of arms of Jerusalem. Similar-looking lions can be found elsewhere, such as in the coat of arms of the Swedish royal House of Bjälbo, from there in turn derived into the coat of arms of Finland, formerly belonging to Sweden.

== History ==
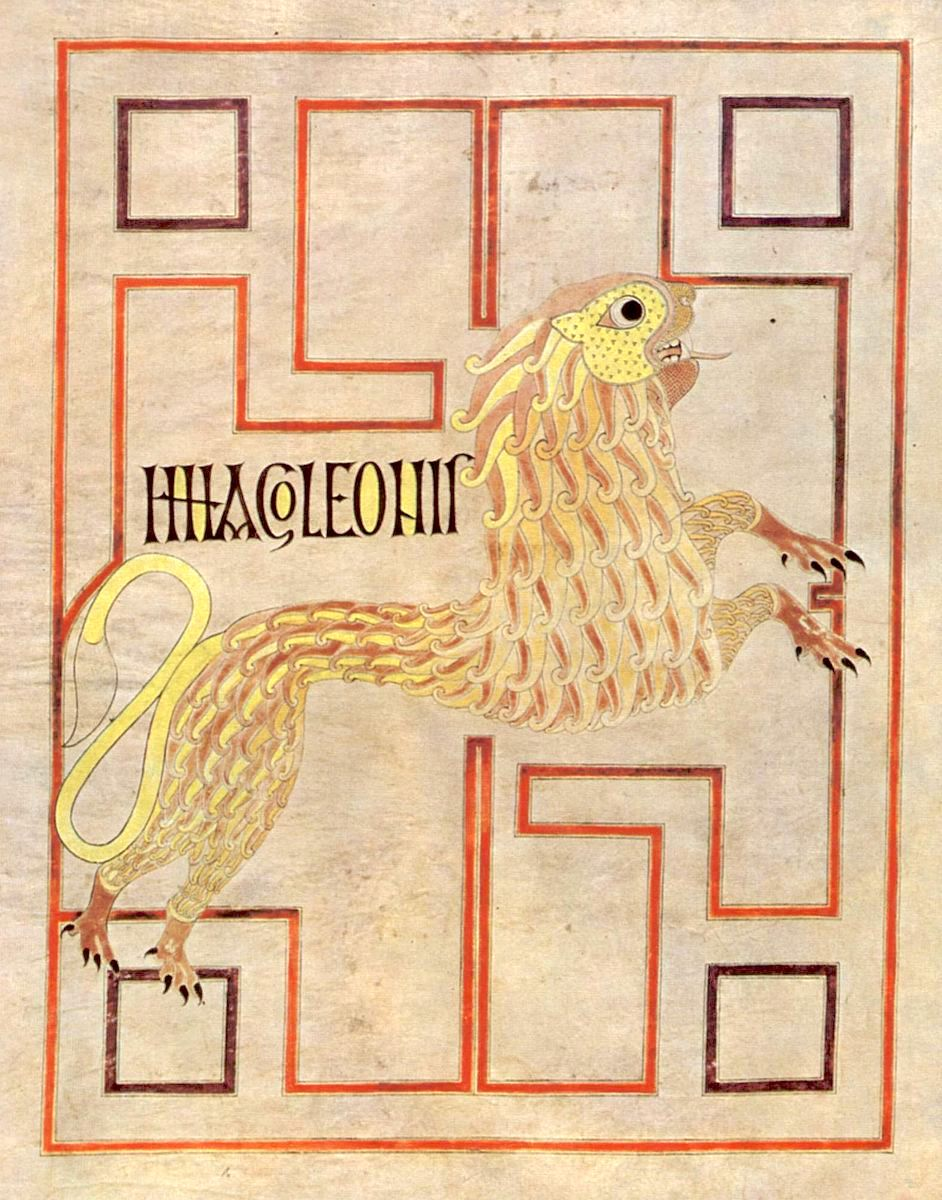
A Lion of Saint Mark, from the Echternach Gospels (late 7th century).

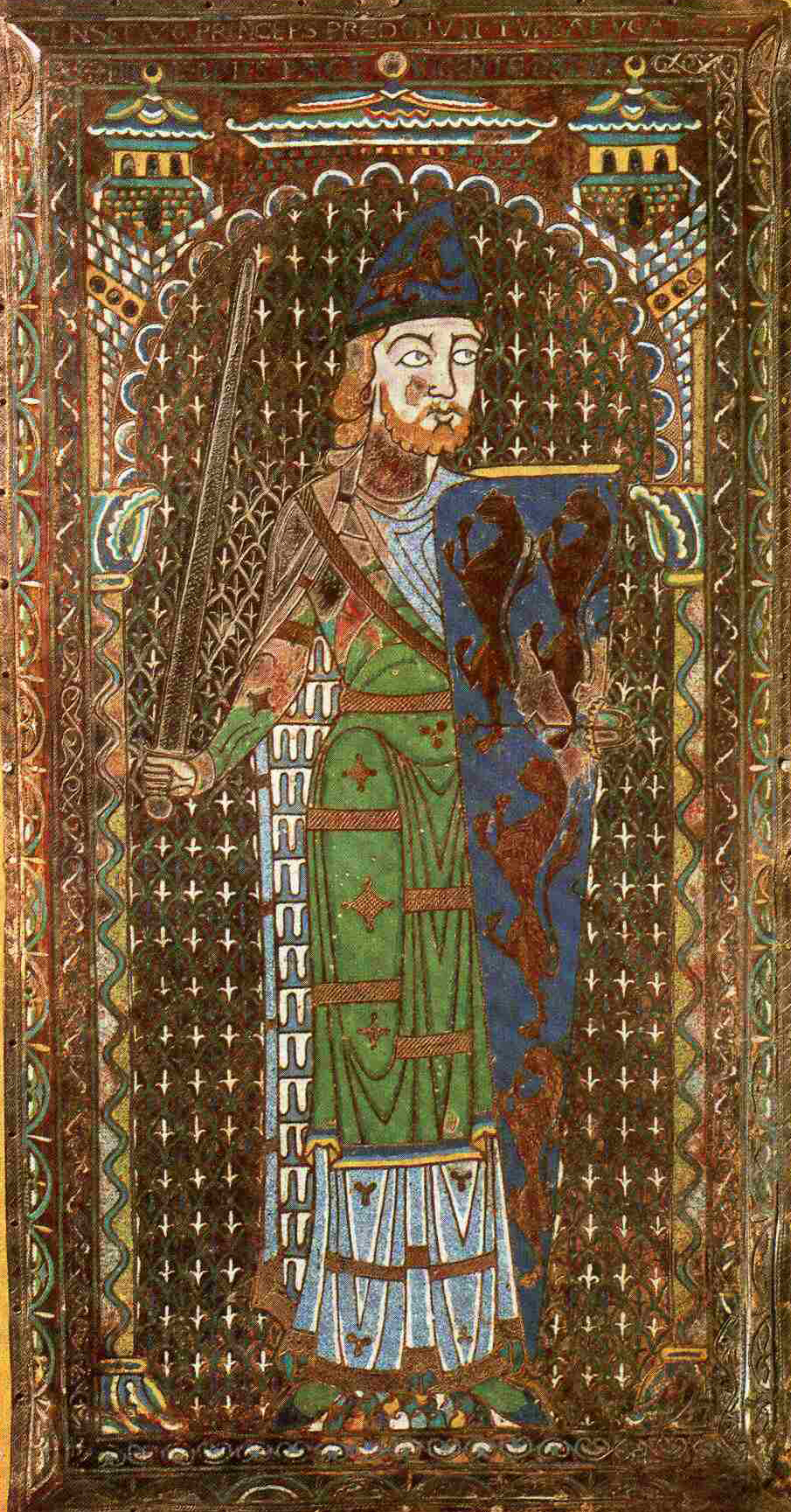
Enamel from the tomb of Geoffrey Plantagenet, Count of Anjou (c. 1160).

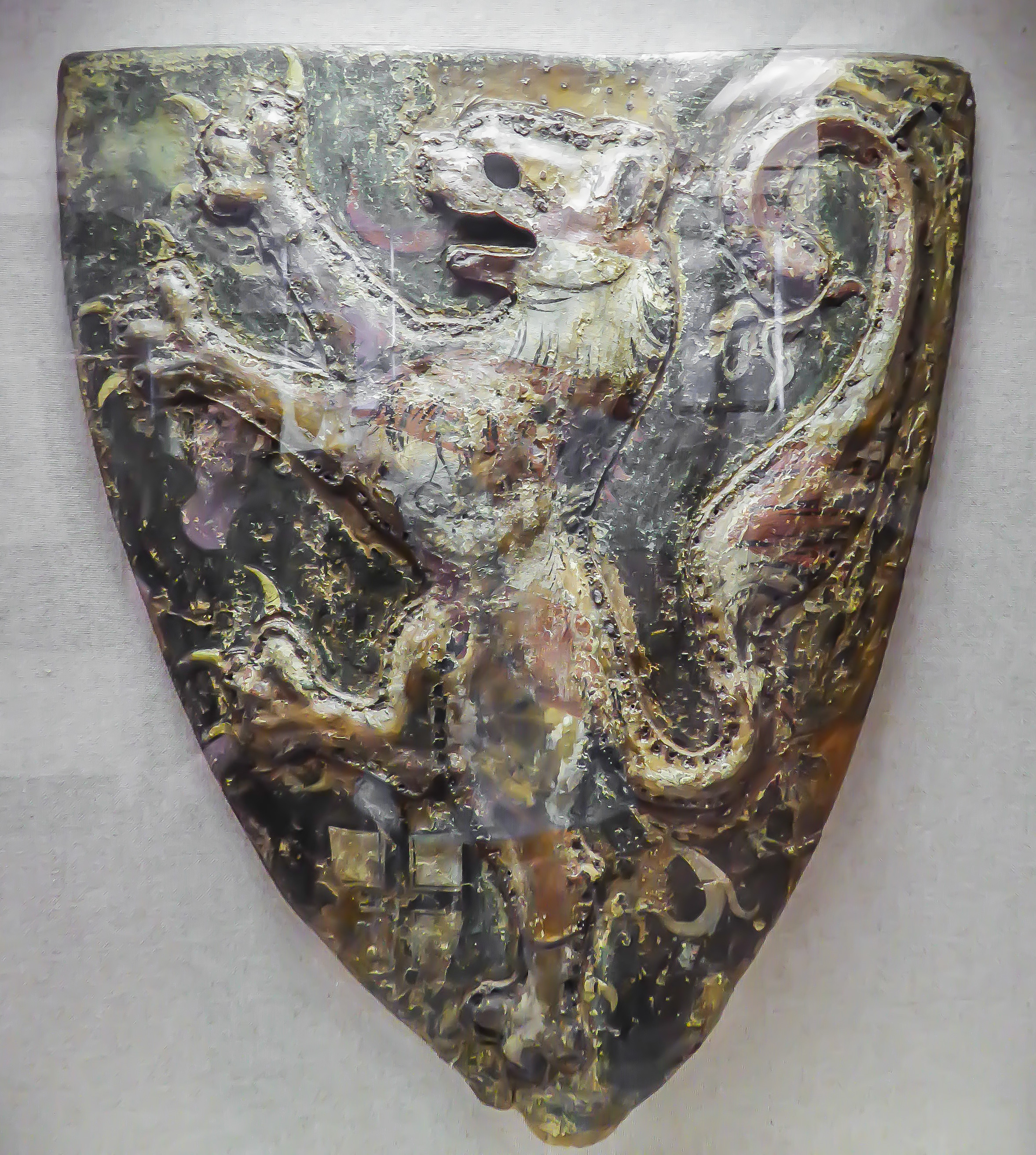
The shield of Conrad of Thuringia (c. 1230s), a rare example of a preserved 13th-century knightly shield, displaying the Ludovingian lion barry.

Coat of Arms of Armenian Kingdom of Cilicia under Hetumid dynasty (1226–1341).

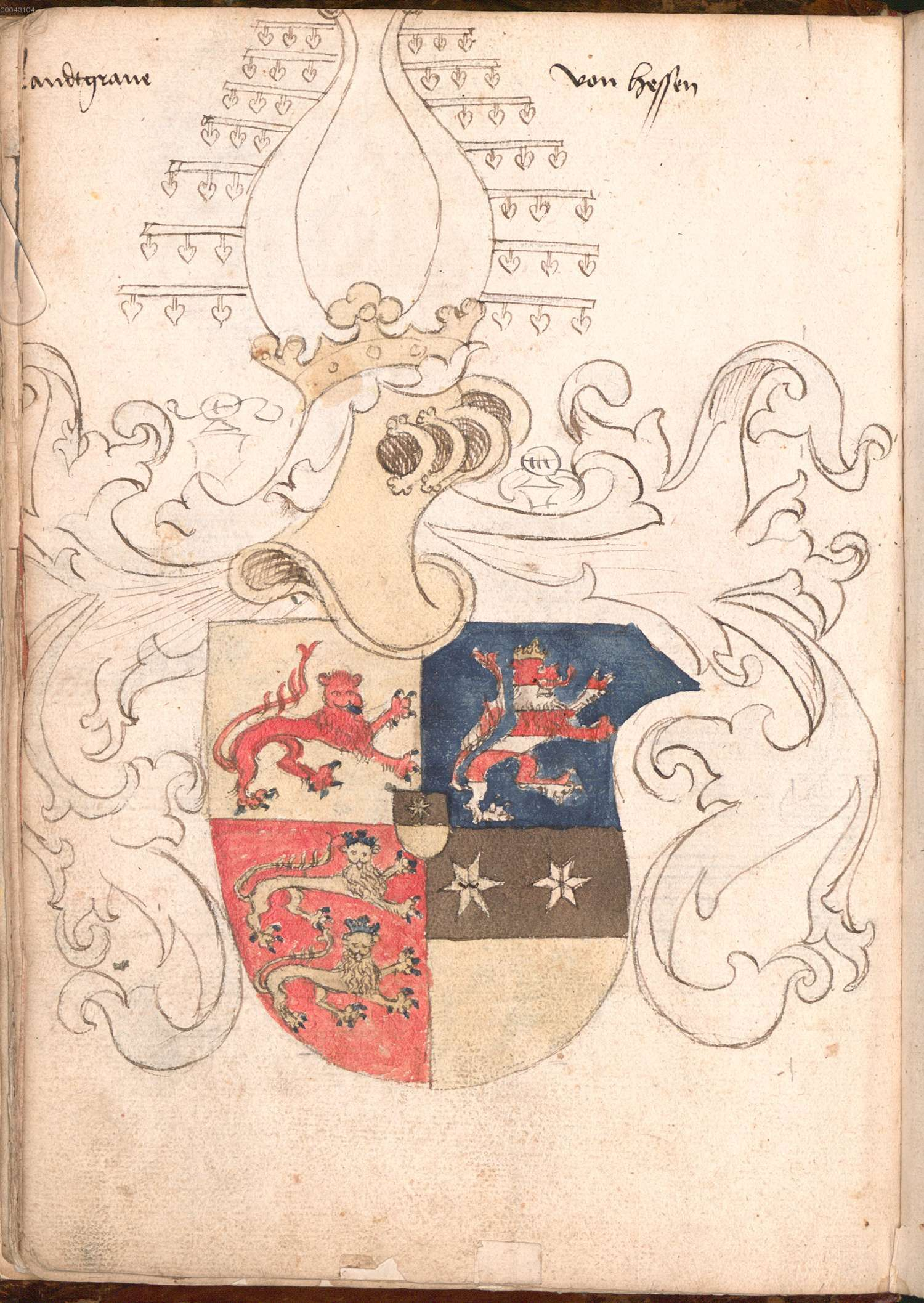
The coat of arms of the Landgrave of Hesse in the Wernigerode Armorial (late 15th century), shown as combining the lions of Hesse, Katzenelnbogen and Diez)

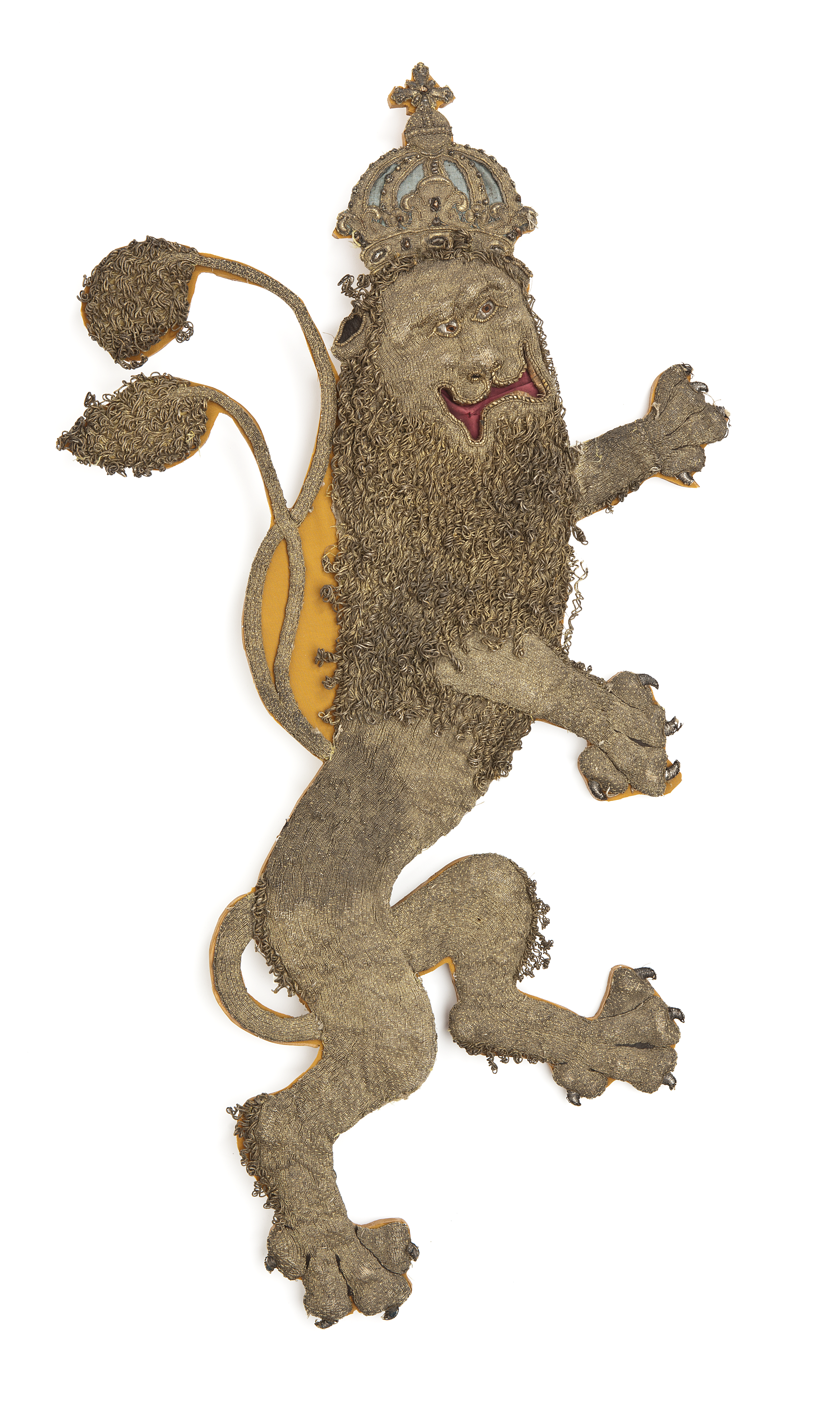
Two tailed embroidered gold lion from the end of the 17th century, Sweden.

The animal designs in the heraldry of the high medieval period are a continuation of the animal style of the Viking Age, ultimately derived from the style of Scythian art as it developed from c. the 7th century BC. Symmetrically paired animals in particular find continuation from Migration Period art via Insular art to Romanesque art and heraldry.

The animals of the "barbarian" (Eurasian) predecessors of heraldic designs are likely to have been used as clan symbols. (Note: "[Animal style designs] have also been explained as totems venerated by the various clans of nomads as ancestors. Their transformation into clan symbols would have followed naturally and easily. The heraldic beasts of medieval chivalry, which include many deer and felines like those on the British royal coat of arms, may certainly be traces back to emblematic devices of later barbarian tribes from central Asia.") Adopted in Germanic tradition around the 5th century, they were re-interpreted in a Christian context in the western kingdoms of Gaul and Italy in the 6th and 7th centuries. The characteristic of the lion as royal animal in particular is due to the influence of the Physiologus, an early Christian book about animal symbolism, originally written in Greek in the 2nd century and translated into Latin in about AD 400. It was a predecessor of the medieval bestiaries. At the time, few Europeans had a chance to encounter actual lions, so that painters had to rely on traditional depictions and had no actual animals as models.

The lion as a heraldic charge is present from the very earliest development of heraldry in the 12th century. One of the earliest known examples of armory as it subsequently came to be practiced can be seen on the tomb of Geoffrey Plantagenet, Count of Anjou, who died in 1151. An enamel, probably commissioned by Geoffrey's widow between 1155 and 1160, depicts him carrying a blue shield decorated with six golden lions rampant and wearing a blue helmet adorned with another lion. A chronicle dated to c. 1175 states that Geoffrey was given a shield of this description when he was knighted by his father-in-law, Henry I, in 1128.

Earlier heraldic writers attributed the lions of England to William the Conqueror, but the earliest evidence of the association of lions with the English crown is a seal bearing two lions passant, used by the future King John during the lifetime of his father, Henry II, who died in 1189. Since Henry was the son of Geoffrey Plantagenet, it seems reasonable to suppose that the adoption of lions as an heraldic emblem by Henry or his sons might have been inspired by Geoffrey's shield. John's elder brother, Richard the Lionheart, who succeeded his father on the throne, is believed to have been the first to have borne the arms of three lions passant-guardant, still the arms of England, having earlier used two lions rampant combatant, which arms may also have belonged to his father. Richard is also credited with having originated the English crest of a lion statant (now statant-guardant).

Apart from the lions of the Plantagenet (England and Normandy) coat of arms, 12th-century examples of lions used as heraldic charges include the Staufen (Hohenstaufen) and Wittelsbach (Palatinate) coats of arms, both deriving from Henry the Lion, the royal coat of arms of Scotland, attributed to William the Lion, (Note: Hopingius, De Insigniis (1642) claimed that the use of the red lion as an emblem goes back to the Picts) the coat of arms of Denmark, first used by Canute VI, the coat of arms of Flanders (Jülich), first used by Philip I, the coat of arms of León, an example of canting arms (Note: The actual etymology of León is Legion (Λεγίων).) attributed to Alfonso VII (1126), and the coat of arms of Bohemia, first granted to Vladislaus II.

Coats of arms of the 13th century include those of the House of Sverre (coat of arms of Norway), the Ludovingians (the lion of Hesse used by Conrad of Thuringia), Luxembourg, the kingdom of Ruthenia (Volhynia), the House of Habsburg (the Habsburgs all but abandoned their original coat of arms after gaining the Duchy of Austria in the 1270s, but it remained in use in derived lineages such as the House of Kyburg), the kingdom of Bulgaria and the Armenian Kingdom of Cilicia (Rubenids).

Unlike the eagle, which is comparatively rare in heraldry because it was reserved as an imperial symbol, the lion became a symbol of chivalry and was not restricted to royal coats of arms. The Zürich armorial (14th century) has a number of coats of arms with lions, most of them of ministeriales of the House of Habsburg.

The lion in the coat of arms of Bohemia is depicted with two tails (à la queue fourchée). According to Ménestrier, this is due to a jest made by Emperor Frederick, who granted Vladislaus II, Duke of Bohemia a coat of arms with a lion coué, that is, with its tail between its legs. Vladislaus' men refused to follow this emblem, calling it an ape, so that Frederick agreed to improve the arms by giving the lion not just one but two erect tails.

== Attitudes ==
As many attitudes (positions) now exist in heraldry as the heraldist's imagination can conjure, as a result of the ever-increasing need for differentiation, but very few of these were apparently known to medieval heralds. One distinction commonly made (especially among French heralds), although it may be of limited importance, is the distinction of lions in the walking positions as leopards. The following table summarizes the principal attitudes of heraldic lions:

Attitude	Example	Description
Rampant		A "lion rampant" is depicted in profile standing erect with forepaws raised. The position of the hind legs varies according to local custom: the lion may stand on both hind legs, braced wide apart, or on only one, with the other also raised to strike; the word rampant is often omitted, especially in early blazon, as this is the most usual position of a carnivorous quadruped. Note: the term segreant denotes the same position, but is only used in reference to winged four-legged beasts like griffins and dragons.
Salient		A "lion salient" is leaping, with both hind legs together on the ground and both forelegs together in the air. This is a very rare position for a lion, but is also used of other heraldic beasts.
Passant		A "lion passant" is walking, with the right fore paw raised and all others on the ground. A "Lion of England" denotes a lion passant guardant Or, used as an augmentation. Note: A lion thus depicted may be called a "leopard" (see discussion below).
Statant		A "lion statant" is standing, all four feet on the ground, usually with the forepaws together. This posture is more frequent in crests than in charges on shields.
Sejant erect		A "lion sejant erect" is seated on its haunches, but with its body erect and both forepaws raised in the "rampant" position (this is sometimes termed "sejant-rampant").
Sejant		A "lion sejant" is sitting on his haunches, with both forepaws on the ground.
Couchant		A "lion couchant" is lying down, but with the head raised.
Dormant		A "lion dormant" is lying down with its eyes closed and head lowered, resting upon the forepaws, as if asleep.

Other terms are used to describe the lion's position in further detail. Each coat of arms has a right and left (i.e. dexter and sinister) side - with respect to the person carrying the shield - so the left side of the shield as drawn on the page (thus the right side to the shield bearer) is called the dexter side. The lion's head is normally seen in agreement with the overall position, facing dexter (left) unless otherwise stated. If a lion's whole body is turned to face right, he is to sinister or contourné. If his whole body faces the viewer, he is affronté. If his head only faces the viewer he is guardant or gardant, and if he looks back over his shoulder he is regardant. These adjectives follow any other adjectives of position.

A lion (or other beast) coward carries the tail between its hind legs. The tail also may be knotted (nowed), forked (queue fourchée), doubled (double-queued; as in the arms of the kingdom of Bohemia), or cut off (defamed).

Lion guardant

Lion regardant

Lion coward
Lion with forked tail

Lion with crossed tail

Lion with crossed tail (reverse)

Lion with tail nowed

== Variants ==
In addition to the attitudes it is depicted in, a certain variety is present in heraldic lions regarding the presence of additional physical features. Beyond the presence of double or forked tails, heraldic lions are sometimes depicted with two heads, as in the case of the arms of the Mason of Birmingham, from whom they were passed to the University of Birmingham. Alternatively, a lion may be depicted with one head connected to two distinct bodies, in which case it its termed bicorporated. If the conjoined bodies are three, the lion is instead termed tricorporated. These multi-bodied lions, however, are very rare. Also, the claws and tongue of the lion may be described as a different tincture than a "proper" lion. If the claws are a different color, it is said to be armed of that tincture, and if the tongue is a different color it is langued of that tincture. For example, the blazon of the monarch of Scotland is Or, a lion gules, within a double tressure flory counter-flory of the same, armed and langued azure.

The arms of the Cinque Ports depict lions dimidiated with the hulks of ships, incorporating the front half of the lion and the rear of the vessel. This was originally the result of the joining of the lions or of the royal arms of England with the ships argent of the arms of the townships of the Ports. Over time, the conjoined figure came to be considered as a single heraldic charge in itself, and granted as such as new charges.

Winged lions are depicted in arms as both passant and, more commonly, sejant, and also appear as supporters. This figure is commonly referred to as the Lion of Saint Mark, although Arthur Fox-Davies defined as a Lion of Saint Mark one present in a specifically religious context and depicted with a halo. The winged lion is the traditional symbol of Venice, whose patron saint is Mark the Evangelist.

A sea-lion, also called a morse, is depicted with the tail of a fish replacing its hindquarters, hind legs and tail. It is described as naiant when depicted horizontally, and as resurgent when rising from water. They typically appear as supporters, but are also known as charges and crests. The lion-dragon is a lion with the lower body, hind legs, wings and tail of a wyvern, although Fox-Davies doubted the existence of this figure outside of heraldry books and reported not to know of any actual use of it. The man-lion, also called a lympago, possesses a human face.

A lion "morné" has no teeths nor claws. A lion "éviré" has no sign of sex. Historically lions' genital organs were prominent, and in gules, "as it now is to depict the tongue of that colour".

A lion "fleshed" of "flayed" has the skin removed, and the color of the flesh. It is a very rare term, found for example in the blazon of the dukes of Teck.

== Lions vs. leopards ==
Lion "passant guardant" or "Léopard"

Both lions and leopards may have been among the earliest beasts to appear in heraldry. The Oxford Guide to Heraldry notes that the earliest English treatise on heraldry, a late-13th or early-14th century Anglo-Norman manuscript titled De Heraudrie, mentions the crow, eagle, griffin, heron, leopard, lion, martlet, popinjay, and swan. Citing Bado Aureo, the Oxford Guide further suggests that the leopard, said to be "borne of an adulterous union between a lioness and a pard", and like a mule incapable of reproducing, may be an appropriate charge for a person born of adultery or barred from reproducing (such as an abbot).

As a general rule, English heralds tend to identify lions as rampant (upright, in profile facing dexter), and leopards as passant guardant (walking, head turned to full face), but the heraldic distinction between lions and leopards is often ambiguous and in some cases may be controversial (as in the case of the royal arms of England, discussed below). Part of the confusion arises from international differences in translation or in the defining characteristics of each, particularly in charges that show some characteristics of each.

English heraldist Arthur Charles Fox-Davies asserted in 1909 that the leopard, denoting a lion passant guardant, was a term of French origin that had "long since become obsolete in English armory. In French blazon, however, the old distinction is still observed." Fox-Davies continued, "[French heralds] term our lion passant a léopard-lionné [literally a 'lioned' leopard] and our lion rampant guardant is their lion-léopardé [literally a 'leoparded' lion]." Dutch heraldist Johannes Rietstap, however, defined a Léopard lionné as a lion rampant guardant (i.e., upright like a lion with its head turned to full face like a leopard) and a Lion léopardé as a lion passant (i.e., walking like a leopard with its head facing dexter like a lion). German-American heraldist Carl-Alexander von Volborth agrees with Rietstap's translations, in contrast to those of Fox-Davies as stated above.

As if to clarify the situation, English heraldist Hugh Clark wrote in his Introduction to Heraldry (1829):

The true heraldic lion, according to French authors, is always to be represented in profile, or, as the ancient heralds say, showing but one eye and one ear. His attitude, also, should always be rampant or ravaging. When passant and full-faced, they blazoned him a leopard, vide Lion Leopardé: in England, however, the lions in the royal and other achievements have always been blazoned as lions, however depicted since the time of Henry III, in whose reign they were called "Leopards". Lion Leopardé ... is a French term for what the English call a Lion passant gardant. The word leopard is always made use of by the French heralds to express in their language, a lion full-faced, or gardant. Thus, when a lion is placed on an escutcheon in that attitude which we call rampant gardant, the French blazon it a Lion Leopardé. When he is passant only, they call him leopard lioné.

English heraldist Charles Boutell wrote in 1890 that the lions of England were generally termed leopards until the end of the 14th century, including in the roll of arms of Henry III of England, and in a statute of Edward I of England, dating to 1300, which made reference to "signée de une teste de leopart—marked with the King's lion." In English Heraldry (1867), Boutell explained:

Only when he was in this rampant attitude did the early Heralds consider any Lion to be a Lion, and blazon him by his true name. A lion walking and looking about him, the early Heralds held to be acting the part of a leopard: consequently, when he was in any such attitude, they blazoned him as "a leopard". The animal bearing that name bore it simply as an heraldic title, which distinguished a Lion in a particular attitude. These heraldic "leopards" were drawn in every respect as other heraldic "lions", without spots or any leopardish distinction whatever. This explains the usage, retained until late in the 14th century, which assigned to the Lions of the Royal Shield of England the name of "leopards". They were so called, not by the enemies of England for derision and insult, as some persons, in their ignorance of early Heraldry, have been pleased both to imagine and to assert; but the English Kings and Princes, who well knew their "Lions" to be Lions, in blazon styled them "leopards", because they also knew that Lions in the attitude of their "Lions" were heraldic "leopards".

In Heraldry: Sources, Symbols and Meaning (1976), German heraldist Ottfried Neubecker explained:

When the blazon does not specifically mention a position, the lion may be assumed to be rampant. If he is in a different position, other terminology must be used, referring to the position of his head and limbs. An early heraldic convention found in medieval blazons uses the distinction between a lion and a leopard previously employed by the ancient Greeks. In antiquity, the lion, having a heavy mane, was generally shown in profile, while the leopard, having less hair, was shown looking towards the observer. A lion looking towards the observer therefore came to be given the name of the animal usually shown in that pose.

According to Neubecker, what in Old French is termed a léopard is always guardant (head turned toward the observer), thus the modern English heraldic terms "lion passant guardant", "lion passant", and "lion rampant guardant" correlate to the Old French terms léopard, lion léopardé, and léopard lionné, respectively.

A lion.

A lion léopardé.

A leopard.

A leopard lionné.

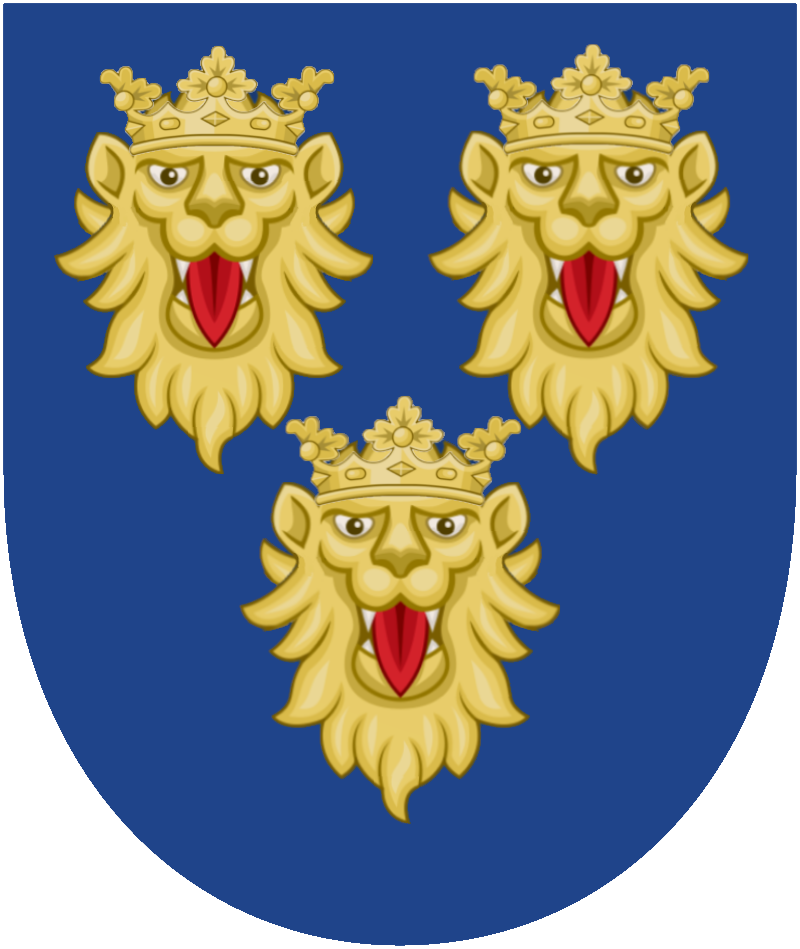
Coat of arms of Dalmatia, showing three crowned lions guardant

== Gallery ==
=== Lions as heraldic charge ===
==== Lions rampant ====
A small group of examples is depicted listed below.

Coat of arms of Flanders (based on the comital coat of arms, 12th century)

Arms of Belgium and of the former province of Brabant (based on the arms of the Duchy of Brabant, 12th century)

Shield from the coat of arms of the Kingdom of Scotland (13th century). Currently appears as the second quarter of the Royal coat of arms of the United Kingdom (or the first and last quarters in Scotland).

Coat of arms of Norway (13th century, 1992 design shown)

Coat of arms of the Duchy of Limburg (1101–1795 and 1839–1866)

Small coat of arms of the Czech Republic (1992, based on the coat of arms of the Kingdom of Bohemia, 13th century)

Escutcheon (without crest and supporters, which are different) of the Grand-Duchy of Luxembourg and since 1839 of the Belgian Province of Luxembourg

Canting coat of arms of the Kingdom of León with the royal crest, based on the royal arms (12th century)

Ruthenian lion, coat of arms of the Kingdom of Ruthenia (13th – 14th century, later adopted by West Ukrainian People's Republic)

Barry lion in the arms of the German state of Hesse. The state of Thuringia uses a nearly identical coat of arms, both derived from the Ludovingian coat of arms (13th century).

Canting coat of arms of Lyon, France (14th century, based on the older comital coat of arms)

Coat of arms of the Philippines (1946, the lion being derived from that of León)

The Lion of Judah on the municipal emblem of Jerusalem (1949)

Emblem of Cartago Province, Costa Rica's first capital (1821)

Coat of arms of Spain

Coat of arms of the Territory of the Saar Basin (1920–1935)

Current Coat of arms of Saarland

Coat of arms of Rhineland-Palatinate

Coat of arms of the Dutch province of Limburg

Coat of arms of Belgian province of Limburg

Coat of arms of the Subcarpathian Voivodeship, Poland

Coat of arms of Dresden, capital of the German State of Saxony

Coat of arms of Leipzig, Germany

Coat of arms of Liepāja, Latvia. The lion being derived from that of the Duchy of Courland and Semigallia (1925, based on the 17th-century coat of arms)

==== Lions passant ====
Royal Arms of England, based on the 12th-century Plantagenet coat of arms

Coat of arms of Denmark, based on the 12th-century Estridsen coat of arms

Arms of Llywelyn the Great (13th century), used by the Prince of Wales since 1911.

Coat of arms of Estonia (based on the Estridsen coat of arms, variants in use since the 13th century)

Coat of arms of Baden-Württemberg (1954, derived from the 13th-century Hohenstaufen coat of arms)

Coat of arms of Montenegro (2004, the lion ultimately derived from the Lion of Saint Mark used by the Republic of Venice)

==== Lions couchant ====
Arms of Arahal municipality in Spain, (Note: Accorded to the city, gifted by Charles V in 1554. The year number is encoded in the biblical motto, Absorta est mors in victoria, from Corinthians 15:54) showing a lion couchant proper (1554)

Arms of Belgorod Oblast, Russia, showing a lion couchant Or (1727)

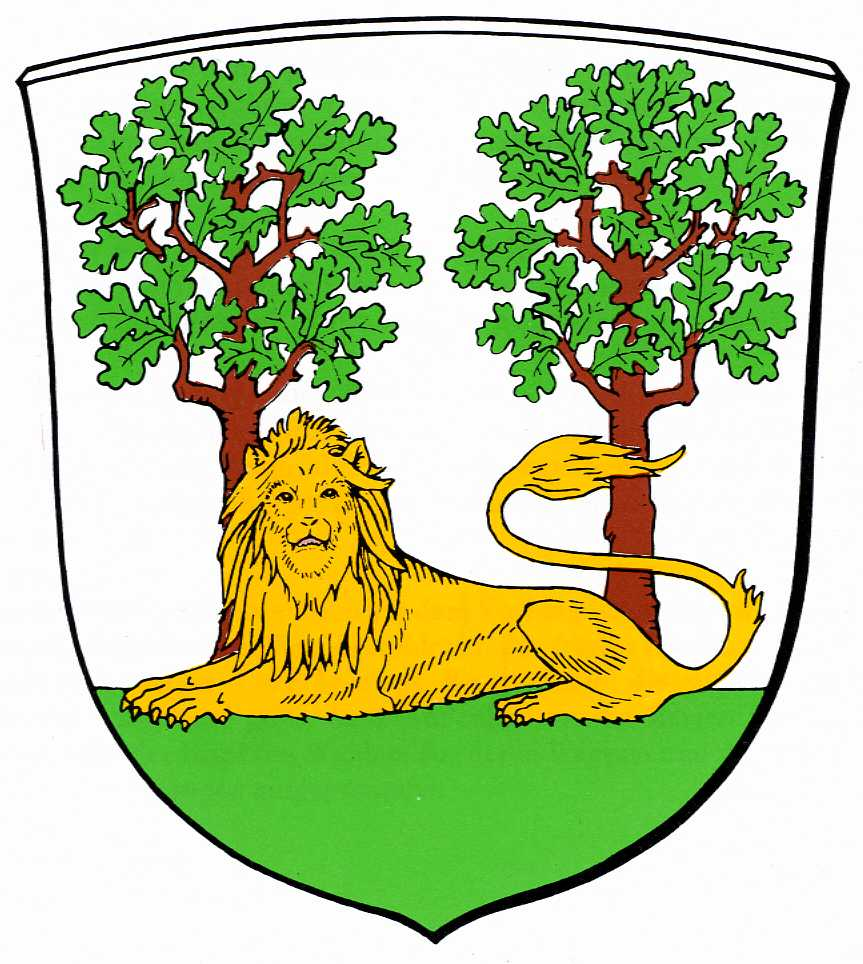
Arms of the Burgdorf district in Hanover, showing a lion couchant guardant (1940)

Arms of Rødøy Municipality in Norway, showing a lion couchant gules (1988)

=== Lions in crest ===
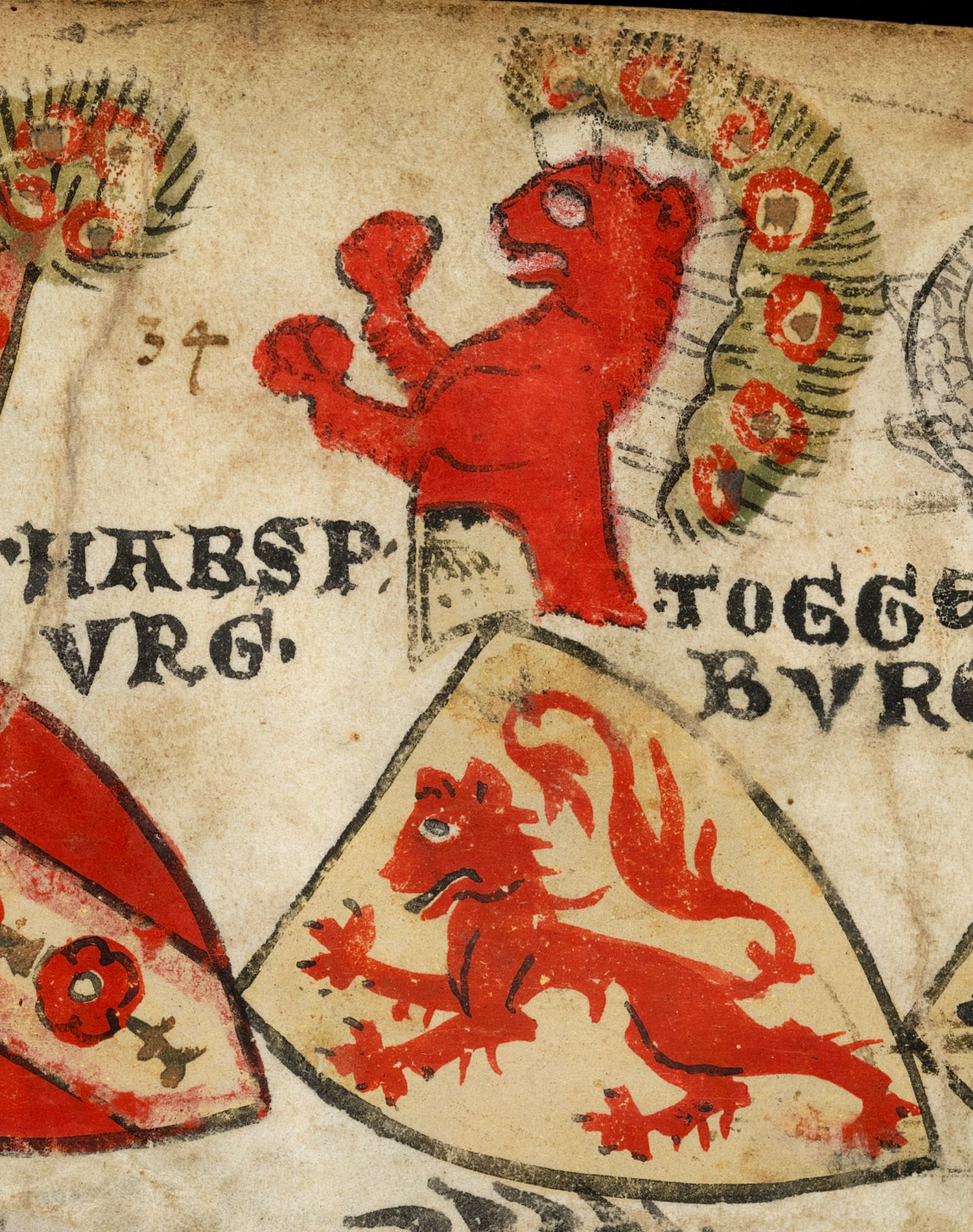
Noble arms of the Habsburgs, from Zürcher Wappenrolle (c. 1340)

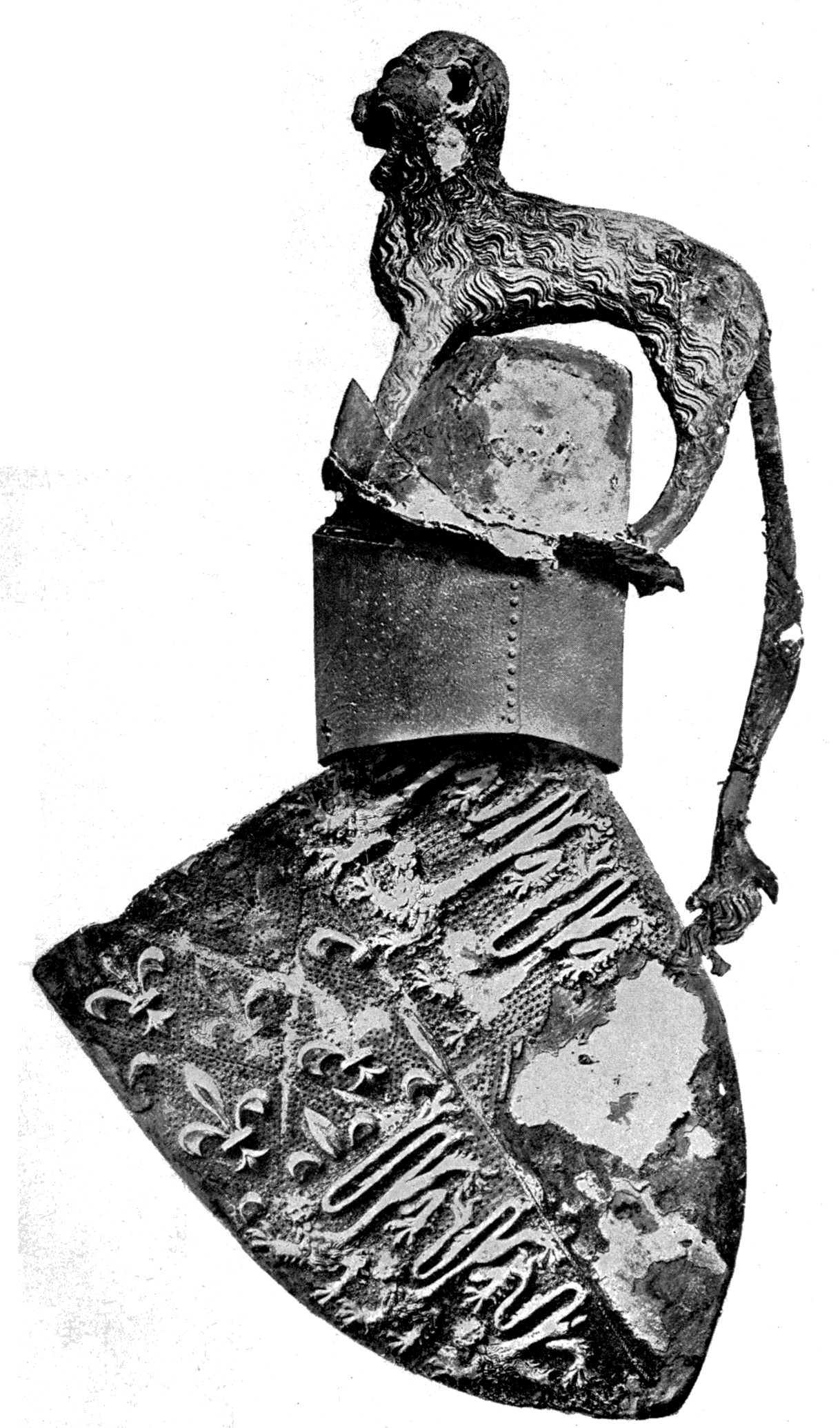
Shield, helmet and crest of Edward, the Black Prince, suspended over his tomb in Canterbury Cathedral

Coat of arms of Philip I of Castile (1506) with the symbol representing the Leonese kingdom, along with a castle, imperially crowned in the top (chivalric design proper of Golden Fleece Roll), Medieval Spain

Royal arms of the United Kingdom: A lion statant guardant on the crest

Crest of the royal arms of Scotland (1837), a lion sejant affrontée Gules, imperially crowned Or, holding in the dexter paw a sword and in the sinister paw a scepter both erect and Proper.

Noble arms of the Polish Wieniawa family

Coat of arms of the British South Africa Company (19th century)

=== Lions as supporters ===
Coat of arms of Sweden (15th century)

Royal coat of arms of the United Kingdom, Scottish version (2022)

Coat of arms of the Congo Free State (1885-1908)

Coat of arms of Chad

Coat of arms of Czechoslovakia (1918-1961)

Coat of arms of The Gambia

Coat of arms of Kenya

Coat of arms of Morocco (1957)

Coat of arms of Armenia (1992)

Coat of arms of Bulgaria (1997, based on 19th-century coat of arms)

Coat of arms of Georgia (2004, based on 18th-century royal coats of arms)

Coat of arms of Latvia (1921)

Coat of arms of New South Wales

Great coat of arms of Belgium

Royal coat of arms of The Netherlands

Western depictions

Heraldic lions have also found their way onto municipal or county seals in the United States.

=== Eastern depictions ===
Outside of classical heraldry, lions have also found their way onto the coats of arms or emblems used by modern states in Asia, often based on traditional depictions of lions in the respective cultures or regions.

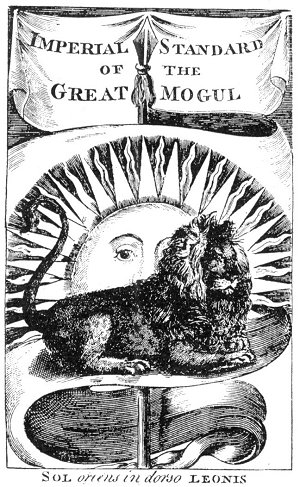
Imperial Standard of Mughal Empire

Coat of arms of the Kingdom of Iraq (1932-1959), depicting the lion and horse

Emblem of India (1950), depicting the lions of the Pillars of Ashoka

Emblem of Tibet with a pair of snow lions (1959, based on the 1906 Flag of Tibet)

Emblem of Sri Lanka (1972)

Coat of arms of Tajikistan, 1992–1993

Royal arms of Cambodia (1993)

== See also ==
- Leo Belgicus
- Lion of Judah
- Lion of Saint Mark
- Gallery of flags with one or more lions
- Heraldry of León
- Marzocco
- The Lion and the Unicorn
- Snow Lion

== Bibliography ==
- Boutell, Charles (1867). English Heraldry. London and New York: Cassell, Petter and Galpin – via Internet Archive.
- Boutell, Charles; Aveling, S. T. (1890). Heraldry, Ancient and Modern: Including Boutell's Heraldry. London: Frederick Warne. OCLC 6102523 – via Internet Archive.
- Clark, Hugh; Planché, J. R. (1866). An Introduction to Heraldry (18th ed.). London: Bell & Daldy. OL 14015165M.
- Fox-Davies, Arthur Charles (1909). A Complete Guide to Heraldry. London: T. C. and E. C. Jack. OL 7101030M. Also at A Complete Guide to Heraldry – via Wikisource.
- Garai, Jana (1973). The Book of Symbols. New York: Simon & Schuster. ISBN 0-671-21773-9.
- Honour, Hugh; Fleming, John (2005). A World History of Art. Laurence King. ISBN 9781856694513.
- Neubecker, Ottfried (1976). Heraldry: Sources, Symbols and Meaning. New York: McGraw-Hill. ISBN 9780070463080.
- Nisbet, Alexander (1816). A system of heraldry: Speculative and practical. Vol. 1. Edinburgh: W. Blackwood. OCLC 847960765.
- Onians, John (2004). Atlas of World Art. Laurence King Publishing. ISBN 9781856693776.
- Pastoureau, Michel (1997). Heraldry: An Introduction to a Noble Tradition. Abrams Discoveries. Harry N. Abrams. ISBN 9780810928305.
- Rietstap, Johannes (1884). Armorial Général (in French). Gouda: G. B. van Goor Zonen.
- Shanzer, Danuta; Mathisen, Ralph W. (2013). Romans, Barbarians, and the Transformation of the Roman World: Cultural Interaction and the Creation of Identity in Late Antiquity. Ashgate Publishing. ISBN 9781409482093.
- Stothard, C. A. (1817). Monumental Effigies of Great Britain. plate 2.; as illustrated in Wagner, Anthony; Herald, Richmond (1946). Heraldry in England. Penguin. plate I.
- von Volborth, Carl-Alexander (1983). Heraldry: Customs, Rules and Styles. Dorset: Blandford Press. ISBN 0-7137-0940-5. LCCN 81670212.
- Woodcock, Thomas; Robinson, John Martin (1988). The Oxford Guide to Heraldry. Oxford: Oxford University Press. ISBN 0-19-211658-4.
- Woodward, John; Burnett, George (1892) [1884]. A treatise on heraldry, British and foreign: with English and French glossaries. Edinburgh: W. & A. B. Johnson. LCCN 02020303 – via Internet Archive.
