= Singhi Chham =

Dance form of Sikkim, India

Singhi Chham or Kanchendzonga Dance is a lion dance form in Sikkim whereby the dancers perform in a lion costume that represents the snow lion. It is a dance of the Bhutia people, and was said to have been introduced by Chador Namgyal, the third Chogyal of Sikkim, in the 18th century. It is usually performed during the Panglapsool festival.

In this dance, there may be two to four snow lions, each snow lion consists of two men in a lion costume, which is white with a bluish mane. The dance is accompanied by a single drummer. It has religious association as the peaks of Kangchenjunga (Khang-Chen Dzong Pa), which is sacred to the people of Sikkim, are believed to resemble the legendary snow lion.
