= Emblem of Tibet =

Symbol of the Tibetan government in exile

National Emblem of Tibet

Versions
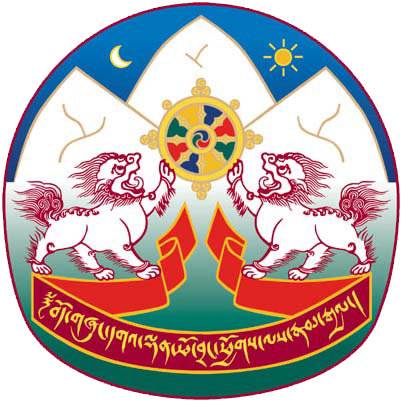

- Version used the Asian Relations Conference in Delhi in 1947

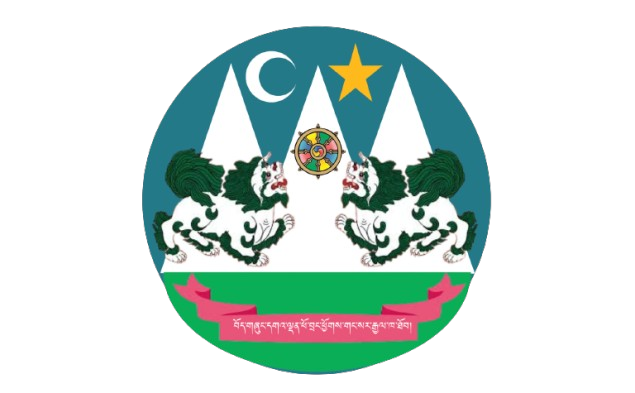
- Armiger: Central Tibetan Administration
- Adopted: by 1947
- Supporters: Two Tibetan Snow Lions
- Motto: བོད་གཞུང་དགའ་ལྡན་ཕོ་བྲང་ཕྱོགས་ལས་རྣམ་རྒྱལ "bod gzhung dga' ldan pho brang phyogs las rnam rgyal" (bö zhung gan den po drang chok lê nam gyel) or "Government of Tibet, Ganden Palace, victorious in all directions"

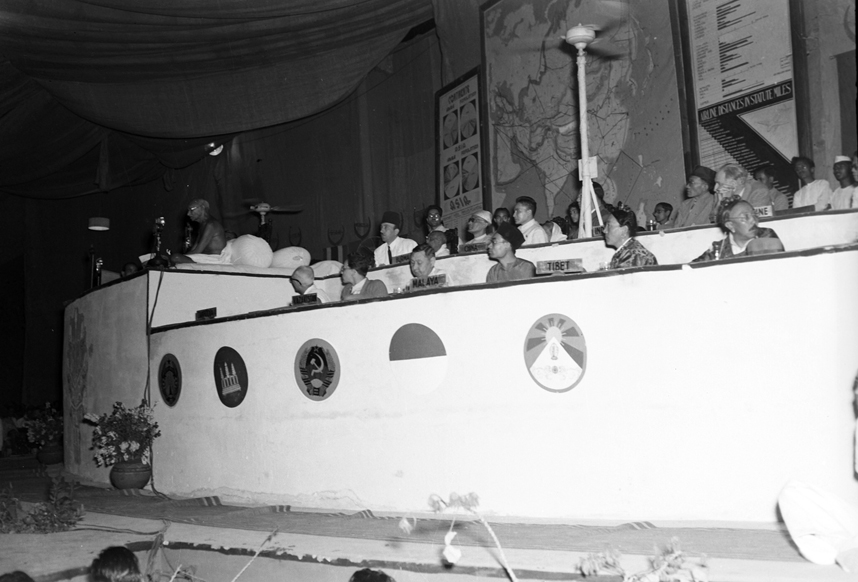
Photograph of Gandhi speaking at the 1947 Asian Relations Conference; the Tibetan emblem is visible under the Tibetan delegate.

The Emblem of Tibet is a symbol of the Tibetan government in exile. It combines several elements of the flag of Tibet, with slightly different artistry, and contains many Buddhist symbols. Its primary elements are the sun and moon above the Himalayas, which represent Tibet, often known as the Land Surrounded by Snow Mountains. On the slopes of the mountains stand a pair of snow lions. Held between the two lions is the eight-spoked Dharmachakra, represent the Noble Eightfold Path of Buddhism. Inside the wheel, the three-colored swirling jewel represents the practices of the ten exalted virtues and the 16 humane modes of conduct. The inscription on the swirling banner below is as follows: bod gzhung dga' ldan pho brang phyogs las rnam rgyal ("Government of Tibet, Ganden Palace, victorious in all directions".) The Ganden Palace, located in Drepung monastery was the residence of the Dalai Lamas until the 5th Dalai Lama. After the 5th Dalai Lama had moved to the Potala in the mid 17th century the Tibetan Government created by him in 1642 became known as the "Ganden Phodrang" Government.

It is the official emblem of the Central Tibetan Administration government-in-exile headquartered in Dharamsala, India. Along with their flag, the emblem is considered a symbol of the Tibetan independence movement and is thus banned in the People's Republic of China, including the Tibet Autonomous Region, which corresponds to the former area of control of the government of Tibet at Lhasa, as well as other areas in greater Tibet. The emblem is often seen printed in black-and-white and crimson-and-white variants, which is characteristic of the colors commonly seen in Buddhist iconography and dress.

== See also ==
- Flag of Tibet
- Emblem of Bhutan
