= Asian Relations Conference =

International conference of Asian countries held in 1947

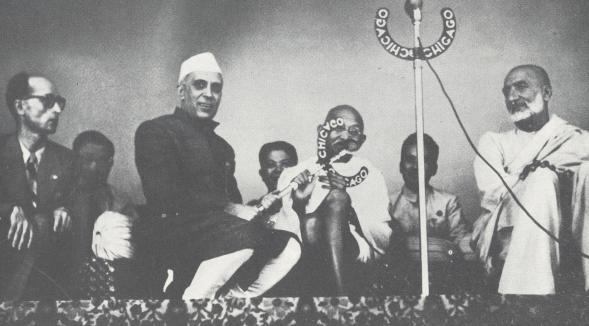
Jawaharlal Nehru, Gandhi and Abdul Ghaffar Khan at the Asian Relations Conference, Delhi

The Asian Relations Conference was an international conference that took place in New Delhi from 23 March to 2 April 1947. Organized by the Indian Council of World Affairs (ICWA), the conference was hosted by Jawaharlal Nehru, then the Vice-President of the interim Viceroy's Executive Council, and presided over by Sarojini Naidu. Its goal was to promote cultural, intellectual and social exchange between Asian countries.

Envisioned as apolitical, the conference included almost all Asian countries, as well as several independence movements. These included nations and communities that were on opposing sides, which inevitably raised political questions. Although the conference achieved an immediate sense of solidarity among Asian nations and saw the establishment of the Asian Relations Organisation, suspicions of an Indian or Chinese hegemony held by the minor nations did not allow the organisation to be effective, nor the second Asian Relations Conference held in 1950 to be as successful as the first.

== Background ==
=== Origins ===
It is not known who first conceived the idea of the Asian conference. Though Nehru stated, in the opening speech of the conference, that "the idea of such a conference arose simultaneously in many minds and many countries of Asia", some observers at the conference attributed it to Nehru. As early as December 1945, Jawaharlal Nehru stated in an interview that an Asian conference could further promote cooperation between Asian countries. Reporter Phillips Talbot stated that the conference was conceived by Nehru in 1946 as a response to the impact of the Second World War on Asia. In March of that year, Nehru had a meeting with Aung San during his South East Asia tour. It was reported that the topic of an Asian conference was discussed. In August, he credited the 1927 League against Imperialism, which he attended, as his inspiration for an Asian conference. Another possible engineer of the conference was B. Shiva Rao, who was involved in the Indian Institute of International Affairs (IIIA) and the Indian Council of World Affairs (ICWA), and who attended Institute of Pacific Relations (IPR) and United Nations conferences. In September 1945, he proposed the idea of an Asian conference, parallel to that of the United Nations', to the ICWA and Nehru.

The decision to organise the conference was formalized on 21 May 1946 by the Executive Committee of the ICWA, The ICWA claimed to be "an unofficial and non-political body" which would "not express an opinion on any aspect of Indian or international affairs", though Nehru had stated that the conference "might develop a solidarity and strength which could lead to a real inter-Asian policy." The ICWA was a private organisation, freeing the conference from the influence of the Viceroy's Executive Council, though Nehru had sought backing from the government, only to be turned down by Minister of Finance Liaquat Ali Khan who saw the conference as a chance for Nehru to amass personal glory. The cultural aspect of the conference was emphasized to avoid disapproval from the West. The format was modelled after the 1945 IPR Conference at Hot Springs, Virginia, which was attended by the ICWA. In a speech on 22 August 1946, Nehru stated in a speech that the conference "will help to promote good relations with neighbouring countries. It will help to pool ideas and experience with a view to raising living standards. It will strengthen cultural, social and economic ties among the peoples of Asia." The conference was envisioned by Nehru to be non-political, though this would prove difficult as the conference needed to balance the positions of various conflicting nations.

Active preparations began on 31 August 1946, when the Organising Committee was established. Nehru was made President of the Committee, which included Sarojini Naidu, Sarvepalli Radhakrishnan, Abul Kalam Azad, Asaf Ali, Baldev Singh, Shanti Swaroop Bhatnagar, G. D. Birla, Hannah Sen, Hansa Jivraj Mehta, Kamaladevi Chattopadhyay, Bidhan Chandra Roy, Vijaya Lakshmi Pandit, Zakir Husain and Ishtiaq Hussain Qureshi. Nehru joined the Interim Government of India in September, and it was thought inappropriate for him to be the President of the committee. Sarojini Naidu was elected the President in Nehru's place. Funding was largely acquired through public subscription, along with donations from businesses such as the Birlas and the Tata Group. Several princely states ruler, including that of Baroda, Patiala and Jaipur, were personally persuaded by Naidu to provide cars, drivers, fuel and lodgings for delegates in their Delhi houses.

The conference raised concerns from the West of a possible Asian bloc, and Nehru had to affirm that the conference would not "be opposed in any way to America or the Soviet Union or any other power or group of powers."

The topics of discussions were originally to be settled by the various Asian countries, but owing to time constraints 8 topics, to be discussed in "Round Tables", were eventually selected by the ICWA:

1. National Movements for Freedom
2. Racial Problems
3. Inter-Asian Migration
4. Transition from Colonial to National Economy
5. Agricultural Reconstruction and Industrial Development
6. Labour Problems and Social Services
7. Cultural Problems
8. Status of Women and Women's Movement

"Defence and Security questions" was originally the first topic, but it was replaced by "National Movements for Freedom" to avoid controversial political issues at the conference.

=== Delegates invited ===
All Asian countries were invited, along with Egypt who was thought to be closely aligned to the Middle East, and observers from the West. Nehru had also requested delegations to include "at least one woman [sic] delegate from your country who will be able to assist the Conference by presenting the women's point of view on the various matters before the conference and, in particular, in the discussing of the status of women and women's movements in Asia which is one of the main topics suggested for the agenda." In total, delegates from 28 countries and 8 institutions attended the conference.

Japan was invited but did not attend, as foreign travel was prohibited by the Supreme Commander for the Allied Powers (SCAP). Nehru stated that he would not give representation of the Japanese to General Douglas MacArthur or the SCAP over the Japanese people themselves. For the attendees, while most delegates did not oppose the attendance of Japan as the conference was of a non-political nature, a delegate from the Philippines objected to Japan's inclusion due to Japanese war crimes in the Philippines.

The All-India Muslim League, which viewed itself as the sole representation of Muslims in India, declined the invitation to the conference. The ICWA was seen as closely aligned with the Indian National Congress and as a Brahmin-dominated institution. In a statement, the League denounced the conference as "a thinly disguised attempt on the part of the Hindu Congress to boost itself politically as the prospective leader of the Asiatic peoples" and the "sole cultural representative of this vast sub-continent." The organisers, meanwhile, argued that "political problems, particularly of a controversial character or relating to the internal affairs of any participating countries are deliberately excluded from the agenda of the Conference." Syria, Lebanon and Yemen did not participate in the conference due to this boycott.

Six Kenyan leaders, upon hearing news of a conference of colonised nations, wrote to Nehru asking for African representation in the conference. Nehru denied on the basis that it was an Asian conference, but invited Kenyan observers. Nehru also offered scholarships to Africans studying in India. In a private letter to Shafa'at Ahmad Khan, former Indian High Commissioner to South Africa, Nehru wrote that "this will indicate to Africa and to the world how much interested we are in the advance and progress of backward peoples."

== Conference ==
The conference was held between 23 March and 2 April 1947, lasting for 10 days. The President of the Organizing Committee of the Conference was Sarojini Naidu. Its opening and closing session were held publicly under a large pandal in Purana Qila.

The opening session featured speeches by Naidu and Nehru. In his speech, Nehru reiterated that the conference "shall not discuss the internal politics of any country because that is rather beyond the scope of our present meeting", and that his intentions for the conference was that "some permanent Asian Institute for the study of common problems and to bring about closer relations will emerge" and "also perhaps a School of Asian Studies."

The official language of the conference was English, though Russian, French, Arabic, Persian, and Chinese interpreters were available. Some delegates, such as Tibet, brought their own interpreters. In one session, the idea of a new auxiliary language for Asia was discussed. Indian linguist Baburam Saxena denounced English and suggested Hindu, while the Soviet republics suggested Russian. There were some support for the use of Esperanto. Alfred Bonne, professor of psychology and member of the Jewish delegation, proposed a new language based on Esperanto. Ultimately, English prevailed as the international Asian language when the Georgian delegation, who did not speak English, agreed to its use.

=== China and Tibet ===
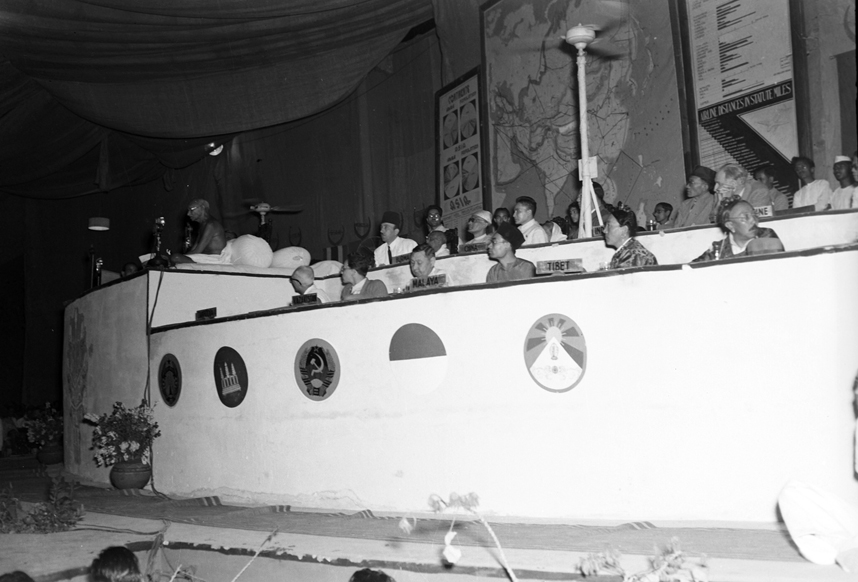
Two Tibetan delegates (front right) during the Asian Relations Conference in Delhi in 1947 as Mahatma Gandhi speaks (far left). The Emblem of the Kazakh SSR as well as Tibet's were shown.

Tibet received an invitation through Hugh Edward Richardson, the Representative of British India in Lhasa, who advised the Tibetans that it would be a good opportunity to assert Tibet's de facto independence. The team of delegates, geshes, interpreters and servants was led by Teiji Tsewang Rigzing Sampho and Khenchung Lobsang Wangyal of the Tibetan Foreign Office. The delegation brought along with them documents relating to the Indo-Tibetan borders, including the original copy of the Simla Convention, in hope of reclaiming the disputed North-East Frontier Tracts.

While the Republic of China enjoyed cordial relations with India, China viewed Tibet as their sovereign territory and protested Nehru's invitation to Tibet. Dai Jitao, who was supposed to lead the delegation, declined to attend due to the Tibetan issue. K. P. S. Menon, India's Agent-General in China, had to convince China that the conference was a cultural organization where no political conclusions could be drawn. He also agreed to call Tibetan delegates "representatives" instead. In a letter to Menon, Nehru wrote that he was "unable to understand Chinese attitude to Asian Conference when Conference Organisers have fully explained the position which is in no way injurious to Chinese interests. Non-official cultural conference cannot be expected to consider political niceties."

The Tibetan delegation heard about the Chinese opposition for the first time when they arrived at Calcutta. They sent their servants ahead to Delhi, to see if their invitation and accommodations were cancelled. The Indian Government assured that they were still invited. It was reported the journey from Lhasa to New Delhi took 21 days. Upon their arrival, they were urged by Nehru to keep the conference non-political and not to raise their border issue. The Tibetan delegates agreed not to be the first to raise the border issue, but would "not remain a silent spectator if the Chinese did."

During the conference, Chinese observer George Yeh protested to Nehru that the map on the stage showed Tibet as independent of China, and that the Chinese delegation would withdraw unless the map was corrected. According to one account, Yeh, a calligrapher and painter, was eventually allowed by Nehru to paint Tibet the same colour as China. Later, the Chinese Ambassador in India attempted to bribe the Tibetan delegations, asking them not to pursue the Tibetan border dispute in exchange of a sum of money, supposedly for expenses related to the conference, though this was refused by the Tibetans. Eventually, Chiang Kai-shek sent a message to the Chinese Embassy in Delhi, saying that he absolutely wanted the Tibetans to accept the money, which was once again refused by Teiji Sampho in a personal telegram. The conference also saw the first appearance of the flag of Tibet at an international gathering, but also was the last international event Tibet participated in, before their annexation by the People's Republic of China in 1950.

Outside of the dispute with China, the Tibetans were not high-profile participants of the conference, partly due to their isolation from international politics. Their main interest was religion, and they bought a message from the Dalai Lama.

On the other hand, China remained active in the discussions on "Racial Problems" and "Inter-Asian Migration." Chinese delegates were concerned about the legal status of Chinese immigrant populations in Southeast Asian. The Southeast Asian nations, including Ceylon, Burma, and Malaya, accused the Chinese and Indian immigrants of being "narrow minded" and "refus[ing] to assimilate", and called for the dual citizenship (and allegiance) issue of these immigrants to be resolved. Chinese delegate Wen Yuan-ning, who headed the discussions, called for equality of "persons of foreign origin who have settled in a country." The consensus reached was that equality for all citizens should be respected. At the closing session, George Yeh announced to the public that China would host the next session in 1949, though the second conference never materialized.

Other notable Chinese delegates included their leader Zheng Yanfen, Han Lih-wu, Yi Yun Chen and Tan Yun-Shan.

=== French Indochina and Vietnam ===
High Commissioner in Indochina Georges Thierry d'Argenlieu initially did not wish to accept the invitations for French Indochina in fear of anti-French demonstration at the conference, but changed his mind to avoid representation given to the Viet Minh, Khmer Issarak or the Lao Issara. The delegations for French Indochina was handpicked by the French. Princess Pingpeang Yukanthor represented Cambodia, Dang Ngoc Chan represented Cochinchina and Ouroth Souvarnavong represented Laos.

North Vietnam, on the other hand, was represented by Tran Van Luan (Deputy of the National Assembly), Tran Van Giau (Former President of the Viet Minh Resistance Committee in Cochinchina) and Mai Te Chau (Permanent delegate of the Viet Minh in New Delhi). The delegations reported that two squads of messengers were killed while smuggling credentials from Ho Chi Minh's headquarters in Bangkok, and arrived late at the conference. At the conference, the North Vietnamese denounced French imperialism and asked for help against the French. They made various requests to India, such as the formation of a "fighting federation", for India to recognize their government and intervene in the UN on their behalf. When they began reading a message from Ho Chi Minh, Nehru, despite his known sympathies to Ho, interrupted their speech. Nehru argued that he could only provide moral support to the Vietnamese, as any non-moral support would mean war with the French. Asian specialist Evelyn Colbert wrote that his decision was influenced by India's hope to enter negotiations over France's enclave in India with the French.

=== India ===
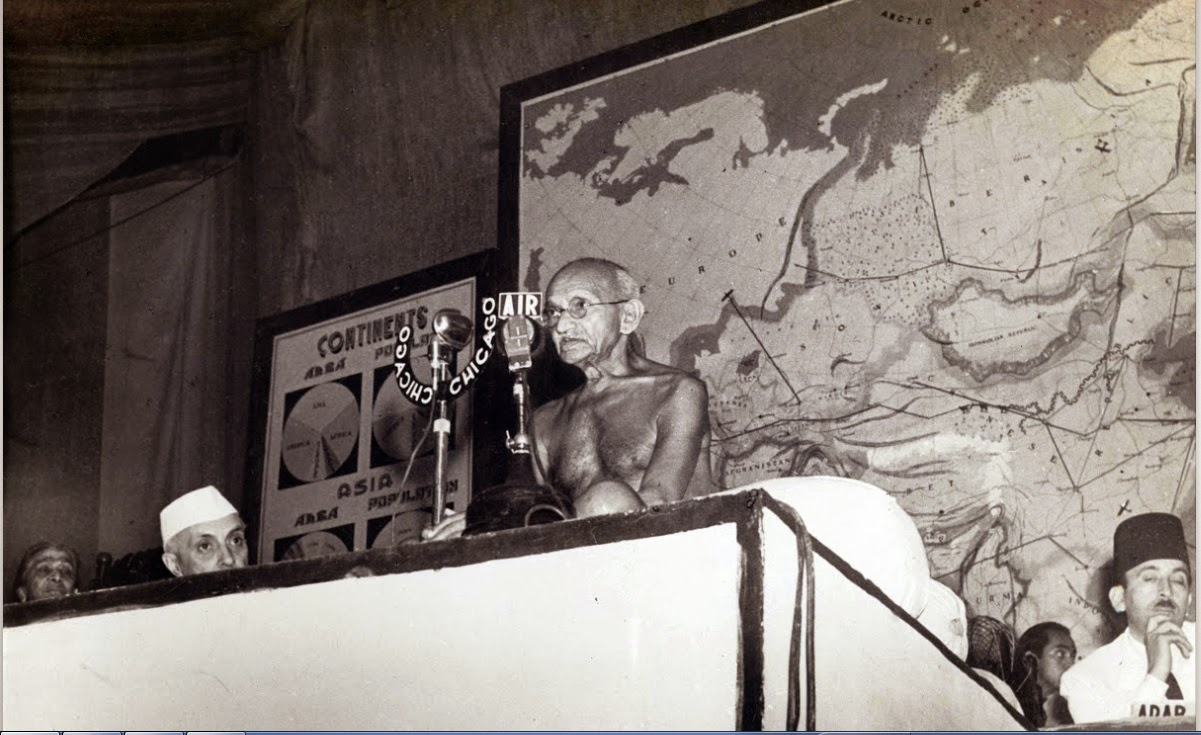
Gandhi at the Asian Relations Conference in 1947

In 1947, the end of colonial rule in India was in sight. The partition of India would occur four and a half months later, and several communal riots broke out in March.

India fielded the largest delegation with 52 delegates and 6 observers. Guests invited by India included Christoph von Fürer-Haimendorf. During the opening of the conference, Mahatma Gandhi was visiting villages in an attempt to quell riots and violence. Nehru, in his opening speech, noted that Gandhi was "engrossed in the service of the common man in India, and even this Conference could not drag him away from it." However, Gandhi was able to attend on 1–2 April after he was urgently summoned for a meeting with Mountbatten in Delhi. He addressed the communal riots in his closing speech, calling them "a shameful thing and it is an exhibition which I would like you not to carry to your respective countries but bury here."

During discussion on "National Movements for Freedom", India faced some criticism regarding the presence of Indian troops in the British colonial subjugation of Burma, Ceylon, Malaya and Indonesia. North Vietnam pointed out that French planes were still allowed to refuel in Indian bases. Nehru argued that only French hospital planes were allowed to be refuelled in India, that his government had begun withdrawing troops from Indonesia and affirmed that "no Asian country should give any direct or indirect assistance to any colonial power in its attempts to keep any Asian country in subjection." When confronted about the issue of Indian immigrants and their dual citizenships in Southeast Asia, the Indian delegates showed "indifference" and implied that the immigrants' "right to return" could be revoked.

One goal of the conference, though denied by Nehru, was to propel India to be the leader of new Asia. In the opening speech, Nehru stated that "it is fitting that India should play her part in this new phase of Asian Development... She is the natural centre and focal point of the many forces at work in Asia."

=== Jewish delegation, Egypt and Arab League ===
Mandatory Palestine was represented by the Jewish community from the Hebrew University of Jerusalem. The delegation was led by Professor Hugo Bergmann, and notable delegates included David Hacohen. There was no representation for Palestinian Arabs, though Egypt and observers from the Arab League would come to defend Palestinian interests and disputed some statements made by the Jewish delegation. The Egyptian team was led by one of its observers, Abdul Wahab Azzam Bey.

When Bergmann referred to Palestine as the holy land for his community, Karima El-Said of Egypt sought to respond. Nehru remarked that "we have tried to avoid, for obvious reasons, raising and discussing controversial issues at this Conference... but some reference was made... I think it only right that she should have a chance." In her response, El-Said stated that "we strongly object to any settlement in Palestine except for the Arabs... The Arabs must live in Palestine. Palestine cannot belong any more to its original inhabitants." The Jewish delegation's request to respond was refused by the chairman, and as a result they walked out of the conference, though they were later persuaded by Shanti Swaroop Bhatnagar to return and shake hands with the Arab delegates. In the closing speech of that session, Nehru said the "question of Palestine itself will be settled in co-operation between them and not by any appeal to or reliance upon any outsider." The Arab League observer Takieddin el-Solh followed with a speech rebutting the Jewish delegates. On the next day, the observer from Egypt Abdul Ahab Azzam issued a signed statement against the Jewish delegation. Mostafa Momen of Egypt also organised a press conference, where he denounced the inclusion of Jewish representatives from European nations representing Palestine.

=== Soviet republics ===
Soviet republics participating in the conference included Armenia, Azerbaijan, Georgia, Kazakhstan and Uzbekistan, who sent separate delegates. Kirghizia and Turkmenistan arrived late, landing in Delhi one day after the closing plenary. They praised the Soviet system, and tried to demonstrate how it had helped them overcome the many problems faced by the countries in the conference. They claimed that "no strikes occurred in the Soviet Union... because industry belongs to society as a whole." Kazakhstan promoted her democratic and agricultural reforms, and together with Uzbekistan reported their achievements in education after it was made free and compulsory. The Georgian delegation was led by Victor Kupradze, who headed one session of the Round Table on "Cultural Problems." The country promoted her scientific and culture progress since the Russian Revolution in 1917.

US observers commented that "upon request they gladly told of the achievements of their respective governments but their complacency precluded any admission of even the existence of such problems as were plaguing other countries of Asia" and, according to diplomat G. H. Jansen, "in consequence, the report is full of flattering references to the Soviet republics."

=== Other nations ===
==== Afghanistan ====
The delegation from the Kingdom of Afghanistan was led by Dr. Abdul Majid Khan, President of Kabul University, who headed one session of the Round Table on "Cultural Problems".

==== Bhutan ====
Bhutan sent two observers, Jigme Palden Dorji and Rani C. Dorji, but no delegates.

==== Burma ====
Burma was, at the time of the conference, undergoing the 1947 Burmese general election, and Aung San did not attend due to his campaign. The Burmese delegation was led by Justice Kyaw Myint of the Rangoon High Court. Notable delegates included Htin Aung, Hla Myint, Thein Han, Tha Hla, Ba Lwin, M. A. Rashid and Mya Sein, while notable observers included Thakin Mya and Chan Htoon.

The Burmese resistance to British was discussed, with the Philippines proposing "a policy of peaceful resistance" for the country, which Daw Saw Inn rejected, stating "the Burmese are a nation of fighters." The Burmese delegation, along with Ceylon and Malaya, also raised the issue of Chinese and Indian immigrants in their countries.

==== Ceylon ====
The Ceylon delegation was led by S. W. R. D. Bandaranaike, who also headed the Round Table for Transition from Colonial to National Economy. Notable delegates included C. W. W. Kannangara, Justin Samarasekera, Cissy Cooray and E. M. V. Naganathan, while notable observers included George E. de Silva, Anil de Silva and E. W. Kannangara. Bandaranaike proposed the formation of an Asian economic bloc, though it was opposed by Southeast Asian nations such as Indonesia, Malaya and Vietnam, who cautioned against a repeat of Japanese Pan-Asianism. The Ceylonese delegation, along with Burma and Malaya, also raised the issue of Chinese and Indian immigrants in their countries.

==== Indonesia ====
Indonesia had recently gained recognition from Dutch rule, and negotiated for trade and diplomatic relations during the conference. The Indonesian delegation was led by Dr. Abu Hanifa. Other notable delegates included Siauw Giok Tjhan and Ali Sastroamidjojo, and observers included Agus Salim and Mochtar Lubis. Prime Minister of Indonesia Sutan Sjahrir missed the opening session as he was signing an agreement with the Dutch, but was later brought in an Indian plane chartered for him by Nehru's government that allowed him to arrive in time for the closing ceremony.

==== Iran ====
The Iranian delegation was led by Gholam Hossein Sadighi. Notable delegates included Mehdi Bayani and Safiyeh Firous, who headed one session of the Round Table on "Status of Women and Women's Movement". Ali-Asghar Hekmat served as one of the three observers.

==== Korea ====
Korea was represented by delegates from the Republic of Korea (South). It had recently become independent from Japanese rule. The delegation, missing a flight in Shanghai, arrived on the last day, and was led by Dr. Lark Geoon Paik of the Chosun Christian University. During the discussion on "National Movements for Freedom", Korean delegates raised the issue regarding its occupation by Allied forces. They stated that, despite the promises of freedom and independence by the Cairo Declaration, "what the Koreans got was Allied occupation and a division of the country into two."

==== Malaya ====
The Malayan Union delegation was led by Dr. Burhanuddin al-Helmy and included John Thivy, Abdullah CD, E. E. C. Thuraisingham, P. P. Narayanan, S. A. Ganapathy and Philip Hoalim, who headed the Round Table on "National Movements for Freedom". Thivy proposed the idea of a "neutrality bloc" that will not provide manpower or resources to colonial powers, though this was not adopted. The Malay delegation, along with Ceylon and Burma, also raised the issue of Chinese and Indian immigrants in their countries.

==== Mongolia ====
The Mongolian People's Republic had recently had its independence recognised by the Republic of China. The delegation took a detour to Moscow to pick up Russian interpreter, who was to be their only contact with the other delegates. They arrived on the last day of the conference, and was led by Lubsan Vandan of the Committee of Sciences.

==== Nepal ====
The Kingdom of Nepal sent 5 delegates. Its leader, Major-General Bijaya Shumshere Jung Bahadur Rana, headed the discussions on "Agricultural Reconstruction and Industrial Development". Another notable Nepalese delegate was Surya Prasad Upadhyaya.

==== Philippines ====
The Philippines, which had recently become independent, sent a delegation led by Anastacio de Castro. De Castro denounced American imperialism during the conference. Other delegates included Paz Policarpio Mendez, who headed one session of the Round Table on "Status of Women and Women's Movement".

==== Siam ====
The 2-member Siamese delegation was led by Phraya Anuman Rajadhon, who headed one session of the Round Table on "Cultural Problems", along with Sukich Nimmanheminda.

==== Turkey ====
Turkey only sent one observer, H. Kocaman, who was the Turkish Vice-Consul in India.

=== Observers ===
The Arab League, United Nations, Australia, the United Kingdom, the United States and the Soviet Union sent observers.

The Arab League observer was Takieddin el-Solh, and the United Nations observer was Kamal Kumar of the United Nations Information Centre in New Delhi.

Australia sent Gerald Parker of the Australian Institute of International Affairs and John McCallum of the Australian Institute of Political Science as observers. According to McCallum, Australia "adhered strictly to listener."

The United Kingdom observers included V. K. Krishna Menon of the India Institute, along with W. W. Russell and Nicholas Mansergh of the Royal Institute of International Affairs. The United States sent observers from the Institute of Pacific Relations, which included Virginia Thompson, Richard Adloff and Phillips Talbot.

The Soviet Union sent observers from the Institute of Pacific Relations, which included E. M. Zhukov and T. P. Plyshevski. One delegate, writing about the Soviet observers, stated that "it is hard to get to know them. They have come here and seem interested in discussions. But, except for cultural topics, they regularly tell us they have already solved all problems that are facing the rest of us and conversation stops there."

== Result ==
The Asian Relations Organization (ARO) was established as a result of the conference. A provisional council of 30 members elected Nehru its president. B. Shiva Rao and Han Lih-wu of China were made the ARO's general secretaries. The following goals were laid out:

1. To promote the study and understanding of Asian problems and relations in their Asian and world aspects
2. To foster friendly relations and co-operation among the peoples of Asia and between them and the rest of the world
3. To further the progress and well-being of the peoples of Asia

Most nations were not enthusiastic about the ARO, as they feared that it would allow India or China to exert influence over them. This led to the delegates of some Southeast Asian nations to visit Aung San in Rangoon immediately after the conference to discuss the formation of a Southeast Asian organisation. The ARO was closed in 1955 as there was "little work for the Organisation", and merged back into the ICWA.

At the closing session, Nehru announced that "an academic institute should be set up in the capital of each Asian country with a view to studying the history and culture of Asia," though this plan never came into being.

The second Asian Relations Conference was to be held in Nanking, China in April, 1949. As the Chinese Civil War intensified in 1948, the Philippines offered to host the conference instead. The second conference was held in Baguio, Philippines in May 1950, though participation was limited to India, Pakistan, Ceylon, Thailand, New Zealand, Australia and the Philippines. Nehru, attempting to keep the conference non-political, dismissed the idea of a proposed Asian Regional Organisation and military cooperation between the Philippines and Australia.

Western reactions focused on Asia's future role on the world stage, in particular that of India and China. A British observer wrote that "even though the Conference may not decisively influence the course of events in Asia, it was the outward and visible sign of Asia's new importance in world affairs." Western observers also criticized what they saw as India's imperial ambitions displayed during the conference.

== List of participants ==
The official list of participants names 231 people who were distributed among the following countries (number of delegates / number of observers):

1. Afghanistan (5/2)
2. (Armenian Soviet Socialist Republic) Armenia (2/0)
3. (Azerbaijan Soviet Socialist Republic) Azerbaijan (2/0)
4. Bhutan (0/2)
5. (Myanmar) Burma (15/4)
6. (French Cochinchina) (Kingdom of Laos) Cambodia, Cochin China and Laos (3/0)
7. (Dominion of Ceylon) Ceylon (13/5)
8. China (8/1)
9. Egypt (3/2)
10. (Georgian Soviet Socialist Republic) Georgia (2/0)
11. (British Raj) India (49/6)
12. Indonesia (15/6)
13. Iran (3/3)
14. (Kazakh Soviet Socialist Republic) Kazakhstan (2/0)
15. (Kirghiz Soviet Socialist Republic) Kirghizia (1/0)
16. (South Korea) Korea (3/0)
17. (Malayan Union) Malaya (14/0)
18. Mongolia (2/1)
19. Nepal (5/3)
20. Palestine Jewish Delegation (10/0)
21. Philippines (6/0)
22. (Thailand) Siam (2/2)
23. (Tajik Soviet Socialist Republic) Tajikistan (2/0)
24. Tibet (4/0)
25. Turkey (0/1)
26. (Turkmen Soviet Socialist Republic) Turkmenistan (1/0)
27. (Uzbek Soviet Socialist Republic) Uzbekistan (2/0)
28. Vietnam (3/0)

The following states and organizations sent observers only:

- Australia (0/2)
- Arab League (0/1)
- United Kingdom (0/3)
- Soviet Union (0/2)
- United States (0/3)
- United Nations (0/1)

== See also ==
- Congress of the Peoples of the East
- Pan-Asianism
- Asian–African Conference
