= Tibet flag case =

The Tibet flag case (Danish: Tibetsagen, pronounced [tsʰiˈpe̝ˀtˌsɛˀjn̩]) concerns police action taken in relation to two demonstrations in Copenhagen, Denmark, in 2012 and 2013 against former Chinese Communist Party general secretary Hu Jintao's state visit. It is named after the confiscation or concealment of Tibetan flags that were used as part of the demonstrations.

== Chronology ==
Flag of Tibet

On 15 June 2012, Chinese Communist Party general secretary Hu Jintao visited Copenhagen, eliciting demonstrations against Chinese dominion over Tibet, in which the Tibetan flag was displayed. In that context, several protesters were detained or had their flags confiscated. Years later, in 2015, the existence of an order within the Copenhagen police to "shield the Chinese president from protesters" was brought into public light.

In June 2013, when another high-ranking Chinese politician Yu Zhengsheng visited, protesters once again displayed the Tibetan flag, and were blocked from the view of Yu and his entourage.

An official in the Ministry of Justice was persuaded on 30 July 2013 to cease her investigation of the events of the 2013 demonstration on the grounds that it might harm the Minister of Justice Morten Bødskov.

The Danish Chairman of the Support Committee for Tibet organization, Anders Højmark, said in an article on 20 December 2014, "It is disappointing that the government will not meet with the Tibetan Buddhist leader Dalai Lama when he visits Denmark in February next year".

In the autumn of 2015, Minister of Justice Søren Pind proclaimed the formation of a commission (colloquially, Tibetkommissionen) to investigate the events of the 2012 demonstration.

In 2018, it was reported that "Anders Højmark Andersen, chairman of the Tibet Support Committee, is pleased to note that the Copenhagen Police believe that up to 200 people can claim compensation in the Tibetan case. (...) is stated in a document from the Minister of Justice Søren Pape Poulsen (...) Andersen is one of the eight people who were awarded compensation of DKK 20,000 in the case earlier in April."

== See also ==
- China-Denmark relations
