= Snow Lion =

Mythical Tibetan creature

Snow Lion as depicted in the Emblem of Tibet.

The Snow Lion (sometimes spelled snowlion; Tibetan: གངས་སེང་གེ་, Wylie: gangs seng ge; Chinese: 雪獅) is a celestial animal of Tibet. It is the emblem of Tibet, representing the snowy mountain ranges and glaciers of Tibet, and may also symbolize power and strength, and fearlessness and joy, east and the earth element. It is one of the Four Dignities. It ranges over the mountains, and is commonly pictured as being white with a turquoise mane. In Journey to the West published in 1592, Snow Lion is depicted as one of the monster-spirits.

== As national emblem of Tibet ==
The flag of Tibet, in use in Tibet from 1916 to 1950. It features two Snow Lions amongst other elements and is still used by the Tibetan Government-in-Exile. Its use is outlawed in the People's Republic of China.

The emblem of Tibet, adopted by 1947.

From 1909 until 1959, a single snow lion or a pair of them was used as the national emblem of Tibet on coins, postage stamps, banknotes and the national flag of Tibet. The version shown on right with two Snow Lions was introduced by the 13th Dalai Lama in 1912 based on old military banners, and is still used by the Government of Tibet in Exile. The flag is popularly known as the Snow Lion Flag (gangs seng dar cha).

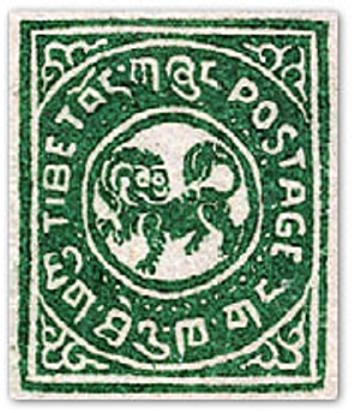
1912 Tibetan stamp with snowlion

== In Tibetan culture ==
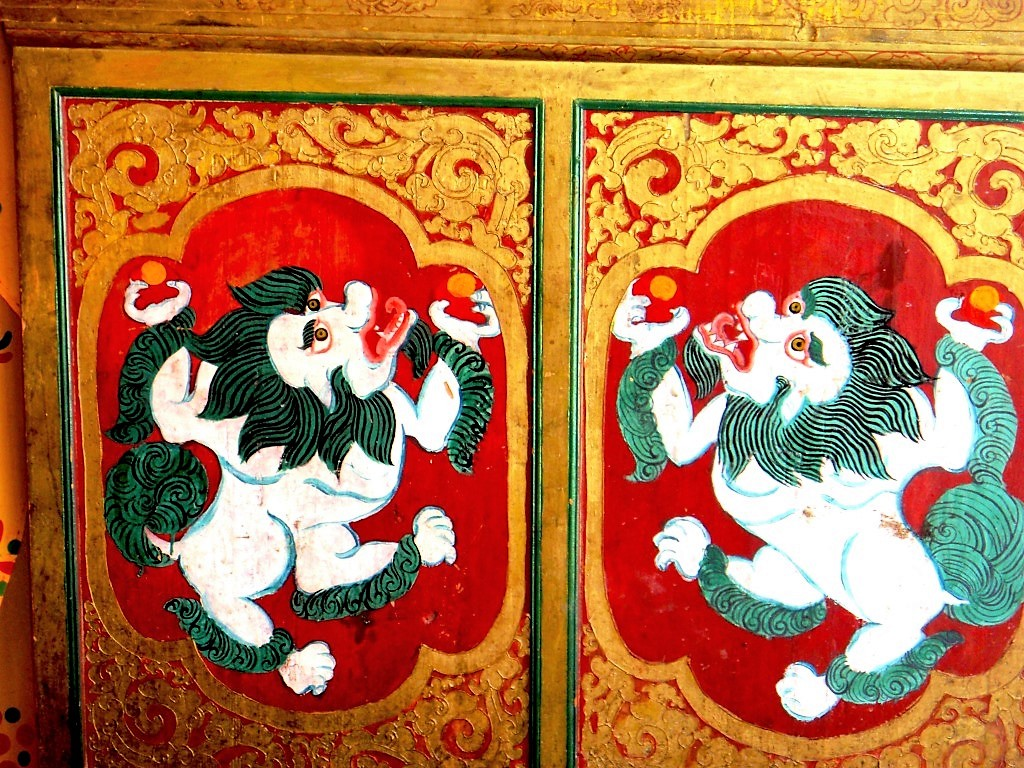
Snow Lions decorating a cupboard

Snow lion is frequently mentioned in Tibetan folk songs and proverbs. It is thought to live in the highest mountains as it is the "king of beasts" that would tower over other animals of the lower levels. Snow lions may also represent hermits and yogis who live high up in the mountains. Marpa was called to interpret the meaning when, "Tibet's great yogin, Milarepa, once had a prophetic dream which included a snow lion."

=== Snow Lioness milk ===
In Tibetan lore, two Tibetan culture heroes, Gesar and Milarepa, were said to have been raised by snow lioness. The milk of the Snow Lioness (Tibetan: Gangs Sengemo) is reputed to contain special nutrients to heal the body and restore it to harmony. Some holy medicinal remedies are believed to contain the essence of Snow Lioness milk. Her milk is also used to symbolise the Dharma and its purity, as Milarepa replies to a man seeking to buy the Dharma from him with expensive gifts:

"I, the snow lioness who stays in snowy solitudes, Have milk which is like the essential nectar. In the absence of golden cups, I would not pour it in an ordinary vessel."

Legend has it that the lioness produces milk from its paws, and the milk may pass into hollow balls given to the lioness to play with. This ball may be represented in Tibetan art as a three-coloured "wheel of joy" (dga' 'khyil).

=== Snow Lion dance ===
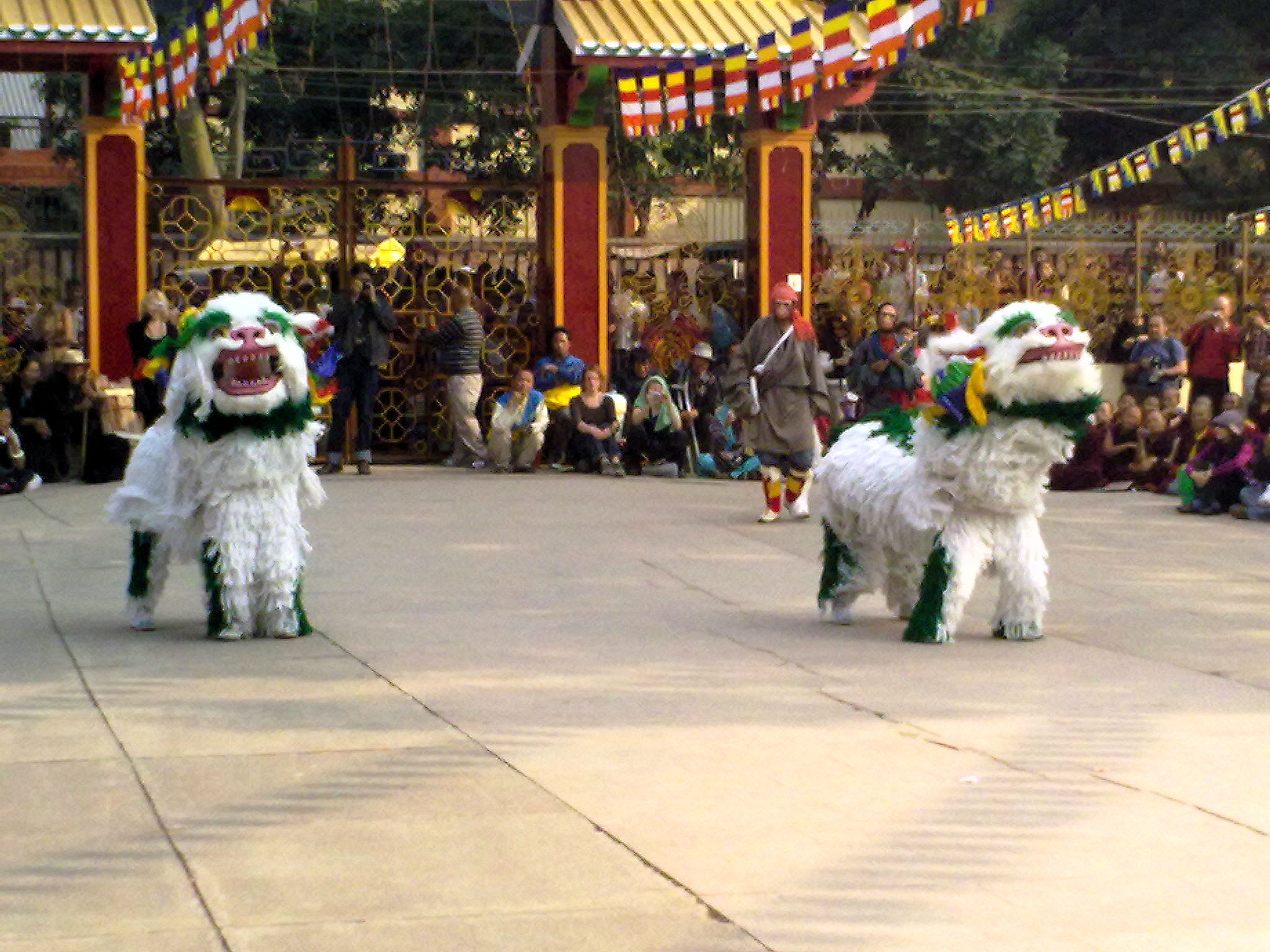
Tibetan Snow Lion Dance, Bodhgaya, India

A form of lion dance found in the Tibetan areas is called the snow lion dance or Senggeh Garcham. The name seng ge and its related forms come from Sanskrit siṅha, and cham or garcham is a Buddhist ritual dance. The snow lion dance may be performed as a secular dance, or as a ritual dance performed by bon po monks. This dance may also be found among people in other Himalayan regions such as the Monpa people in Arunachal Pradesh, and in Sikkim where it is called Singhi Chham.

== In Buddhist art ==
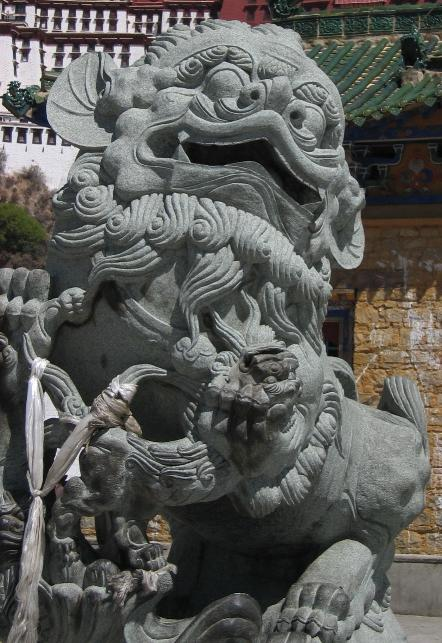
Chinese stone lion at guard the entrance to the Potala Palace

The lion was adopted as a symbol of Shakyamuni Buddha in early Buddhism; it is also depicted as a vehicle for a number of Vajrayana deities such as Vaishravana and Manjushri, and the lion throne may be found in many nirmanakaya Buddha forms. The lion in India art is represented in Tibetan Buddhist art as the Snow Lion. The Snow Lion is the protector of Buddha and in paintings and sculpture is usually seen as holding up the Buddha's throne (one on the left and one on the right of the throne.) The throne of a Buddha may also be depicted with eight Snow Lions representing the 8 main Bodhisattvas of Buddha Shakyamuni.

The body of the Snow Lion is white while its flowing hair of mane, tail and curls on legs, is either blue or green. While most Snow Lions are gender neutral in Buddhist art there are some that are represented as obviously male and some as obviously female. When represented as a symmetrical pair the male is on the left and the female on the right. Sculptural Snow Lions are often in repousse metal that has been gilt and painted.

== Attributes ==
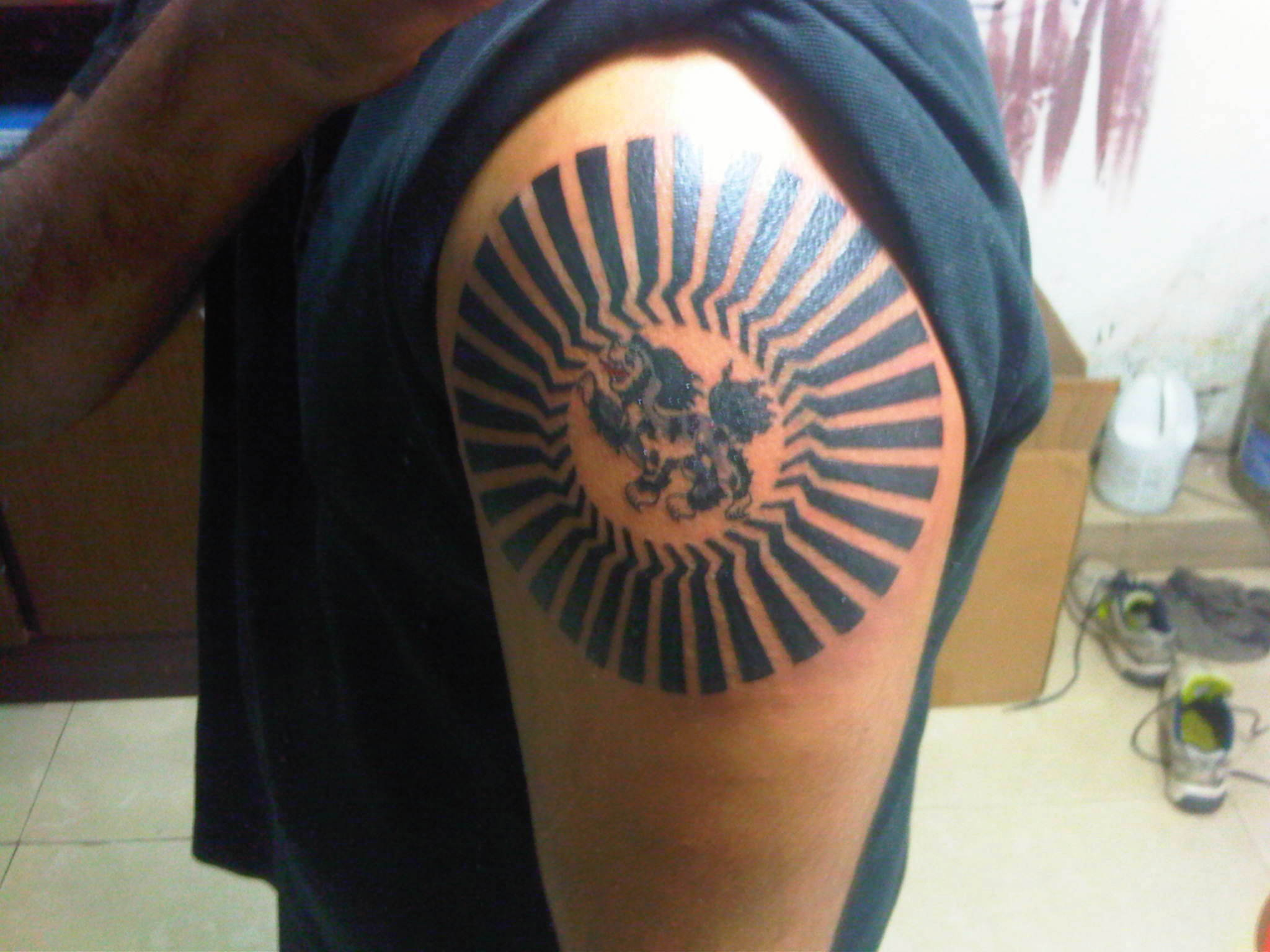
A Snow Lion tattoo

Snow Lion insignia of the Special Frontier Force

The Snow Lion is a tulku or personification of the primordial playfulness of ananda "joy, bliss" (Wylie: dga'), comparable to the western unicorn. Though paradoxical, the Snow Lion does not fly but their feet never touch the ground; their existence is a playful continuum (Wylie: rgyud) of leaping from mountain peak to mountain peak. The energetic potency (wisdom or shakti) of the Snow Lion is expressed in the attribute of the gankyil or "ananda-wheel" the Snow Lion keep in eternal play. The gankyil is the principal polyvalent symbol and teaching tool of all the doctrinal trinities of Dzogchen and is the energetic signature of the trikaya. The gankyil is the inner wheel of the Dharmacakra of the Ashtamangala path of Vajrayana Buddhism.

=== Roar ===
The roar of the Snow Lion embodies the sound of 'emptiness' (Sanskrit: Śūnyatā), courage and truth, and because of this is often a synonym for the Buddhadharma, the Buddha’s teachings, as it implies freedom from karma and the challenging call to awakening. It was considered to be so powerful that just a single roar could cause seven dragons to fall from the sky.

== Tibetan Lion Dog ==
The Shih Tzu, Lhasa Apso and Tibetan Terrier are also called the Lion Dog which may be due to their resemblance to the Snow Lion. However it is unknown whether the dogs were bred to resemble the Snow Lion or if the artistic depiction of the Snow Lion was influenced by the features of the dogs.

== See also ==
- Asiatic lion
- Ashtamangala
- Chinese guardian lions
- Lion § Colour_variation
- Pallas's cat
- Qilin
- Snow leopard
- Tibet
- Tibetan Buddhism
- Tibetan Terrier (breed of dog)
- White lion
