= Flag of Tibet =

Tibet
- Snow Lion Flag གངས་སེང་དར་ཆ
- Use: National flag
- Proportion: 5:8
- Adopted: 1916; 110 years ago
- Design: Two snow lions beneath a flaming blue, white and orange jewel and holding a blue and orange taijitu on a white mountain with a gold sun rising over it, all over 12 red and blue alternating rays with a gold border around the upper, lower, and hoist side of the flag.
- Use: Civil and state flag, national ensign
- Proportion: 5:8
- Design: Original design from 1916 to 1951

Snow Lion Flag

Tibetan name
- Tibetan: གངས་སེང་དར་ཆ
Transcriptions
- Wylie: Gangs seng dar cha
- THL: Gang seng dar cha
- Tibetan Pinyin: Angs êng tar qa
- Lhasa IPA: [kʰaŋ˩˧˨ seŋ˥˥ tʰaː(ɹ)˩˨ t͡ɕʰa˥˥]

The flag of the Central Tibetan Administration (བོད་ཀྱི་རྒྱལ་དར།), also unofficially known as the Snow Lion Flag (གངས་སེང་དར་ཆ), depicts:

- a white snow-covered mountain
- a yellow sun with red and dark blue rays emanating from it
- two Tibetan snow lions
- the Triratna symbol of coloured jewels enflamed between the upper paws of the lions
- a taijitu symbol between their lower paws
- a fimbriated yellow border around three of its four sides (not the fly side)

It was the national flag of an independent Tibet from 1916 until 1951, when the country was annexed by the People's Republic of China (PRC). The flag was adopted by the 13th Dalai Lama in 1916 and used until the Tibetan uprising of 1959, after which it was outlawed in the PRC. While the Tibetan flag remains illegal in the PRC-controlled Tibet Autonomous Region, it continues to be used by the Central Tibetan Administration, the Tibetan government-in-exile based in Dharamshala, Himachal Pradesh, India, and by pro-Tibet groups around the world to show support for human rights in Tibet and Tibetan independence.

== Symbolism ==
According to the Central Tibetan Administration, the Tibetan flag has the following symbolism:

- The lower central white triangle is a snow-clad mountain symbolises the highlands.
- The six red stripes existing atop a blue sky represent the six tribes who are the ancestors of the Tibetan people: the Se, Mu, Dong, Tong, Dru, and Ra.
- The yellow sun represents the equal enjoyment of freedom, spiritual and material happiness, and prosperity by all beings in Tibet.
- The pair of snow lions represent Tibet’s victorious accomplishment of a unified spiritual and secular life.
- The three coloured jewels held by the snow lions represent the three Buddhist values of the Triatna — three "supreme gems" — the objects of refuge:
1. The Buddha
2. Dharma
3. Sangha
- The two-coloured swirling jewel — the taijitu symbol — held between the two lions represents the people’s guarding and cherishing of the self-discipline of correct ethical behaviour.
- The flag’s yellow border symbolises that the teachings of the Buddha are flourishing and spreading.

== Design and early use ==
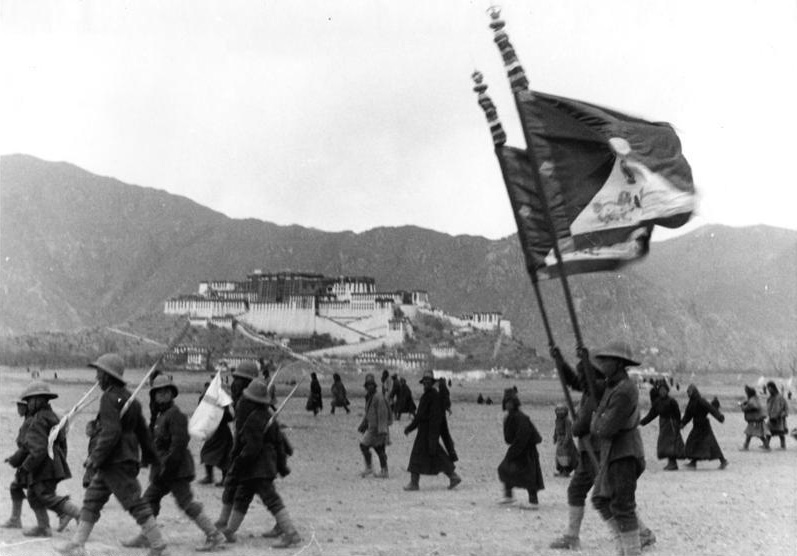
The Tibetan army waves the Tibetan flag at a military parade in Lhasa, 1938.

In February 1913, shortly after the fall of the Qing dynasty, the 13th Dalai Lama, Tibet's political and spiritual leader, declared independence from China and began modernising the Tibetan army. According to Tsarong Dasang Dadul, commander-in-chief of the modern Tibetan army, a new national flag was adopted by the Dalai Lama in 1916, and all army regiments were ordered to carry the flag in its present form. Gyalten Namgyal, tailor to both the 13th and 14th Dalai Lamas, wrote: "When I was fourteen, the Dalai Lama decided he wanted a Tibetan national flag made, and designed it himself. When a prototype was approved and the first flag commissioned, I was the one to execute the work."

In addition to being carried by Tibet's army, the flag was displayed on public buildings of the Ganden Phodrang government. Historical footage shows the flag flying at the foot of Potala Palace, the seat of the Dalai Lama in Tibet. The snow lion motif was also used on a flag seen by English diplomat, Sir Eric Teichman, flying above a Tibetan government building during hostilities between Sichuan and Tibet in 1917–1918: "Over the Kalon Lama’s residence ... floats the banner of Tibet, a yellow flag bearing a device like a lion in green, with a white snow mountain and a sun and moon in the corner."

Outside of Tibet, the flag was featured in publications by foreign governments, reference books, academic journals, and culturally significant works up until 1959. One of its first official international appearances was in a British Crown publication in 1923, "Drawings of the Flags in Use at the Present Time by Various Nations." It was also included in the German Ministry of Defense's Naval Command "Flaggenbuch" in 1926 and in the Italian Naval Ministry's "Raccolta delle Bandiere Fiamme e Insegne in uso presso le Diverse Nazioni" in 1934. National Geographic Magazine featured the flag in their 1934 “Flags of the World” edition. The caption reads: "Tibet.- With its towering mountain of snow, before which stand two lions fighting for a flaming gem, the flag of Tibet is one of the most distinctive of the East." Beginning in 1928, images of the flag were also widely published by companies in Europe, North America, South America, the Middle East, and Oceania in national flag collections on various forms of trading cards.

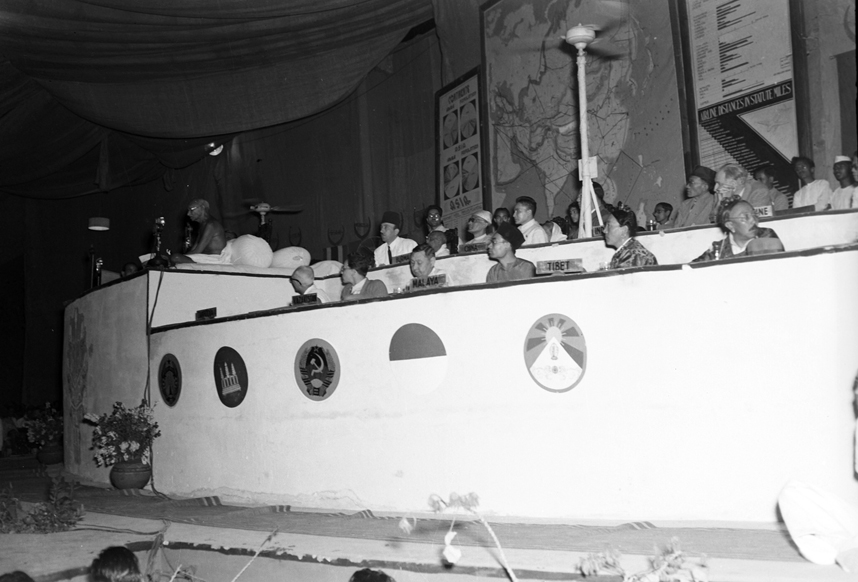
Two Tibetan delegates (front right) during the Asian Relations Conference in Delhi in 1947 as Mahatma Gandhi speaks (far left). A circular version of the Tibetan flag is seen in front of them, along with seals of other participating countries.

The flag's first appearance at an international gathering was in March–April 1947 at the Asian Relations Conference in New Delhi. The Conference, organised by Pandit Jawaharlal Nehru, hosted Asian states and anti-colonial movements. The representative of the government of British India in Lhasa, Hugh Richardson, personally shared the invitation from the Indian Council of World Affairs with the Tibetan Foreign Office, and advised the Conference was a good opportunity to show Asia and the world that Tibet was de facto independent. At the Conference, leaders of the 32 delegations sat on a daïs, each identified by a plate with their country’s name and their respective flags. American historian A. Tom Grunfeld asserts the Conference was not government-sponsored, so Tibet's presence and its flag had "no diplomatic significance", adding the flag was removed after representatives from the Republic of China protested to Conference organisers, who then issued a statement that Jawaharlal Nehru had invited the Tibetan delegates "in a personal capacity." A Tibetan delegate who was in attendance disputes this, and extant photos from the Conference show the flag displayed along with other participating countries' flags.

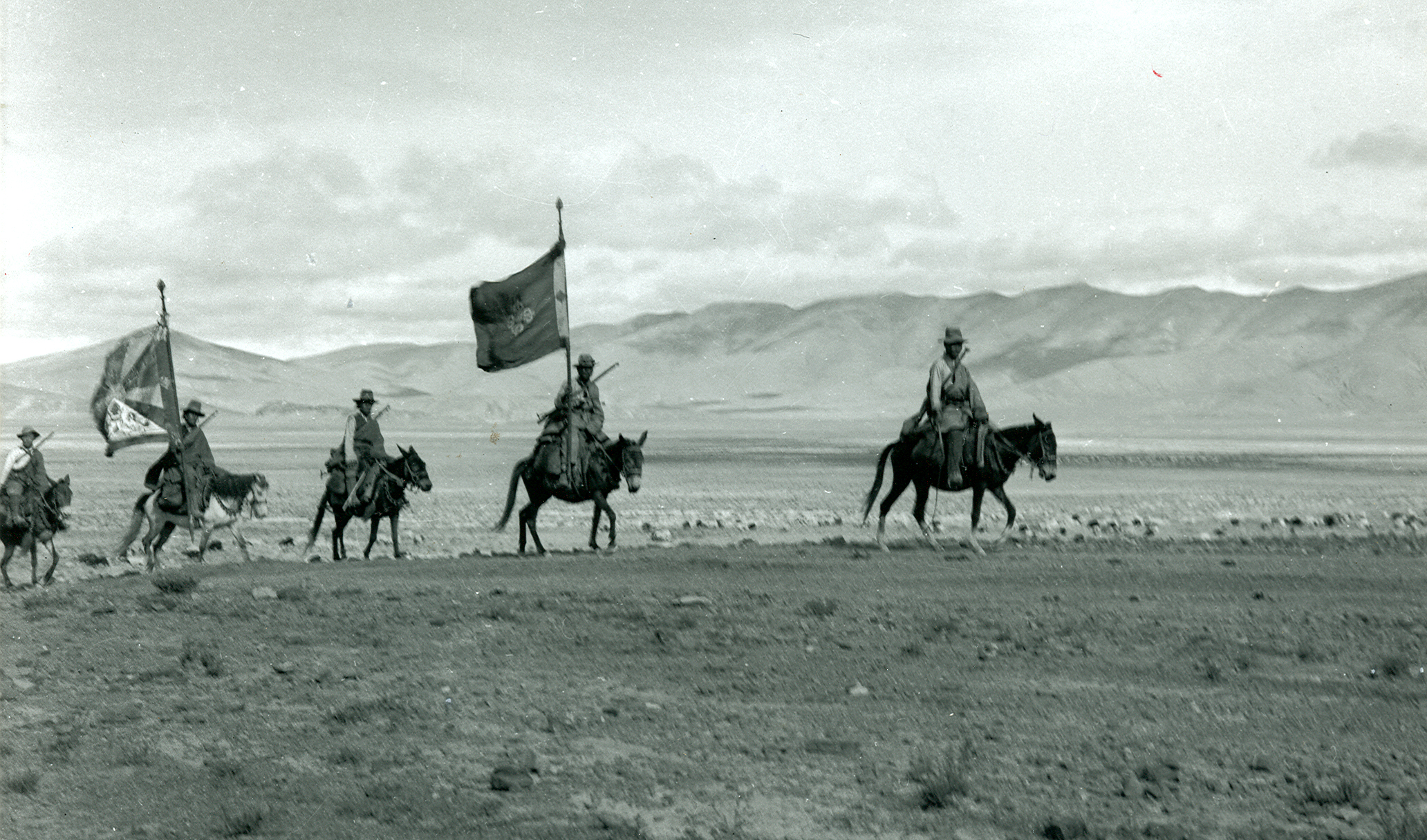
Tibetan flag in Tibet in the 1940s

After the People’s Liberation Army invaded Tibet and the 17-Point Agreement was signed, the flag continued to be used in the 1950s under the Chinese government, although its status was unclear. Many in the Chinese Communist Party usage of the flag indicated separatism, but the Tibetan local government of the day stressed the flag was an army flag (the Tibetan Army continued to exist parallel to People's Liberation Army infantries) and was not a national flag. Phuntso Wangye claims that Mao Zedong discussed the flag in a 1955 conversation with the 14th Dalai Lama. According to his story, Mao told the Dalai Lama that Zhang Jingwu, Zhang Guohua, and Fan Ming informed him Tibet had a "national flag". The Dalai Lama replied Tibet had an army flag, then Mao reportedly said "you may keep your national flag". There is no official recognition of this conversation by the Chinese government, however.

Prior to 1959, the flag continued to be recognised internationally as a national flag in reference books and by foreign governments. When the Dalai Lama visited the neighbouring Kingdom of Sikkim in 1956, the Tibetan flag was used by the Sikkimese government to welcome him. The flag can be seen in historic footage flying on the same flagpole with the flag of Sikkim at the Chogyal’s Tsuklakhang Palace, and on the Dalai Lama’s motorcade provided by the Sikkimese royal family.

American anthropologist Melvyn Goldstein argues that while the Tibetan flag was used by the army, few Tibetans in Tibet knew of it so when they wanted to protest against the Chinese government, they would instead use the flag of Chushi Gangdruk. Tibetan historian Jamyang Norbu has challenged this assertion, citing incidents of the Tibetan public’s regard for the flag as their national symbol.

== Pro-independence symbol ==
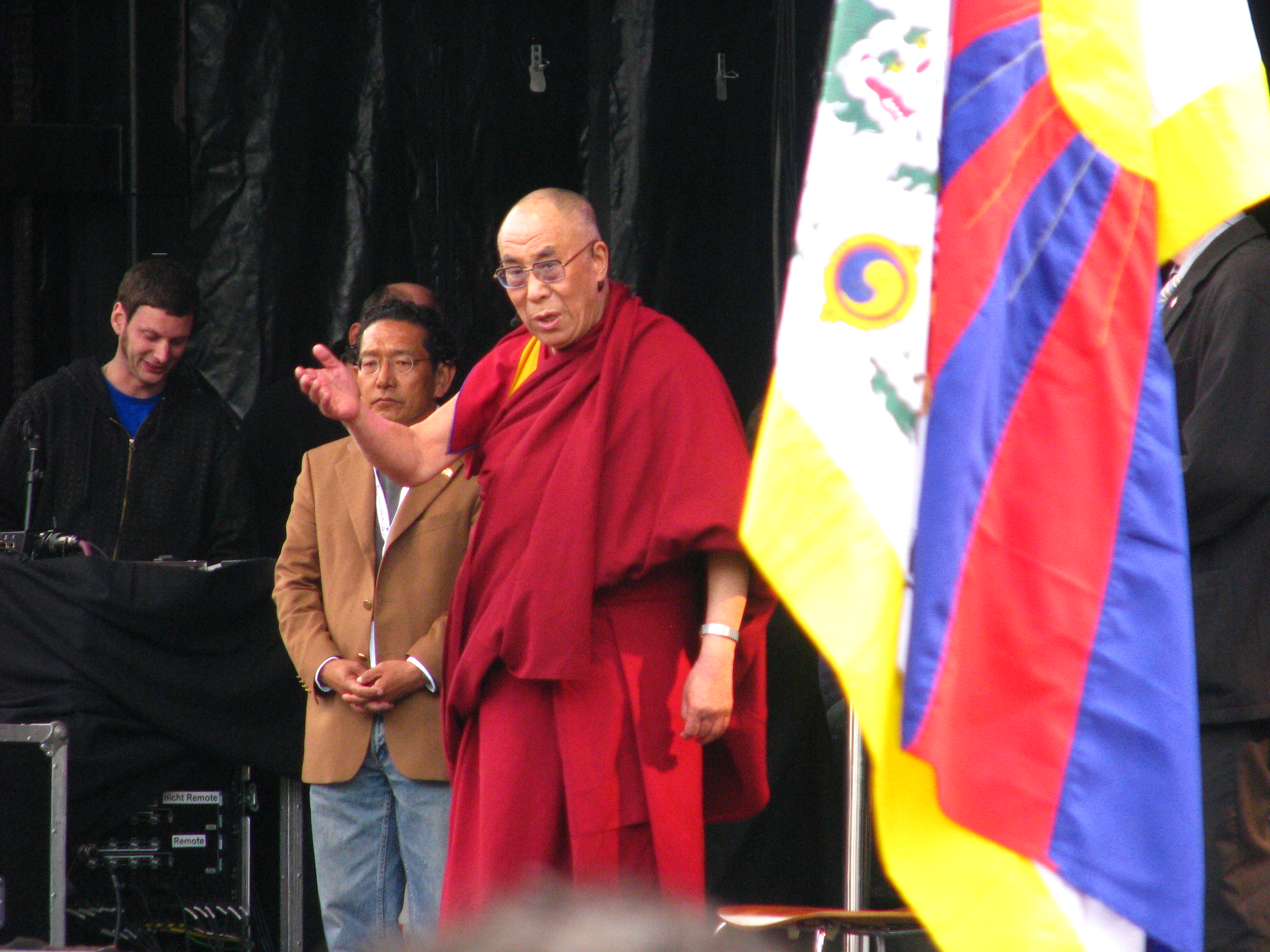
The 14th Dalai Lama with the Tibetan flag in Zürich, Switzerland 10 April 2010

After the 1959 Tibetan Uprising, the 14th Dalai Lama left his position as Ruler of Tibet, denounced the 17-Point Agreement with the PRC, and established the exile Central Tibetan Administration in India. As part of his project to inculcate pan-Tibetan nationalism (of all Tibetan people and not just those in his previous domain of the Tibet Autonomous Region), he standardised and adopted symbols as nationalist symbols, such as the Lhasa dialect of Tibetan, a Tibetan national anthem, and the flag. The flag is popularly known as the Snow Lion flag due to the presence of the two snow lions. The flag was adopted as a symbol of the Tibetan independence movement, and has become known as the "Free Tibet flag". Through the diaspora's and international protesters' use of the flag, it became known and used in protest by the Tibetan public. The flag is banned in mainland China.

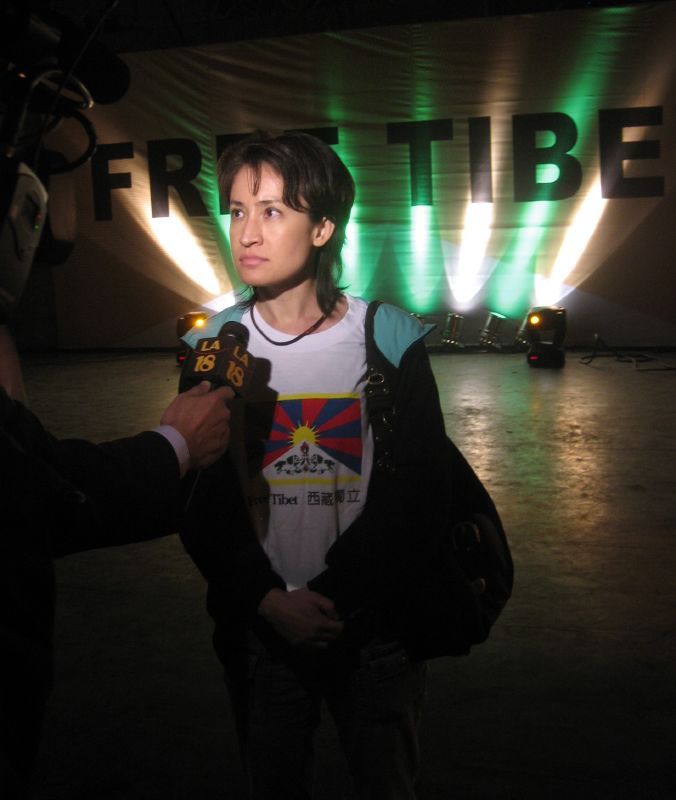
Hsiao Bi-khim, a Taiwanese politician from the DPP, wears a shirt featuring the Tibetan flag at a Free Tibet demonstration in 2008.

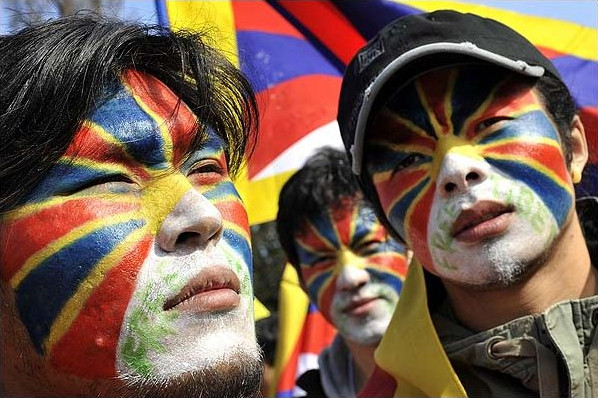
Tibetan flags painted on the faces of Tibetan demonstrators

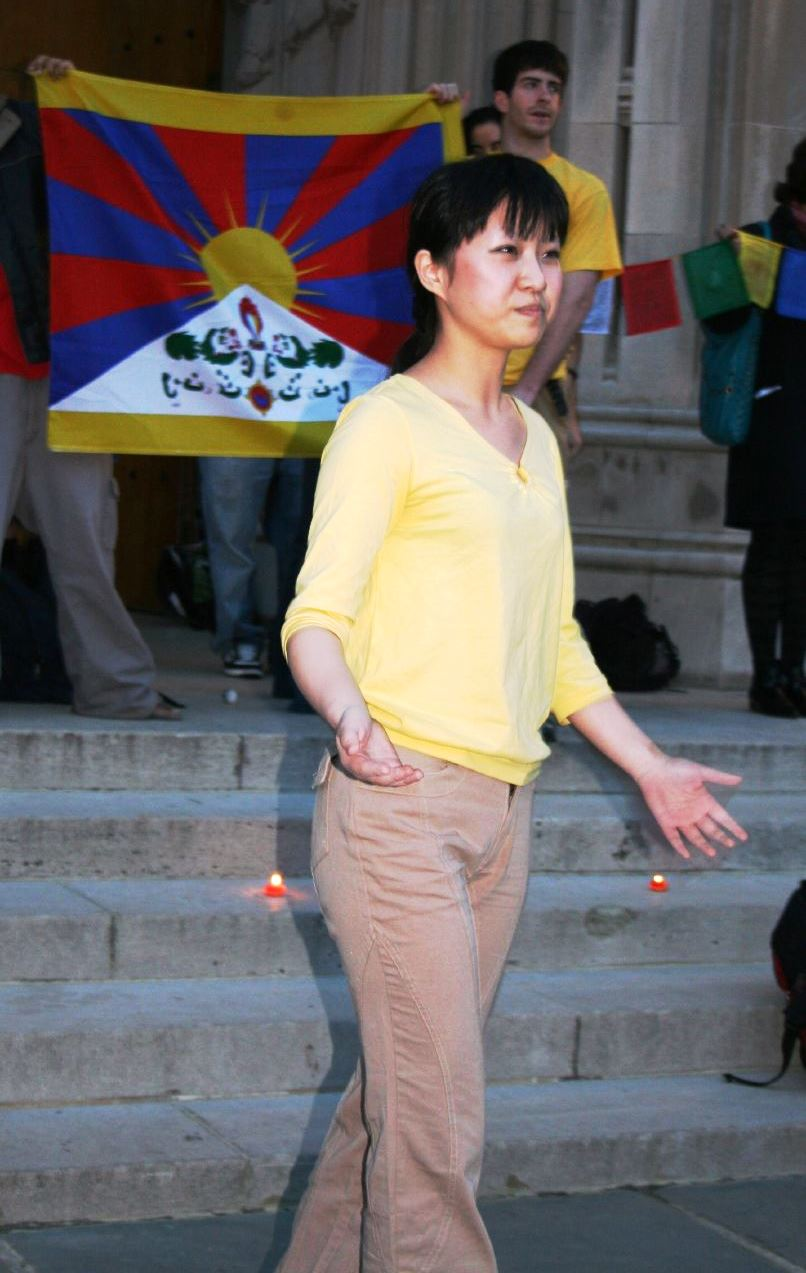
Duke University student Grace Wang Qianyuan during her speech on Free Tibet in 2008.

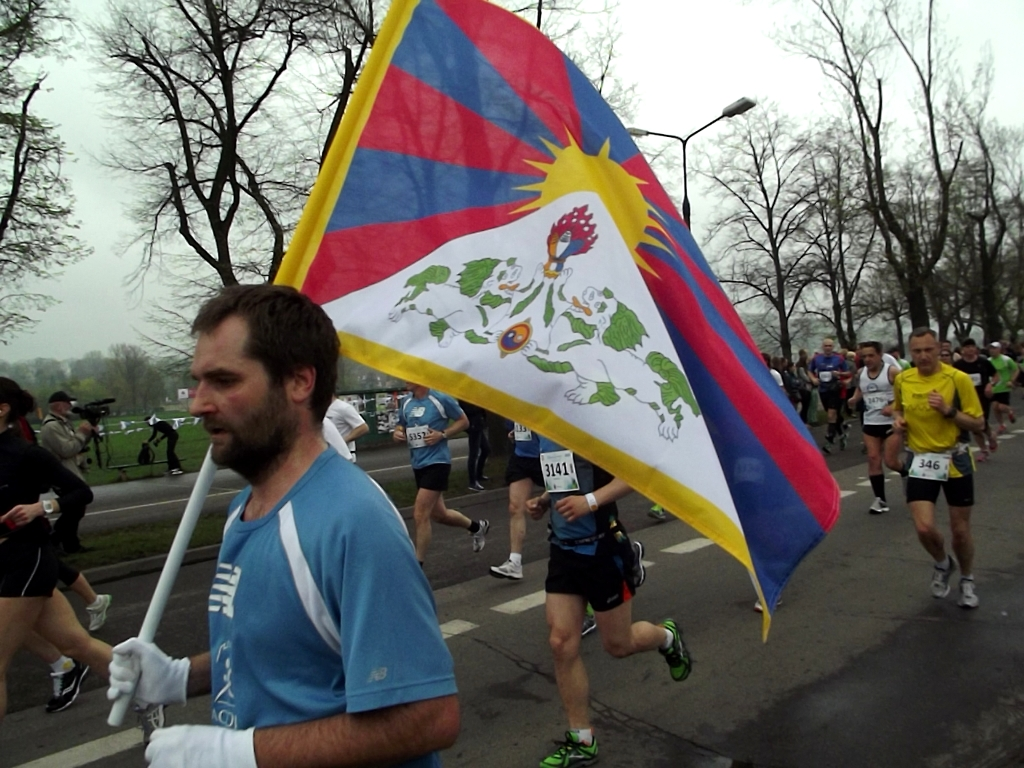
A Tibetan flag at the Cracovia Marathon, 2013

=== Flag emoji ===
The flag of Tibet does not have its own flag emoji. Tibetan activists unsuccessfully petitioned the Unicode Consortium for a Tibet flag emoji in 2019. Wired noted that Taiwan, where China's sovereignty is also challenged, has an emoji for its flag. However, Wired also noted that a Tibetan flag emoji may open a Pandora's box of similar requests from other unrecognised states and independence movements.

== Controversy ==
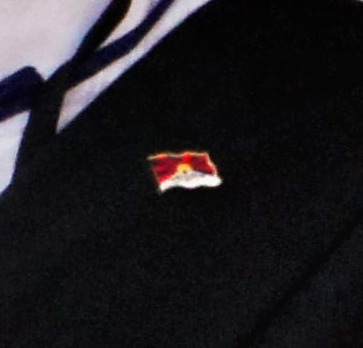
Snow lion flag pinned to Lobsang Sangay at the Europe for Tibet Solidarity Rally, Vienna, 2012

In 2012, Tibetan Prime Minister Lobsang Sangay was photographed with the flag of Tibet in Ladakh, India, prompting the Chinese government to issue a statement criticizing the public display of the flag. The Indian government had previously promised the Chinese government that it would not allow anti-China political activities by Tibetan exiles on Indian territory.

== See also ==
- Emblem of Tibet
- Tibetan Army
- Snow Lion
- Flag of East Turkestan
- Tibet flag case
