= Yi Yun Chen =

Chinese general and politician (1910–1969)

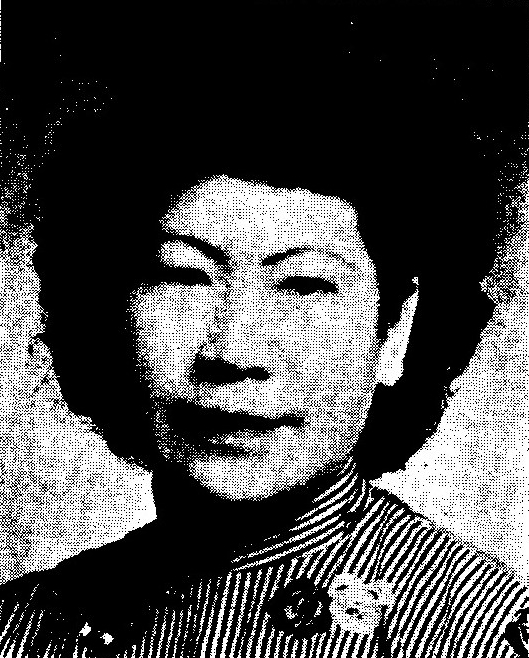

Member of the Legislative Yuan
- In office 1948–1969
- Constituency: Guangdong

Personal details
- Born: 1910 Dongguan, Guangdong, China
- Died: 29 June 1969 (aged 58–59) Seattle, United States

Yi Yun Chen (pinyin: Chén Yìyún; Jyutping: Can^{4} Jat^{6}-wan^{4}, 1910 – 29 June 1969) was a Chinese civil servant, army general and politician. She was among the first group of women elected to the Legislative Yuan in 1948.

== Biography ==
Chen was born in Guangdong. She became interested in politics at the age of 12 after hearing about the work of Sun Yat-sen. Having completed the four-year high school programme in a single year, she entered Sun Yat-sen University at the age of 16. She subsequently earned as master's degree in municipal government at the University of Michigan in the United States. Returning to China, Chen worked as a secretary in the national government, for Nanjing municipality and in the Ministry of Railways. She also taught in a police academy. A close associate of Soong Mei-ling, the wife of President Chiang Kai-Shek, during the Second Sino-Japanese War she served as a general, the only woman to hold the position on the front line. In 1944 she was a founder member of the National Women's Constitutional Society and served as its first head. In the 1948 parliamentary elections she was elected to the Legislative Yuan from a reserved seat for women in Guangdong.

After fleeing to Taiwan with the Republic of China government, Chen became president of the Chinese Women's Association. Around 1960, she returned to the United States, where she worked in Washington, D.C. and she met Chin Joe Lee. The couple married and moved to Seattle, where Chen ran the Mongolian Steak House restaurant. She was murdered on 29 July 1969 after leaving work with around $1,000 of takings. Attacked while walking between the restaurant and her car, she was killed by blow to the head and her body was discovered in a park several miles from the restaurant. Despite rewards of $2,000 and $10,000 being offered for information, no arrests were ever made.
