= Jiaoshi Yilin =

Jiaoshi Yilin (Chinese: 焦氏易林; pinyin: Jiāo shì Yì lín; lit. 'Forest of Changes of the Jiao Clan' (or just "Mr. Jiao's Many Thoughts on the Book of Changes") is a Chinese book of divination composed during the Western Han dynasty. Modeled on the I Ching, the work was attributed to Jiao Yanshou (焦延壽, see zh:焦贛), courtesy name Jiao Gan焦贛, who came from Liang 梁 (modern Shang Qiu 商丘, Henan) and was a tutor in the household of the Prince of Liang (early 1st century BCE). He was a scholar and official, reaching the rank of district magistrate in Xiao Huang 小黃 (near modern Kaifeng 开封, Henan). He was a student of the great Yi Jing scholar Meng Xi 孟喜 and passed on the traditions of his school to Jing Fang 京房. However, some scholars suspect that the book was composed later, perhaps in the late Western Han, perhaps even somewhat later. I am inclined to agree with those who attribute the book to Cui Zhuan (崔篆), a scholar and official who was active in the time of the Wang Mang interregnum (9 - 23 CE). Many of the verses seem oriented to the use of traveling merchants.

Yi Lin literally means a forest or grove of changes. The book consists of 4096 verses. The verses represent all the possible combinations of the sixty-four hexagrams of the Book of Changes (Yi Jing/I Ching), thus 64 X 64 = 4096. Many of the verses of the Yi Lin were apparently lost over time and only approximately 1500 verses are unique, with the remaining verses full or partial duplicates. The verses are most often two couplets of four characters each. Some verses are as short as three lines and some as long as eight. Many of the longer verses have orphaned couplets at the end that do not seem to fit with the first two couplets.

When divining using the Yi Jing, the figure may be unchanging (hexagram 50 remains 50, for example), or can have one or more moving lines which change it into another hexagram (16, third and fourth, lines changing, becomes 8). In this edition of the Forest of Changes, that would be described as 16 - 8, and the text is:

16 - 8

Even a ravenous tiger,

Will not eat a spiny hedgehog.

Yu the Great carved out the Dragon Gate.

Avoiding misfortune and eliminating calamity,

The people attain peace.

This verse has several typical elements of the Forest. For one, there is a bit of folk wisdom on tigers and hedgehogs. Then comes the reference to Yu the Great, tamer of floods and founder of the Xia dynasty. The verse uses an image from Chinese mythology in which Yu is supposed to have carved out a mountain as part of his herculean labors changing the flood pattern of China.

Later diviners made use of various techniques to determine one or both of the hexagrams for an Yi Lin reading. These often included drawing trigram images from the world around them and the events they were inquiring about and using a system to associate hexagrams with each hour. The Song dynasty Yi Jing scholar Shao Yong is said to have used the Forest of Changes as part of his system of Plum Blossom Numerology.

Dating the Text

The following items lend credence to at least portions of the text being written later than the lifetime of Jiao Yan Shou (1st century BCE), the purported author:

The Red Lord, mentioned in 28 - 34, is a mythological figure that became popular in the waning days of the Western Han, and is to be found in the so-called Han Apocrypha literature.

References to the Queen Mother of the West as a goddess to whom prayers for rescue are directed place the book at or near the end of the Western Han since an attitude toward her as a saving figure was not observed until that time (See Loewe, 1979).

At least one verse (45 - 42) points quite clearly to the story of Wang Zhao Jun. Most of the key events in her life were in the 30s BCE.

Although there have been many periods of flooding in China, one particularly heavy set of floods happened in 29 BCE. The large number of verses in the Forest about flood disasters lead me to believe it was written at a time when many floods were happening. Thus this is a very tenuous dating parameter, but it cannot be entirely excluded.

== Themes in the Forest ==
A somewhat subjective survey of the themes in the book produces this list:

- The wisdom and power of the ancient sage kings.
- The mandate of heaven and the rise and fall of dynasties.
- The events of the Zhou overthrow of the Shang and the parallels with the overthrow of the first dynasty, the Xia, overthrown by the Shang.
- The arc of dynastic history, from receiving the mandate and the glory days down to the descent into madness and perversion is often mentioned, along with the continuity, or lack thereof, of ancestral veneration for the ruler and state.
- The importance of both auspicious and inauspicious omens at the level of the state or empire;
- Confucian virtues such as filial piety, humility, and moral resilience. By this last term I mean the many occasions in which Confucian officials and those they admire in history stand up to rulers on matters of right and wrong and decisions that affect the safety of the state, as well as the habit of such officials to retire in times of bad governance and reemerge when a worthy ruler is on the throne.
- Reliance on omens, a practice particularly popular with the school of governance of scholars of the Gong Yang Commentary on the Spring and Autumn Annals during the Han dynasty.
- The cult of the Queen Mother of the West.
- Remembering and watching out for disasters in good times before they get a chance to develop; a concept found in the Book of Changes and elsewhere.
- Traveling merchants. A large number of texts are about business journeys, markets, transporting goods, obtaining profits, etc.
- Folk sayings and songs and folk beliefs and Daoist or Huang Lao schools.

== See also ==
- Wen Wang Gua
