= Yize =

Yize could be a transliteration of two different Chinese given names. Notable people with the name include:

- Ma Yize (Chinese: 马依泽; 921–1005), Song dynasty astronomer
- Wu Yize (Chinese: 吴宜泽; born 2003), Chinese snooker player
