= Religion in the Song dynasty =

State religions in China from 960 to 1279

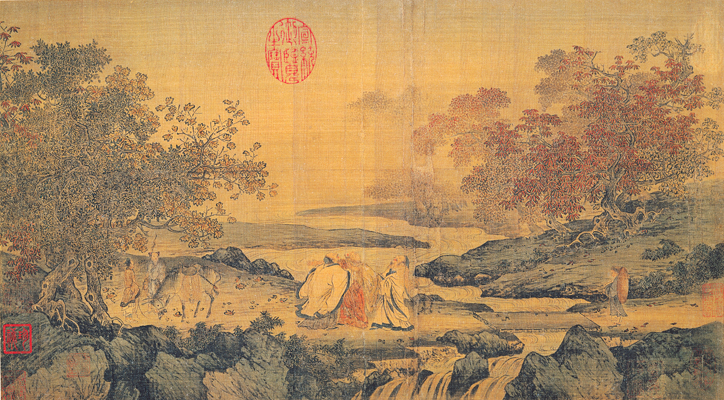
Confucianism, Taoism, and Buddhism are one, a painting in the litang style portraying three men laughing by a river stream, 12th century, Song dynasty.

Religion in the Song dynasty (960–1279) was primarily composed of three institutional religions: Confucianism, Taoism, and Buddhism, in addition to Chinese folk religion. The Song period saw the rise of Zhengyi Taoism as a state sponsored religion and a Confucian response to Taoism and Buddhism in the form of Neo-Confucianism. While Neo-Confucianism was initially treated as a heterodox teaching and proscribed, it later became the mainstream elite philosophy and the state orthodoxy in 1241.

== State religion ==
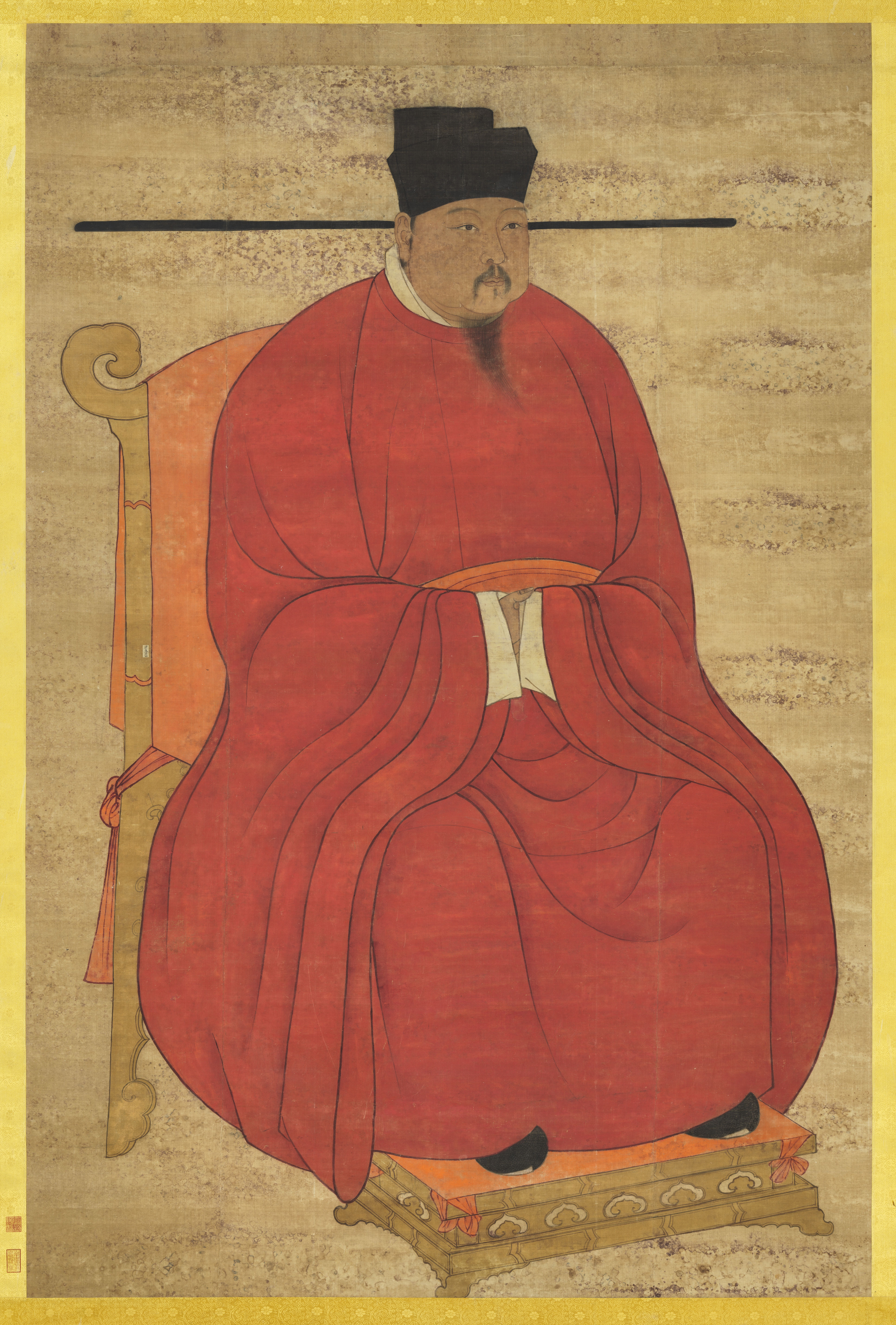
Emperor Zhenzong of Song (r. 997–1022)

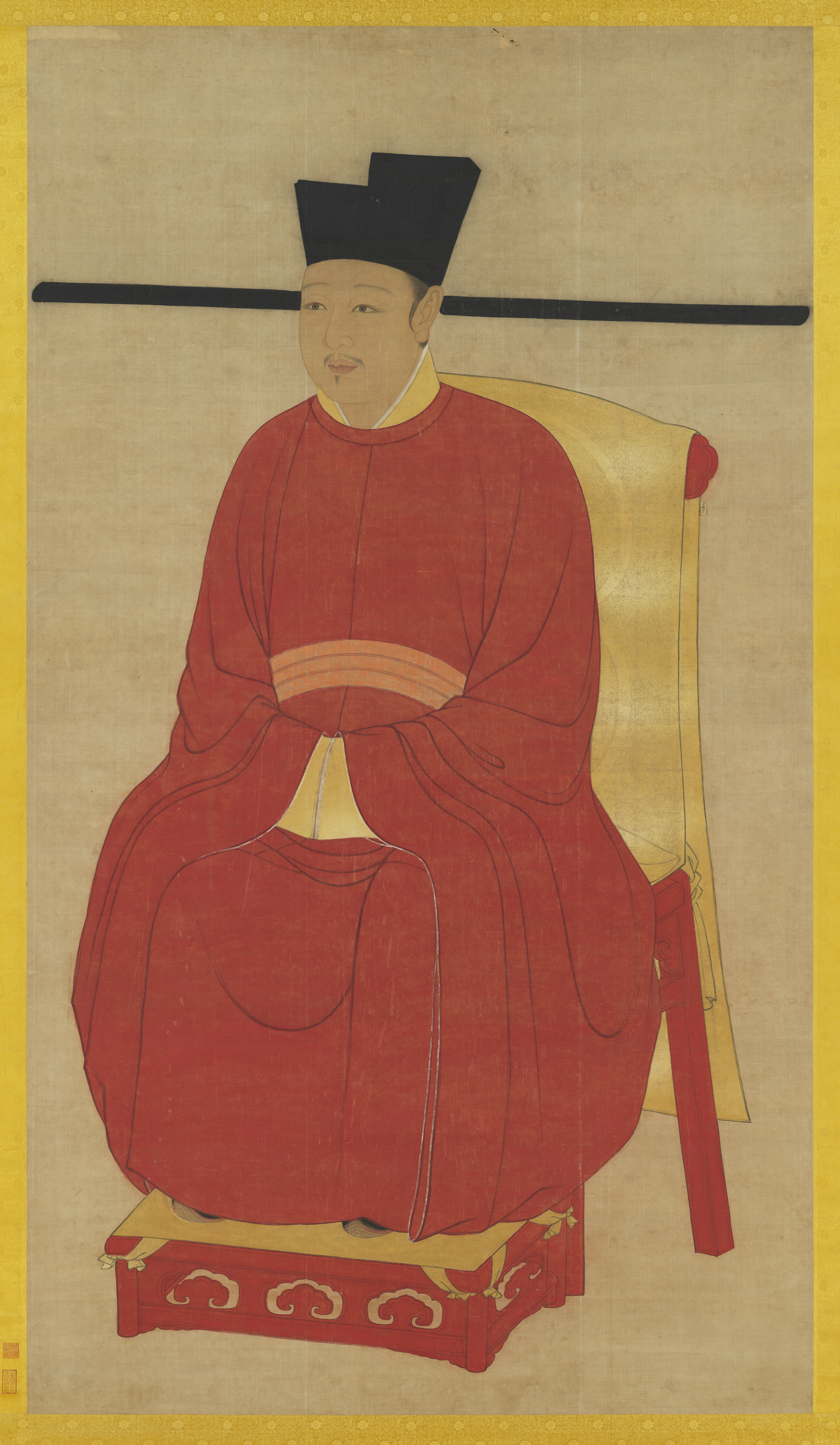
Emperor Huizong of Song (r. 1100–1126)

The Song state claimed the authority to approve, regulate, codify, and control all religious activity in the realm, including the institutionalized religions of Buddhism and Daoism. It limited the numbers of ordained Buddhist monks and Daoist priests through a system of ordination certificates that could be bought and sold. It approved the abbots for the public Buddhist monasteries. It issued name plaques for registered Buddhist and Daoist temples. It kept a register of shrines and granted titles to their principal deities, which included mountains, streams, dragons, and local gods that had once been human men or women. Policy makers wanted to ensure that the government had final say on who became religious professionals and what sorts of worship activities they engaged in.

— Patricia Ebrey

=== Three Teachings ===
The Song claimed authority over all religions in a manner that has been described as religious neutrality. The Song government sponsored works from all Three Teachings (Taoism, Confucianism, and Buddhism) such as the printing of texts. The Confucian canon had already been printed in 953, seven years prior to the Song's founding. The Buddhist canon was printed under Emperor Taizu of Song (r. 960–976) and the Taoist canon was printed in 1010. From 1106 to 1113, a revision of the Tang dynasty Ritual of the Kaiyuan Period was undertaken, the result of which included many Taoist additions such as offerings at state-sponsored Taoist temples and a variety of occasions when announcements were to be made not only at the altar of soil and grain, but also Taoist temples.

Taizu ordered state officials to visit Buddhist monasteries to burn incense on the days his father, grandparents, and great-grandparents had died. He also looked to Buddhist temples for the post-mortem welfare of his ancestors. His successor, Taizong, also converted the barracks in which he was born to a Buddhist monastery. In 971, Taizu ordered work begin on a complete print edition of the Tripiṭaka Buddhist Canon (Kaibao zangshu 開寶藏書) in Chengdu. It took 10 years to finish the 130,000 blocks needed to print the text. The finished product, the Sichuan edition of the Kaibao Canon, also known as the Kaibao Tripitaka, was printed in 983.

In a first for Chinese dynasties, the Song emperors began placing imperial portraits in large Taoist and Buddhist temples in the early 11th century. They were met with disapproval by Confucians who criticized the overlapping of functions with the imperial shrine. In 1082, Emperor Shenzong of Song (r. 1067–1085) solved the problem by creating a dedicated palace with 11 halls for imperial images.

In addition to the Three Teachings, the Song claimed authority over local religions such as the worship of and sacrifices to local shrines, which required. The Song kept registers of such activities. In 1050, Emperor Renzong of Song (r. 1022–1063) ordered magistrates and prefects to report local shrines to mountains and rivers that made prayers for rain so that they could be added to the registers of sacrifices. Gods were also registered. In 1111, those compiling a nation-wide gazetteer were instructed to include information on shrines and compare it to the information in the registers.

=== State Taoism ===
While the Song claimed authority over all religious activity, like the Tang dynasty before them, the Song emperors leaned towards favoring Taoism. However unlike the Tang who favored the aristocratic Shangqing School of Taoism, the Song patronized the more popular exorcistic Zhengyi School (Orthodox Unity).

By the time of Emperor Taizong of Song's (r. 976–997) reign, the Song emperors began favoring Taoism. His succession was foretold by a Taoist in a revelation, for which he had a temple constructed at the Zhongnan Mountains. The Zhongnan Mountains was where Laozi revealed the Tao Te Ching and the temple contained a hall dedicated to Zhenwu, the "true warrior," an anthropomorphic version of Xuanwu. Worship of Zhenwu became widespread among Taoists and would eventually become their foremost deity as well as the later Ming dynasty's protector deity.

In 1012, Emperor Zhenzong of Song (r. 997–1022) had a dream that his family was descended from the gods of Taoism, the Jade Emperor and the Yellow Emperor. Zhenzong declared his ancestor the Holy Ancestor and his birthday and the day in which he manifested himself to be holidays. He ordered images of the Holy Ancestor to be placed in prefectural temples and for Taoist rituals to be performed there. A 2,610 room Palace of Jade Purity was built to house documents from heaven Zhenzong received in the year 1008. Gilded bronze statues of the Jade Emperor, the Holy Ancestor, and his two predecessors were placed on thrones in the Palace of Jade Purity, flanked by jade statues of himself. In 1009, Zhenzong ordered the construction of the Taoist temples of Heavenly Felicity.

From 1014 to 1016, a 726-room Taoist Palace of Spectacular Numina was built under the supervision of Zhenzong's widow. The central hall bore an image of the Holy Ancestor and its walls painted with portraits of Taoist transcendents with the imperial surname Zhao. A statue of Zhenzong was placed in this hall after his death. The Palace of Jade Purity burnt down soon afterward. The Palace of Spectacular Numina was rebuilt after the Jingkang Incident in Lin'an and ten Taoist priests were assigned to it.

Emperor Huizong of Song (r. 1100–1126) was heavily influenced by a Taoist named Lin Lingsu. Huizong came to consider himself the head of Taoism and the incarnation of the son of a high god. Huizong considered Taoism and Confucianism to share a common origin and sought to synthesize the two to accommodate both Confucian classics and Taoist revelations. He set up charity clinics at Taoist temples in 1119 and named them using a combination of Taoist and Confucian terminology: "Humane Aid Pavilions" - Humane from Confucianism; Aid from Taoism. At the same time Huizong renamed Buddhist monks to deshi to correspond with the Taoist daoshi, in effect subordinating Buddhism to Taoism. He considered Buddhist and Taoist gods to be of similar value and their only criterion was that they responded to people's prayers. He opposed heterodox practices such as shamanism and is credited with destroying 1,138 temples in 1111. Huizong's efforts to homogenize religious activity by synthesizing Buddhism and Confucianism with Taoism has been described as an attempt "to create a single religion that incorporated all state-approved religious practice under the (Daoist) religion of which he was the divine pope".

== Folk religion ==
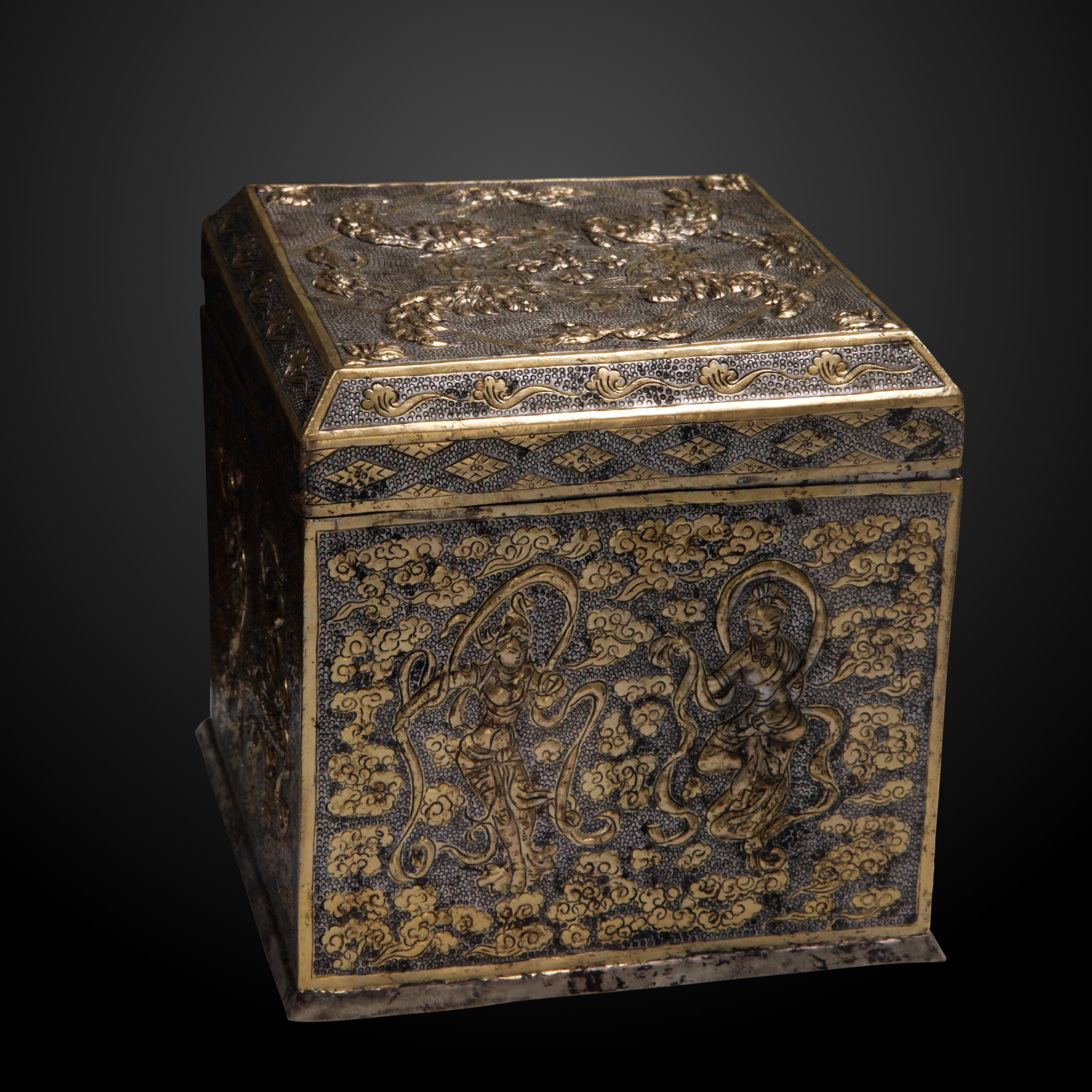
Ornate container, Liao dynasty

During the Song dynasty, the three major religions and to an extent Neo-Confucianism, underwent a process of rationalizing Chinese folk religion by systematically incorporating and categorizing deities into a universal pantheon. This was encouraged by state policy, which also pruned religious conduct by sanctioning correct and incorrect religious practices. For example, the Neo-Confucian scholar-official Huang Zhen (1213–81) forbade rowing boats to welcome gods, destroyed 1,300 such boats, destroyed "perverse temples," and forbade the worship of epidemic gods. At the same time, nature deities such as earth gods were anthropomorphized, often into guardian deities. Not all were male. In one case, the guardian deity was a concubine, who according to legend fought off a group of bandits after having her head chopped off.

Family temples were common during the Song-Yuan period and they served as the primary kinship institution at the time. As of 1041, only officials of the top three ranks in the Song government were allowed to erect family temples. In 1111, this right was extended to all officials, however this still amounted to a minute fraction of the 100 million inhabitants of the Song dynasty. Neo-Confucians promoted the ancestor hall for the worship of "a Prime Ancestor and four other generations." Both Buddhists and Taoists engaged in local religious activities by looking after graves and ancestral sacrifices. As a result, it was not uncommon for people to patronize both Buddhist and Taoist temples. In one instance, the Lis of Wuyuan constructed nine Taoist shrines and thirteen Buddhist temples for worshiping their ancestors.

Exorcism was practiced by both Buddhists and Taoists. Taoists sold amulets and spells to ward off demons such as the Wutong Shen, believed to be shape shifters with large penises that granted wealth to a man for favors with their wife. Some people worshiped demons, animal gods, epidemic gods, or vengeful ghosts. The state actively fought against this type of religious activity. In 1011, a fox spirit temple was torn down and a temple dedicated to a Great Tortoise King was also destroyed. These institutions were headed by shamans who rivaled the government in power in their locale.

== Taoism ==
The Zhengyi Celestial Masters frequently received imperial appointments. In 1239, Emperor Lizong of Song (r. 1224–1264) commanded the 35th Celestial Master Zhang Keda to unite the Lingbao School, the Shangqing School and Zhengyi Dao. The new school retained the Zhengyi name and remain based at Mount Longhu. Shortly after the schools were united, the Mongols under Kublai Khan conquered the Southern Song dynasty and established the Yuan dynasty in China.

He accepted the claim that the Celestial Master of Mount Longhu was descended from Zhang Daoling and granted the school the right to control affairs relating to Taoism in the Jiangnan area. In 1304, as a result of Zhengyi Dao's increased importance under the Mongols, all of the Taoist schools, with the exception of the Quanzhen School, were united under the banner of the Zhengyi School, with the 38th Celestial Master, Zhang Yucai, as leader.

... it can be said that some schools were later stages of earlier schools and had developed out of them, like the Five-Pecks-of-Grain School, the Longhu Church 龍虎宗 or the Zhenyi School 正一道, or the Shangqing School and the Maoshan Church 茅山宗, the Lingbao School and the Gezao Church 閣皂宗. Depending on the grade of difference in their teachings and practice, they are described here as different schools. Concerning some of the Daoist schools, there is not a sufficient amount of historiographical material to provide a deeper insight into their teachings and history, like the Wudang School 武當道, the Laoshan School 嶗山派, the Sanfeng School, the Sazu School, or the many branches of the Quanzhen School, like the Longmen 龍門, Suishan 隨山, Nanwu (or Namo) 南無, Yuxian 遇仙, Huashan 華山, Yushan 嵛山 or Qingjing 清靜 schools. For some younger schools, doctrinal differences are so small that they can barely be called separate schools...

— Ulrich Theobald

The aristocratic Shangqing School, also known as Maoshan Taoism, declined in influence after the Tang dynasty. It was still sponsored by the Song emperors, especially under the patriarch Liu Hunkang (1036-1108), but not to the same degree as the Zhengyi School.

The Lingbao School experienced a mild resurgence during the Song after practically dying out during the Tang. It originally focused on achieving physical immortality, but influence from Buddhism shifted the conception of immortality to a more abstract one in which the mind no longer desired physical continuation of the body.

It was only during the Tang period 唐 (618-907) that the practice of outer alchemy was gradually replaced by the more healthy and also more spiritual inner alchemy. In consequence, physical immortality (shengtian 升天 "flying up to the sky", becoming a "winged man" yuren 羽人 [which is a Daoist term for "to die"]) was replaced by a more mental concept of longevity and the strive for quietness. It was especially the Quanzhen School that openly condemned the belief in immortals during the Song period. Instead, the aim of the believer was to find his "true and perfect nature" (zhenxing 真性) that was in unison with the natural "Way" and would allow the "luminous spirit" (yangshen 陽神) to ascend to Heaven. This means that it is not the body which is immortal, but the spirit of the practitioner.

— Ulrich Theobald

From the Song dynasty to the Yuan dynasty, a local snake deity in Sichuan became the Taoist god of literature and examinations known as Wenchang Wang.

== Buddhism ==
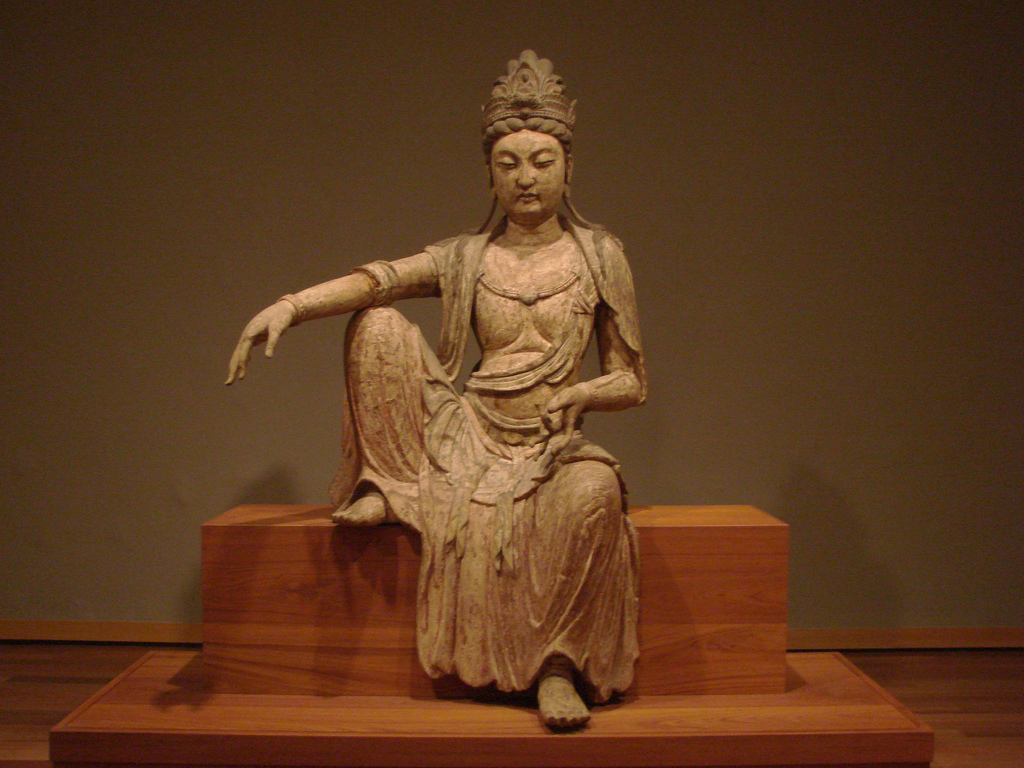
Wooden statue of Guanyin, ca. 1025, Song dynasty

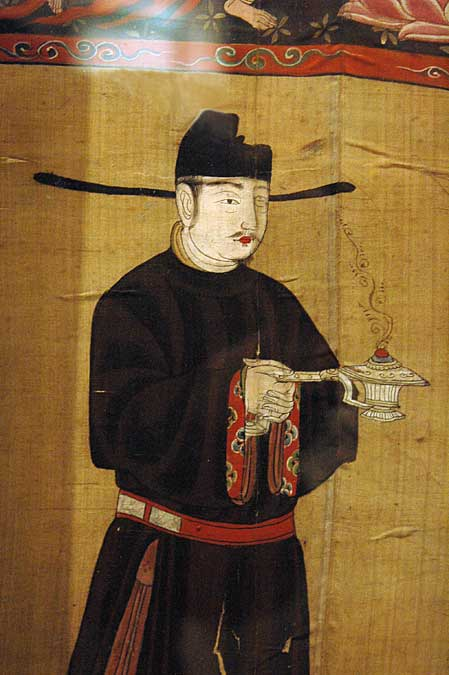
Male Buddhist donor, Song dynasty, 981

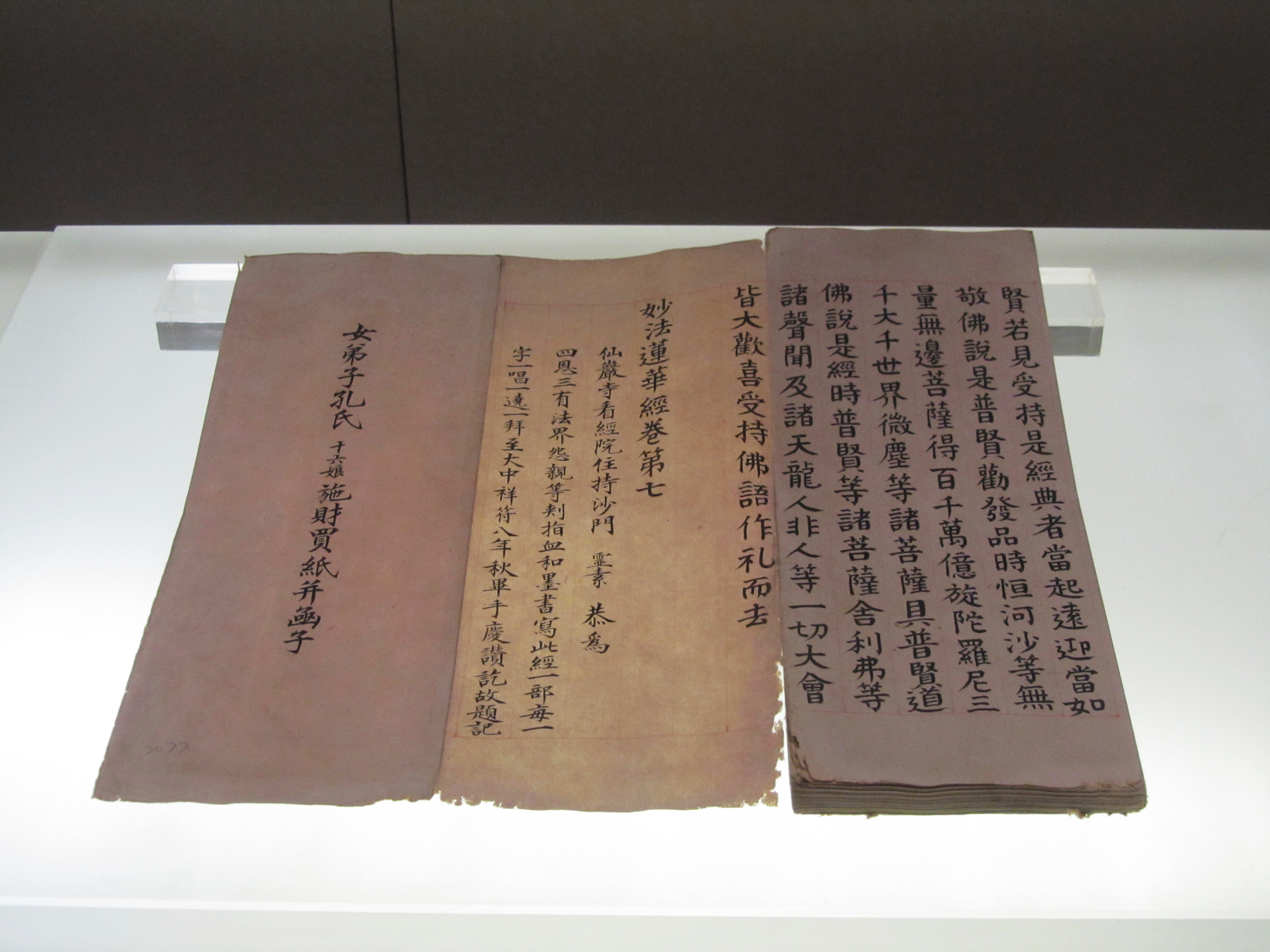
Buddhist text, Song dynasty

With the sole exception of the reign of Emperor Huizong of Song (1100-1126), Buddhism was not suppressed during the Song dynasty.

Buddhist monasteries were separated into public and private categories by the Song government. The abbots of public monasteries, which tended to be wealthy, were appointed as local officials. Public monasteries performed state services such as memorials for the war dead, maintaining religious spaces for imperial birthdays and deathdays, storing imperial calligraphy, and galleries of imperial portraits.

Buddhist establishments also operated a range of businesses, such as oil presses, water-powered mills, pawnshops, and hostels. Large Buddhist estates leased plots of land to tenants who could work them. Most of them belonged to the Chan and Pure Land (jingtu) sects. However, as early as the 10th century, practitioners were trying to bring the two sects closer together. Individuals such as Yanshou (904-975) taught both Chan and Pure Land Buddhism. In 1221, records counted the existence of 400,000 monks and 61,000 nuns in the dynasty.

In 1067, the government started selling Buddhist monk certificates which exempted them from tax and labor service. The first batch of certificates sold at 130 strings of cash each. Around 120,000 certificates were sold between 1161 and 1170. Owners of these certificates did not have to be real monks and were not required to shave their heads or wear clerical attire.

=== Chan ===
Chan Buddhism was the most prominent form of Chinese Buddhism during the Song era due to state support. Chan monasteries received state recognition and financial backing. Chan followers generally avoided the court and political life. Its followers believed that intuition and enlightenment could be gained from public discussion. In practice, Chan traditions were only taught from master to pupil in a small circle of believers. Of the five Chan houses: Caodong, Linji, Yunmen, Guiyang, and Fayan, it was Fayan that led the Chan in the 10th and 11th centuries.

Eventually the Fayan, Linji, and Yunmen combined to create the gong'an, which originally meant legal precedents, but morphed into a story, dialogue, question, or statement used to create doubt in a student and test their progress in Chan. After the Song dynasty, Chan Buddhism became less distinguishable from Buddhism in general as it incorporated elements of devotion from Pure Land Buddhism and its practitioners inhabited the same monasteries as non-Chan clergy.

=== Pure Land ===
Pure Land Buddhism is a broad branch of Mahayana Buddhism that focuses on practicing meritorious acts in order to be reborn in the Pure Land. It was the focus in the formation of a number of societies during the Song dynasty. They were later collectively known as the White Lotus Society. Their membership consisted of not just monastic members, but also lay people, women and people from the lower classes. Pure Land practitioners believed that repeatedly chanting the Amitabha Buddha's name, a practice called nianfo, would lead to salvation.

The goal of rebirth in the Pure Land made the period directly preceding and that immediately following death a critical time fraught with both danger and opportunity in the determination of one’s future destiny. This resulted in the creation of deathbed and funerary practices that aided the dying and the newly deceased in the attainment of Pure Land. The content of one’s last thoughts were thought to be the crucial factor in determining one’s next rebirth, and thus deathbed rites were designed to assist the dying in forging a karmic link with the Pure Land by fixing their mind on Amitabha. Depending on the dying person’s disposition, deathbed rituals might involve repentance, the chanting of sutras, or, most importantly, mindful recollection of Amitabha (nianfo, nenbutsu), deriving largely from the promise of the Guan Wuliangshou jing that ten uninterrupted thoughts on the Buddha would lead to rebirth even for those who had accumulated a lifetime of evil karma. Increasingly, this latter practice was interpreted in terms of vocally reciting the Buddha’s name. The dying person was encouraged to intone the Buddha’s name, and, if that was no longer possible, it was done for him or her by assistants. He or she would be often placed in front of an image of Amitabha and given a cord to hold that was attached to Amitabha’s right hand. This symbolic link portended both the aspirant’s hope for rebirth and the grace and power of the Buddha flowing through the connection.

Tiantai Buddhism is synonymous with the development of lay Buddhism and Pure Land Buddhism.

=== Doctrines ===
- Chan
  - Everyone has the potential to become a Buddha
  - Monks practice physical labour ("A day without work is a day without food")
  - Agrarian self-sufficiency
  - Meditation on huatou (key word or phrase) was a central monastic routine
- Pure Land
  - Belief in meritorious acts that result in rebirth in the Pure Land
  - Meritorious acts include: mindful recollections of the Buddha, chanting sutras, meditating on the Buddha, worshiping and singing praises to the Buddha
  - "Mindful recollections" (nianfo) that required meditating on the qualities of the Buddha
  - Acts in accordance to bodhisattva precepts were encouraged: building bridges, digging wells, convincing people from taking life or eating meat, providing shelter for travelers, and burying the dead
  - Some practitioners practiced self immolation as acts of devotion in hopes of rebirth in the Pure Land
- Tiantai
  - Belief in the Threefold Truth: emptiness of all things, temporariness of all phenomena, the synthesis of provisional and empty nature as the middle truth
  - Endeavor in the separation of one's consciousness from worldly phenomena through spiritual concentration
  - Buddha nature can be found in inanimate objects

== Confucianism ==
What Confucianism is and what it is not is contested even to this day. According to Wang Anshi (1021-1086), "Today, everyone has a different interpretation of the Confucian classics." Wang's New Policies were criticized as anti-Confucian but he himself was a devout Confucian scholar and statesman. His proposed solution to the crisis of interpretations was for the emperor to publish his own interpretations as orthodoxy to unify the scholars. Wang believed that the Rites of Zhou was the blueprint for good governance in his time and that it advocated for centralized fiscal-activism.

Like Neo-Confucians, Wang argued against Buddhism. In his "Treatise on Great Men", Wang developed a system ascribing three attributes to every sage: greatness, sageliness, and numinosity. Wang implied that the Buddha only possessed numinosity while Confucian sages possessed greatness and sageliness. Although numinosity was the greatest of the three virtues, Wang believed that it did not benefit the common people because it did not engage with practical action represented by greatness and sageliness. Some consider Wang to be a Neo-Confucian.

== Neo-Confucianism ==
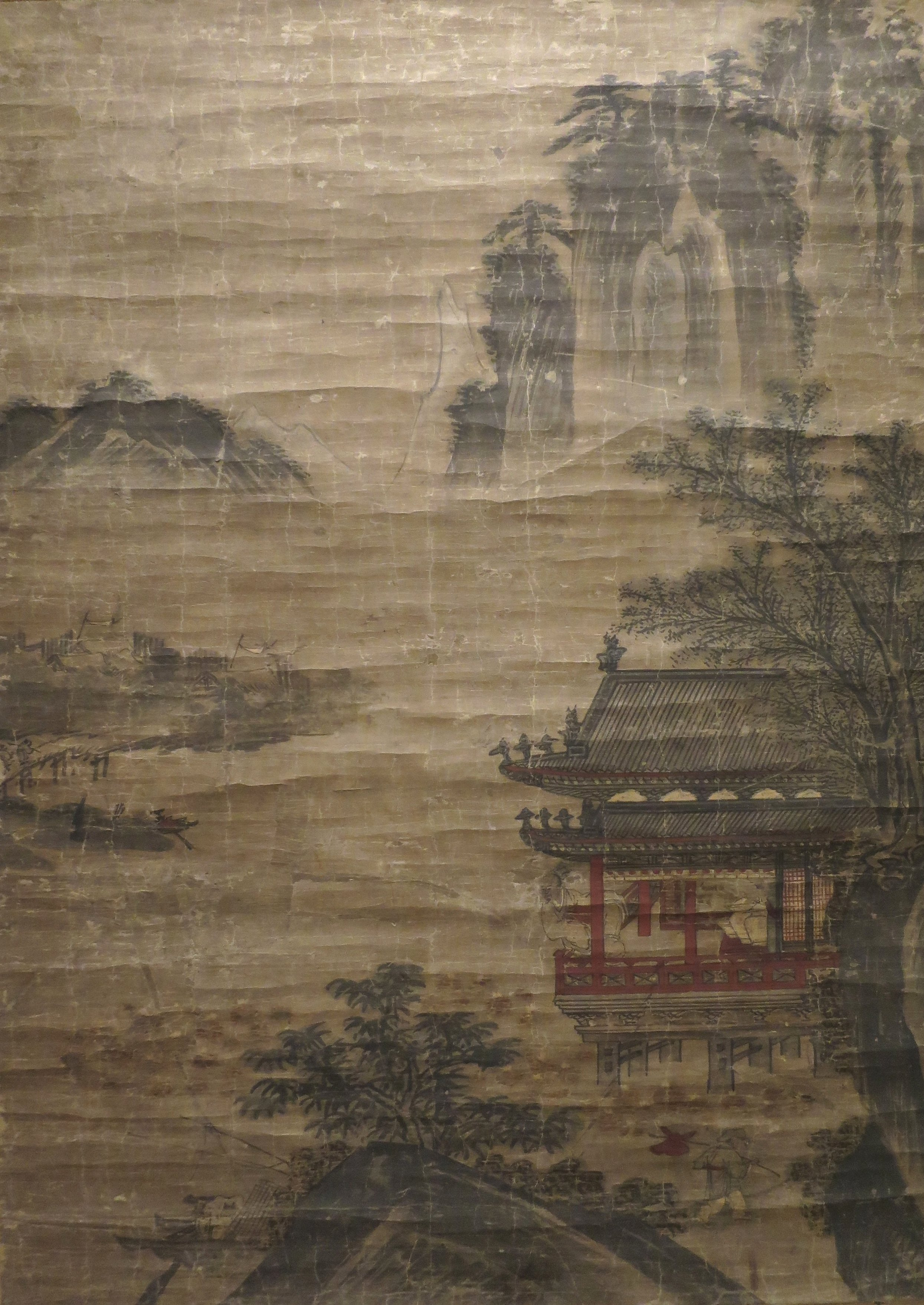
Zhou Dunyi (1017-1073) admiring lotus flowers, 16th century

=== Definition ===
Neo-Confucianism, also known as dao xue (Learning of the Way), li xue (Learning of the Principle), and xin xue (Learning of the Heart/Mind) was a major philosophical school that emerged during the Song dynasty as a response to the dominance of Taoism and Buddhism in intellectual and political arenas. More broadly speaking, "Neo-Confucian" has been used to refer to Tang dynasty scholars later identified as belonging to a movement to revive Confucianism after the rise of Buddhism in China. Defined more narrowly, it can also refer to a subset of that group of Confucians in the 11th century.

=== Origins ===
Neo-Confucianism was conceived among elite scholar-officials that sought to update Confucianism by rejecting superstitious and metaphysical elements influenced by Buddhism and Taoism. Most of these Confucians saw Confucianism as being in competition with Taoism and Buddhism, which they considered incompatible with Confucianism and detrimental to Chinese society, resulting in moral decline. Confucians such as Sun Fu (fl. 1020) accused Buddhists and Taoists of destroying the Three Fundamental Bonds and called on practicing Confucians to attack them.

The most distressing issue about these religions for Neo-Confucians was their focus on personal liberation from suffering by extricating oneself from worldly desires, which took precedence over other goals. By promoting the elimination of desires and attachments such as human relationships, these religions were perceived to be discarding worldly interests for unsubstantiated futures such as nirvana or immortality.

Neo-Confucians argued that this form of liberation was selfish and motivated by personal gain. In essence a form of normative egoism. Acts of compassion by Buddhist practitioners were called into question for subordinating ethics to one's own quest for salvation. Another Buddhist ideal that Neo-Confucians took issue with was the concept of emptiness and voidness, which they considered fundamentally wrong.

Despite Neo-Confucian antagonism towards the two other major religions, it drew from a broader philosophical and religious framework in which Buddhist and Taoist ideas and terms were ubiquitous to gain widespread respectability among the educated. The Neo-Confucian break from Buddhist and Taoist influences was not a clean cut as it inadvertently adopted some aspects of those religions. For example, Principle (li), is sometimes the same word Buddhists use to describe emptiness. Li is not given much attention in classical Confucian texts, in which it is devoid of the metaphysical meaning given to it by Neo-Confucians. The greater focus on meditation is another influence from Buddhism and Taoism.

Proponents of Neo-Confucianism were also concerned about the deterioration of Confucianism (Ruism), specifically Confucianism practiced by all Confucians after Mengzi. The Neo-Confucian scholar Cheng Yi argued that the Confucians of his time were too concerned with literary composition and mastering Classical studies, that literary composition was nothing more than flowery words while Classical studies was just analyzing glosses and creating novel interpretations. Cheng Yi divided learned people of his time into three categories: those of literary ability, those who studied Classics to become teachers, and those who knew the Way through Ru learning.

The Song pioneers of Neo-Confucianism include Shao Yong (1017-1077), Zhou Dunyi (1017-1073), Zhang Zai (1020-1077), Cheng Hao (1032-1085), Cheng Yi (1033-1107), Zhu Xi (1130-1200), and Lu Jiuyuan (1139-1192). They heavily emphasized the Confucian values exemplified in the writings of Tang scholars Liu Yuxi (772-842), Liu Zongyuan (773–819), and Han Yu (768-824). Their efforts to produce systems of Confucian doctrine produced three new schools: Daoxue (道学), Lixue (理学), and Xinxue (心學), collectively translated as Neo-Confucianism. Daoxue emphasized cultivating sincerity as the path to sagehood. Lixue emphasized studying the Classics in order to understand Principle, the source of moral norms. Xinxue argued that the heart/mind was the source of all moral values and understanding it was the only path to enlightenment.

The renaissance of Confucianism was a direct reaction against the long prevailing of philosophical Daoism since the end of the Han Dynasty and the power of Buddhism during the time of North-South division and the early Tang Dynasty. Tang scholars saw not only their own position as state advisors endangered, but they were afraid the influence of the foreign religion of Buddhism on Chinese government and the social traditions. Buddhism is a religion with a very complex metaphysical philosophy, an aspect that the old Confucianism totally ignores. The aim of Tang and Song time Confucian writers was to find a system that was able to explain the universe and the position and behaviour of man in a way that could cope with the sophisticated Buddhist philosophy.

— Ulrich Theobald

=== Reception by authority ===
Neo-Confucianism was initially unattractive to individuals such as Emperor Huizong of Song due to its elite exclusiveness. There was also concern about the Neo-Confucian view on the emperor's authority. When Emperor Guangzong of Song (r. 1189–1194) failed to honor his father, the retired Emperor Xiaozong of Song (r. 1162–1189), Zhu Xi and other Neo-Confucians joined the effort to force Guangzong off the throne. Zhu argued that in antiquity, rulers and ministers were similar in status. Neo-Confucians denied that the emperor had authority over cultural and moral values, which rested in the literati and the process of self-cultivation.

Some Neo-Confucians such as Zhang Zai (1020-1077) and Hu Hong (1106–1161) suggested that hereditary governorships, created through enfeoffment (fengjian 封建), were superior to governors in their own time, who were selected based on their performance in the imperial examinations and switched posts on a regular basis. They argued that by creating regional power bases around multi-generational hereditary governors, China would be better situated to survive should the emperor and the imperial court be thrown into disarray. Zhang and Hong thought the relationship between a hereditary governor and his subjects would be more family-like and intimate. In 1144, Neo-Confucian followers were banned from taking the examinations.

There was, Zhu contended, a real difference between the sage-kings of antiquity, who embodied correct learning and ruled accordingly, and the early imperial emperors, who governed but did not know how to learn. The sage-kings were truly "Kings," but the emperors of later times were merely "hegemons," men who ruled through power and were motivated by self-interest.
The implication of this view was that no imperial dynasty could claim "heaven's mandate" or assert, by virtue of its power, that it had the right to instruct people in morality. The Neo-Confucian standard for assessing rulers was whether their actions were guided by the moral conscience (tian li, "heavenly principle" or "universal coherence") . They concluded that not a single emperor had met this standard. Nor could they have.

— Peter K. Bol

After Zhu Xi's death in 1200, his commentaries were allowed to be taught in schools in 1212, accepted into the mainstream in 1227, and Neo-Confucianism became the state orthodoxy in 1241.

=== Religious worship ===
After Neo-Confucianism became state orthodoxy in 1241, academies (shuyuan) began to enjoy the same sponsorship as Buddhist and Taoist temples. These academies were often associated with shrines and sacrifices to Confucian scholars, in contrast to the deity worshiping Buddhist and Taoist temples. The Academy of the Illumined Way was set up in 1175 as a shrine to Cheng Hao, who occupied a place of worship in the central shrine. It was formally established as an academy in 1215. It fell into disrepair shortly after and became a hostel for military personnel.

The academy was restored in the mid-13th century and descendants of Cheng Hao were appointed to administer the academy. Visits to the shrine were mandatory for students and up to three demerits could be recorded for not attending. Shrines dedicated to Han Yu, Zhu Xi, and Lu Jiuyuan were also widespread by the early Yuan dynasty. Occasional references to land disputes between academies and temples indicate that they probably tried to occupy the same sacred space.

The academies carried out functions similar to Buddhist temples and performed rituals of fasting and worship, although the subjects of their worship were different. Not only did these academies worship Neo-Confucian scholars, they generally celebrated political and cultural heroes outside official government service or those who had been victimized by imperial whims in their political struggles.

Academies served as institutional centers for the group. Rituals performed at the academies enhanced bonding. Prostrating before a master, one ritually declared oneself a student and became part of a lineage for propagating certain texts. Services every morning that included burning incense before an altar for ancient sages and recent masters enhanced awareness among academy students of continuity and cohesiveness within the tradition.

— Hoyt Cleveland Tillman

=== Doctrines ===
Song-Yuan Neo-Confucianism was a "systematic philosophy of self, society, government, and cosmos." The original goal at the inception of the Neo-Confucian movement was to shift the emphasis of formal education away from literary achievements to the learning of the moral Way (dao 道). To do this, the two major schools of Neo-Confucianism emphasized different forms of self cultivation.

The Cheng–Zhu school linked principle or li to the heart (xin). The heart began with benevolence, righteousness, propriety, and wisdom. Zhu Xi emphasized the "investigation of these things," which when conducted "one by one," would hopefully lead to an epiphany, especially in regards to the four beginnings of the heart. As part of this process, the Cheng-Zhu school suggested reading as a self-cultivation technique, with the goal of reaching moral revelations beyond the text. For this reason, Neo-Confucianism focused on philosophical works rather than other genres like history, rites, and poetry.

The Lu-Wang school, better known as Yangmingism after the later Wang Yangming (1472-1529), argued that knowledge is intuitive and irrational, and therefore does not lie in books. Lu Jiuyuan argued that this was the case since in the time of Yao and Shun, there were no books. Lu was confident that the truth could be obtained through discussion and was wary of excessive book-learning. Lu did not share Zhu's belief in an abstract realm of principles or human nature that served as an intermediary between the mind and principle.

While the Cheng-Zhu school gained prominence with state backing in 1241, the Lu-Wang school eventually became the intellectually dominant strain of Neo-Confucianism. Unlike the Lu-Wang school, which was ecumenical in nature, the Cheng-Zhu school was combative and exclusionary. It opposed not just Taoism and Buddhism, but also disagreed with state driven initiatives. Zhu Xi criticized Wang Anshi's plans for being "statist in nature, seeking to enrich the state at the expense of the populace," whereas he promoted private academies, local community, and family ritual. Neo-Confucianism envisioned a society based on voluntary community institutions and did not support society changing government programs.

- Cheng-Zhu School
  - Return to origins with a focus on Confucius and Mengzi
  - Recognition of emotions as a necessary facet of moral life
  - Self-cultivation is central as it unites theory and practice
  - Self-cultivation refers to the philosophical commitment to an ethical ideal in which true understanding necessarily translates into action, and action necessarily arises from true understanding
  - Focus on learning the Four Books instead of the Five Classics
  - Focus on self-cultivation to realize moral potential rather than learning history, rites, and poetry
- Lu-Wang School
  - Ultimate principles of reality are found in the feelings of the heart/mind
  - Principle is not independent from the mind/heart and is revealed through its activities
  - Principle is living and can be realized through one's will and action
  - Moral knowledge embodies the truth of principle and the heart/mind
  - Knowledge is innate
  - You don't have to be a bookworm to practice self-cultivation

=== Pioneers ===
==== Shao Yong (1012-1077) ====
Shao Yong was born in 1012 to a family of humble scholars in Fanyang (southwest of modern Beijing). Invasions by the Liao dynasty led the Shaos to eventually settle in Weizhou (modern Hui County, Henan). Shao Yong never participated in the imperial examinations nor did he pursue an official career, despite receiving at least two imperial summons (in 1061 and 1069). In 1049, Shao moved to Luoyang and taught Cheng Hao and Cheng Yi in the mid-1050s.

In 1069, Wang Anshi began to implement his New Policies, which resulted in a number of detractors resigning and relocating to Luoyang, which became a refuge for the anti-Wang bureaucrats. Shao emerged as a sagely council to this group. Despite, or because of his influence, Shao remained unemployed for the majority of his life, living off of his closest associates Sima Guang, Cheng Hao, and Lü Gongzhu, who provided him with basic necessities including his home, which he called his "nest of peace and happiness." He called himself Mr. Happiness.

Unlike later Neo-Confucianists, Shao Yong openly admired Taoist iconoclasts, did not emphasize the Confucian virtues of ren and yi, or hold li as the most important concept. Instead, Shao believed that shu (number) was the first useful tool created by the Taiji (Supreme Ultimate) that could be used to advance knowledge. He considered the "teaching or learning of Before Heaven," a predictive knowledge based on the application of number, to be the most esteemed category of knowledge. Number was the most perfect mode to describe this type of knowledge because of its inherent regulative features. To understand and fully utilize the xin (heart/mind), Shao believed that number had to be used.

==== Zhou Dunyi (1017-1073) ====
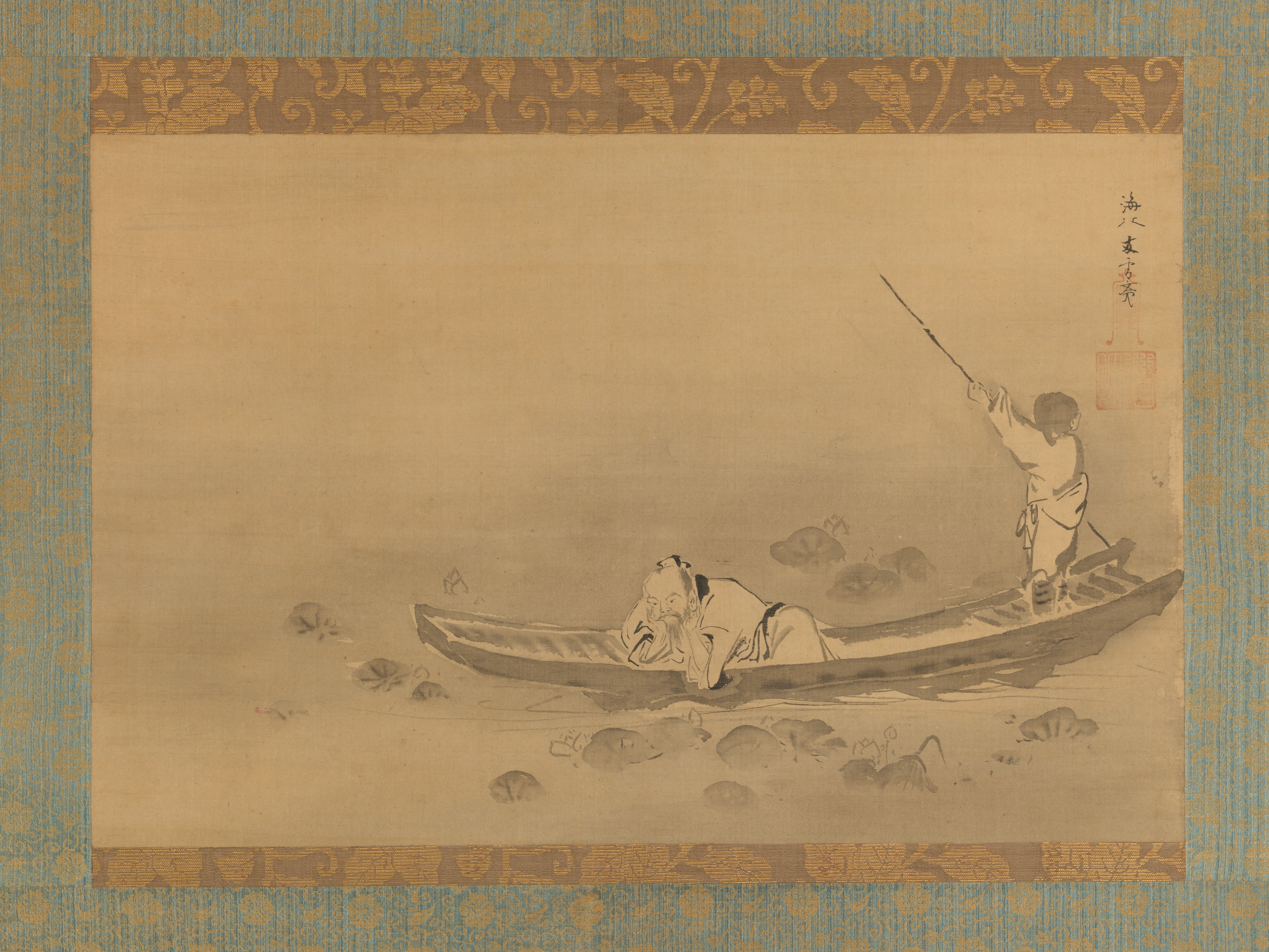
Zhou Dunyi admiring lotuses by Kaihō Yūsetsu, mid-17th century

There is no indication that Zhou Dunyi ever participated in or passed the imperial examinations. However, in 1036, he secured an official post as a keeper of records, likely owing to his substantial connections: both his father and maternal uncle were jinshi degree holders. Zhou did not assume his first post until 1040 due to his mother's death in 1037. Once he commenced his work, Zhou distinguished himself as an adjudicator of legal disputes and an erudite Confucianist.

In the 1040s, Zhou attracted a number of pupils, including Cheng Hao and Cheng Yi from 1046 to 1047. They evidently did not like him and referred to him as a "decrepit Chan stranger." In 1060, he met and spent several days with Wang Anshi, who had a highly favorable impression of Zhou. In 1068, Zhou became assistant fiscal commissioner, and in 1071, a judicial commissioner. In 1072, he retired to Lushan in modern Dao County, Hunan, and died the following year.

Zhou Dunyi is considered the founder of Daoxue (Learning of the Way), but he did not consciously seek to become the head of a movement, and only received the position upon posthumous elevation by Zhu Xi. According to Zhu, Zhou Dunyi was the linkage between the classical patriarchs of Confucianism that ended with Mengzi with their time. Zhou himself believed that the Taiji (Supreme Ultimate) was the progenitor of everything, and within the Taiji, the dao or Way and the li (Principle) are united by sincerity. Zhou heavily emphasized cultivating sincerity and that sincerity was the foundation of the sage ('sagehood is nothing more than sincerity').

==== Zhang Zai (1020-1077) ====
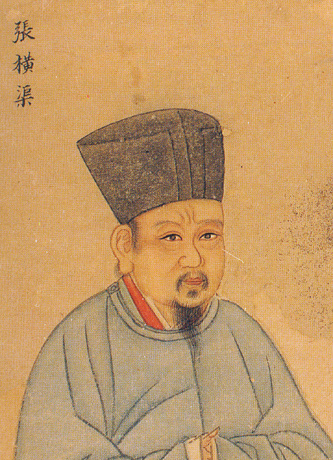
Zhang Zai (1020-1077)

Zhang Zai (1020-1077) was born in 1020 in Daliang, near Kaifeng. After the death of his father, his family moved to Hengqu (in modern Mei County, Shaanxi). During his youth, Zhang was infatuated with the study of military matters and even organized a militia force with the intent of capturing territory from the Western Xia. In 1040, Zhang was convinced by Fan Zhongyan to give up a career in the military, which led Zhang to forays in Buddhism and Taoism.

In 1056, Zhang gave lectures on the Yijing in Kaifeng, the Song capital, and came to the attention of several prominent scholars, including Sima Guang. After meeting his nephews, Cheng Hao and Cheng Yi, Zhang gave up on public lecturing because he felt their knowledge surpassed his own. After that, Zhang dedicated himself to Confucian learning.

Zhang Zai and his nephew Cheng Hao obtained jinshi degrees in 1057. For the next decade, Zhang served in a number of provisional positions, including administrator in charge of laws. In 1069, Zhang was summoned for an audience with Emperor Shenzong of Song, who was pleased with his answers on how best to govern the empire. Shenzong requested Zhang to deliberate on Wang Anshi's New Policies, but Zhang was not keen on participating.

Later when Wang tried to recruit him as a participant in implementing the New Policies, Zhang advised Wang to conduct himself properly and cease pursuing a policy of micro-management. Displeased with Zhang's attitude, Wang demoted him to the provinces and almost drove him to quitting office altogether. After the death of his brother, Zhang Jian (1030-1076), Zhang Zai resigned and spent the remaining year of his life devoted to study and teaching.

Zhang Zai believed in a materialist conception of the world and theorized that the basic element of the universe was qi. Zhang believed that everything was made of qi and thus nothing could be truly empty. He used his belief in the universal presence of qi to caution against withdrawal from the world in the manner of Buddhis clerics. Zhang also emphasized a link between the heart/mind with the body, and that sincerity upheld the natural order. His primary contribution to the Neo-Confucianist movement was his argument against the Buddhist conception of nothingness, which he considered nothing more than a more dispersed state of qi.

Generally speaking, the Neo-Confucians attacked the Buddhists for looking upon the world as illusory, for regarding everything as the mind, for failing to understand the nature of life and death and trying to undermine them, for their inability to handle human affairs, for escaping from the world and public responsibilities, for failing to fulfill human relations, for deserting parents, for leaving family life and thus eventually terminating the human race, for being lazy and selfish and aiming only at rebirth in Paradise, and for frightening people with transmigration.

— Wing-tsit Chan

==== Cheng Hao (1032-1085) ====
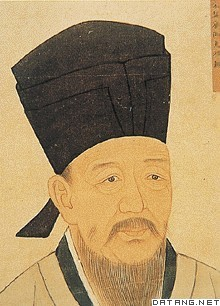
Cheng Hao (1032-1085)

Cheng Hao was born in Huangpo in present-day Hubei to a highly educated family. Cheng Hao learned to read poetry by the age of eight and composed poems by the age of ten. At the age of 12 and 13, he was considered mature and likable while boarding at the county school. At the age of 15, he and his brother Yi studied under Zhou Dunyi, from whom their main takeaway was to disregard the examination standards and to see the Way. Cheng Hao spent around ten years learning from various schools. In 1057, Cheng Hao obtained the jinshi degree.

From 1060 to 1062, he served as assistant magistrate in Huxian, in modern Shaanxi. In 1063, he was reappointed as assistant magistrate in Shangyuan, in modern Jiangsu, and magistrate in 1065. During his tenure, Cheng Hao balanced land distribution, reduced taxes, and arranged for ill soldiers to receive food and medicine. In his next appointment as magistrate of Jincheng in Zezhou, in modern Shaanxi, Cheng Hao promoted education, making his motto "every village should have a school."

In 1069, Cheng Hao was reappointed to the central government, where he came to disagree with Wang Anshi's New Policies. Cheng Hao submitted several memorials, one of which said that certain patterns of humane government did not change with time. Two years later, he was reassigned to probationary administrative assistant in Zhenning Commandery and Caocun in Chanzhou, modern Puyang County, Henan. There was flooding at the time along the Yellow River and Cheng Hao successfully led efforts to contain the floods and repair the dikes.

His father died the next year, causing him to resign and return to Luoyang. In 1075 he was assigned to magistrate in Fugou, in modern Henan, where there was a drought. He stabilized commodity prices, dug wells for irrigation, and established schools. According to his disciple, he kept the motto "treat the people as if treating the wounded" next to his desk. In 1080, Cheng Hao was removed from office. He died in the summer of 1085.

Cheng Hao linked human nature (xing) to qi. Hao believed that evil was a part of human nature. He emphasized the importance of ren (humaneness), and ren could only be achieved by regarding Heaven and Earth as part of one's body. It was paramount to communicate between the extremities of the body, such that the imperial court should be conscientious, aware, and sympathetic to the people's suffering.

==== Cheng Yi (1033-1107) ====
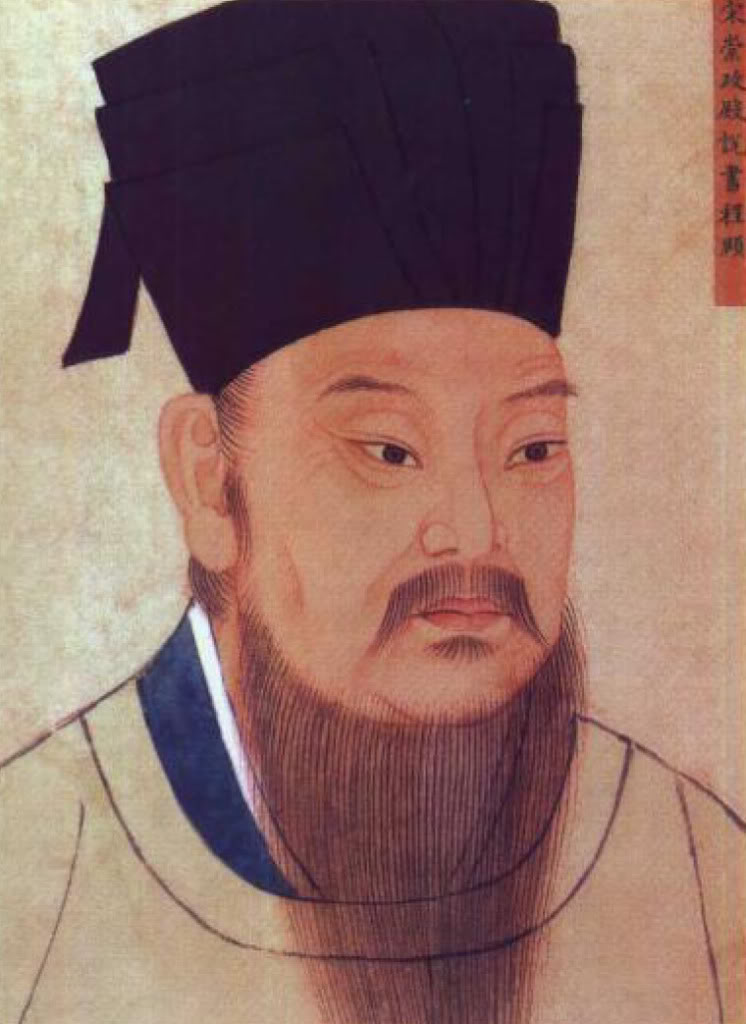
Cheng Yi (1033-1107)

Cheng Yi (1033-1107) was born a year after his brother, Cheng Hao. Unlike his brother, Cheng Yi was stern and full of self righteousness. In 1050, he submitted a memorial to Emperor Renzong of Song proclaiming that the learning of the sages had been lost but he had been able to obtain it because he had taken upon the responsibility of the Way. Cheng Yi failed the jinshi examination of 1059, after which he focused on his own studies and teaching, even though he was eligible for service due to hereditary privilege.

Cheng Yi did not hold office until 1086 when he became the emperor's lecturer. He was dismissed the next year. In 1097 he was exiled to Fuzhou (in modern Sichuan) by Wang Anshi's pro-New Policies faction and accused of perverted theories and evil conduct in 1101. In 1103 his books were destroyed and his teachings proscribed. When Cheng Yi died in 1107, only four people attended his funeral.

Cheng Yi focused on the development of li (Principle). According to Cheng Yi, the concept of li was the binding link between human nature, the Way, and the heart/mind. Understanding li was a matter of parsing affairs and things one at a time. Cheng Yi believed that human nature was fundamentally good and that evil was a matter of differences in qi.

The Neo-Confucians wanted ideological consistency and coherence, and they fit Confucius and Mencius to what they believed to be true. The fact that their reading of the Analects of Confucius differed in important ways from earlier interpretations, for example, does not mean they were wrong, but it does show that they had departed from the received tradition. The conclusion I reach from the contradiction between historical and philosophical approaches to Confucianism is that it is not possible retrospectively to define the essence of Confucianism as a doctrine or a practice through all of history. Others have resolved this by writing a history of Confucianism as an unfolding tradition constituted by all the major Ru through history. What we can say is that, beginning with the Cheng brothers, the Neo-Confucians associated being a Ru with a commitment to ideology, and that they juxtaposed this with what they saw as the false ways of being a Ru prevalent in their age: Classical studies and literary composition.

— Peter K. Bol

==== Zhu Xi (1130-1200) ====
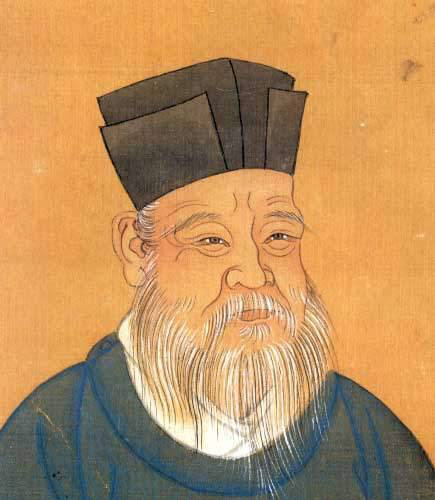
Zhu Xi (1130-1200)

Zhu Xi (1130-1200) was born in Fujian. He lost his father at the age of 13. Two of his three mentors and his two brothers also died during his teenage years. Zhu passed the national examinations at the age of 19, but his early achievement did not lead to a distinguished official career. He only held a few local posts and served at the imperial court for 46 days. In his 20s, Zhu returned to Confucian studies and it was during this time that he became increasingly hostile towards Buddhism and Taoism. He condemned Song Confucian scholars for corrupting the Classics with ideas drawn from the two religions. Zhu presented himself as the spiritual heir to Confucius while emphasizing reading and investigation as the paths to self improvement as a person and not as a scholar or to advance one's knowledge. Zhu characterized "humaneness" as the "virtue of the mind" and the "principles of love."

Zhu synthesized previous Neo-Confucian teachings in his refutation of the Buddhist idea of emptiness. Zhu conceptualized the world as a combination of li and qi. The qi was the material force while li, which Heaven endowed upon humans at birth, was human nature (qing). Evil arose from qi because qi was in flux and became clouded and obscured, while the mind/heart represented the purest qi and was responsible for self-cultivation so the qi could reflect humanity's inherent goodness. In other words, the human mind had to be conformed to the moral mind.

While Zhu Xi died while his teachings and commentaries were banned by the government, they later became part of the imperial examinations' core curriculum, and Neo-Confucianism would itself become state orthodoxy in 1241.

The master arose early every morning and would emerge from his chamber after all the students attending the academy had dressed, rung the bell, and gone to the image hall to await him. After they opened the door, the master ascended the hall, and led the students, in their proper ranks, in paying obeisance and lighting incense. He paid obeisance again and withdrew. One of the students would be sent to burn incense and pay reverence to the earth god’s shrine. Afterwards, accompanying our Master and ascending into the chamber, we would pay reverence to the Former Sage/Former Teacher and then sit in the academy’s study hall.

— Zhu Xi's students describing paying homage to Confucian worthies and sages, from Zhuzi yulei (Zhu Xi's Classified Conversations)

==== Lu Jiuyuan (1139-1192) ====
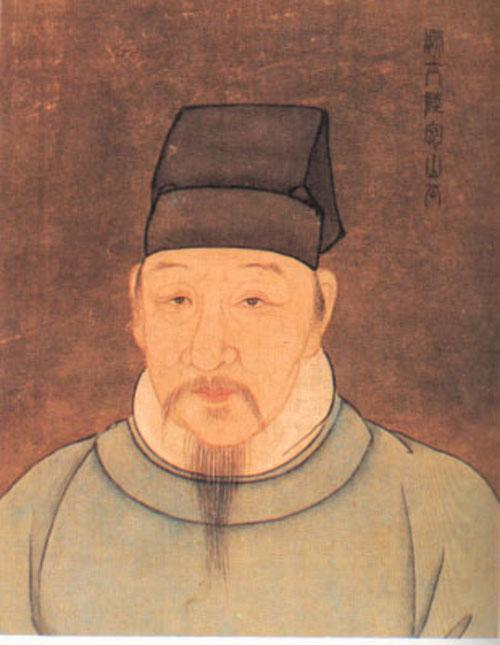
Lu Jiuyuan (1139-1192)

Lu Jiuyuan (1139-1192) was the sixth son in an elite militia family. He grew up repeatedly hearing about the tragedy of the Jingkang Incident, which caused him to take up archery and horsemanship. Lu constantly visited soldiers and discussed his grand strategies for taking back Jurchen occupied territory with them. He wrote five essays describing point by point how the territory could be retaken, even attracting the attention of the emperor. After passing the provincial examinations in 1162, Lu chose not to serve as keeper of records, citing family reasons.

He passed the jinshi examination in 1172 and was appointed to the Law Code Office as reviser. In 1175, Lu met Zhu Xi and engaged in a debate on the nature of Neo-Confucianism. In 1187, Lu was appointed to oversee the Veneration of the Way Monastery, which allowed him to return to his hometown of Jinqi (in modern Jiangxi). During his time there, Lu attracted a large following. In 1191, he was appointed prefect of Jingmen Commandery (in modern Hubei). Lu Jiuyuan died the following year.

Lu Jiuyuan regarded the heart/mind as innately good and insisted that the mind in itself was sufficient to achieve self-cultivation. He believed that the mind was the universe itself and thus external stimuli, such as books, were unnecessary. One only needed introspection and contemplation. Unlike Zhu Xi, who believed in the thorough examination of the external world to achieve self-cultivation, Lu thought that "self-realisation of the most enlightened kind is never at a great remove from what and who we ourselves already are."

=== Critics ===
==== Chen Liang (1143-1194) ====
Chen Liang was a friend of Zhu Xi. He criticized Zhu's ideals for being too unrealistic and unsuitable for the geopolitical reality of the Southern Song. Chen believed that the world was more empirically complex than Zhu's system portrayed. Chen said that he simply did not agree with "joining together principles and [complex] affairs [as neatly and artificially] as if they were barrel hoops."

== See also ==
- Islam during the Song dynasty

== Bibliography ==
- Angle, Stephen C. (2017), Neo-Confucianism: A Philosophical Introduction
- Bol, Peter K. (2008), Neo-Confucianism in History
- Buswell, Robert E. (2004), Encyclopedia of Buddhism
- Chen, Yaoting. "Zhengyi." in Fabrizio Pregadio, ed., The Encyclopedia of Taoism (London: Routledge, 2008), 1258–1260.
- Drechsler, Wolfgang (2013), Wang Anshi and the origins of modern public management in Song Dynasty China
- Ebrey, Patricia (1993), Religion and Society in T'ang and Sung China
- Hsu, Dau-Lin (1970), THE MYTH OF THE "FIVE HUMAN RELATIONS" OF CONFUCIUS
- Julch, Thomas (2013), Wang Anshi's "Treatise on Great Men"
- Kuhn, Dieter (2009), The Age of Confucian Rule
- Lagerwey, John (2010), China: A Religious State
- Lagerwey, John (2019), Paradigm Shifts in Early and Modern Chinese Religion
- Miles, Steven B. (2006), Establishing Authority through Scholarship
- Tillman, Hoyt Cleveland (2020), Some Reflections on Confucian Academies in China
- Walton, Linda (1993), Southern Sung Academies as Sacred Places
- Wilkinson, Endymion (2012), Chinese History: A New Manual, Harvard University Asia Center for the Harvard-Yenching Institute
- Wood, Alan T. (1995), Limits to Autocracy
- Yao, Xinzhong (2003), The Encyclopedia of Confucianism
- Zhao, Xuan (2017), Wang Anshi's economic reforms: proto-Keynesian economic policy in Song China
