= Wenwanggua =

Method of interpreting the results of I Ching divination

Wen Wang Gua (Chinese: 文王卦; pinyin: Wén Wáng Guà) is a method of interpreting the results of I Ching divination that was first described in writing by Jing Fang in Han dynasty China. It is based on correlating trigrams to the Celestial Stems and Earthly Branches of the Chinese calendar, and then using the stem and branch elements to interpret the lines of the trigrams and hexagrams of the I Ching. The method is popular in South East Asia. It is known by various names: (Liu Yao) (six lines divination) refers to the fact that it interprets the meaning of six symbols; the Najia method, indicates its logic of elemental values derived from the Chinese calendar; Huo Zhu Lin (火珠林), or the Fire Pearl Forest method, refers to a classical textual tradition associated with this form of divination; Wu Xing Yi (changes of the five elements); or Wen Wang Ke (Lessons of King Wen).

Despite being the mainstream method of practical I Ching divination in China, Wen Wang Gua and the Na Jia system were largely absent from major English-language translations of the I Ching throughout the twentieth century. Richard Wilhelm, in his appendix on the coin oracle, acknowledged the existence of this system, noting that there is "yet another kind of coin oracle, employing, besides the hexagrams of the I Ching, the 'five stages of change,' the cyclic signs, etc." He described it as a practice "used by Chinese soothsayers" and characterized it as a perpetuation of the ancient tortoise oracle that was "gradually supplanted by the I Ching." This characterization is not consistent with the system's continued and widespread use in Chinese divinatory practice.

== History ==
The name Wen Wang Gua means "King Wen's fortune telling hexagrams" (or trigrams, since gua can mean either hexagram or trigram). King Wen of Zhou and his son are traditionally said to be the authors of the I Ching. The elemental correspondences of the trigrams were not originally part of the tradition associated with King Wens name, but may have been based on a trigram sequence described in the Eighth Wing (one of the Ten Wings, a series of appendixes to the I Ching which are usually ascribed to Confucius). That the use of element correlation theories was relevant at the time can be seen from the extant records, such as the Luxuriant Dew of the Spring and Autumn Annals, a compilation of earlier texts which was attributed to Dong Zhongshu. As one modern researcher remarks: "Dong Zhongshu is generally remembered as the author of a detailed system of correspondences in which everything was correlated to one of the five fundamental forces, so that everything could be shown to be interrelated in an orderly and comprehensible manner." Jing Fang and his teacher, the author of the "Forest of Changes by Jiao", were among the first to apply this form of correlative thinking to I Ching divination.

=== Trigram values ===
This is the text from section 5 of the Eighth Wing, an appendix to the I Ching, which relates the trigrams to the seasons of the year, and indirectly to the elements:

God comes forth in Kan (to His producing work); He brings (His processes) into full and equal action in Sun; they are manifested to one another in Li; the greatest service is done for Him in Khwan; He rejoices in Tui; He struggles in Khien; He is comforted and enters into rest in Khan; and He completes (the work of the year) in Kǎn.

Kan and Sun (☳ and ☴) correlate with wood, the first of the elements in the Chinese calendar, then Li (☲) with fire, Khwan (☷) with earth, Tui and Khien (☱ and ☰) with metal, and Khan (☵) with water. Thus the elements appear in their generating sequence, which correlates with the seasons of the year and the trigrams. The Kăn trigram (☶), correlating with earth, has been placed at the end of the sequence because in it is said that God has completed His work, and this must appear to us at the end, even if from the point of view His relation with creation the work was actually complete after Khwan, after the greatest service is done for Him and before He does His own rejoicing and struggling.

Section 2 of the Eighth Wing relates line positions top, middle and bottom to Heaven, Man and Earth respectively. Although traditionally attributed to Fu Xi, Shao Yong's binary or lexicographical order first appears in the eleventh century AD:

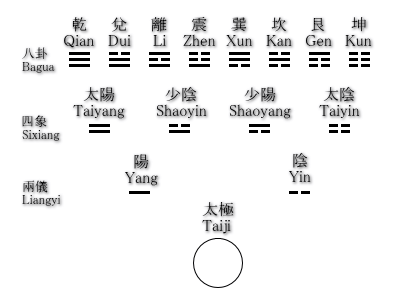

Element	metal		fire	wood		water	earth	
Trigrams	☰	☱	☲	☳	☴	☵	☶	☷
Trigram hanzi	乾	兌	離	震	巽	坎	艮	坤
Trigram pinyin	qián	duì	lí	zhèn	xùn	kǎn	gèn	kūn

=== Jing Fang ===
Larry James Schulz writes in his dissertation Lai Chih-Te, (1525-1604) and the phenomenology of the “Classic of Change” (Yìjīng):

"Jīng Fáng’s is the name associated with the earliest appearance of numerous other explanatory and integrative devices, among them the systematic application of a hexagram’s “nuclear trigrams (hùtǐ 互體 or zhōngyáo 中爻)” – lines two through four and three through five separately considered – to expound the hexagram’s verbal properties; the “Eight Palaces (bā gōng 八宮)” system of arranging hexagrams (...); and incorporation of the Five Phases (wǔxíng 五行), the “heavenly stems (tiāngān 天干)”, and the “earthly branches (dìzhī 地支)” designations to amplify the Change’s linear figures in what is called the “nàjiǎ 納甲” theory."

More about this system can be found in Fung Yu-lan’s A History of Chinese Philosophy, Volume II.

=== Line values ===
Jing Fang assigns stem and branch elements to the lines of the trigrams (the trigrams as a whole already had their own element correspondences). The correspondences of the trigrams for the Celestial stems and Earthly Branches below indicate the elements for each line of the trigrams, as opposed to the trigrams as a whole.

Recent English-language discussion of Wen Wang Gua translation methodology has emphasized that its technical terms, charting structure, stems and branches, and case reasoning function as parts of a systematic divination framework rather than ordinary vocabulary.

Celestial stem	Trigram	Element
Jia 甲	☰	wood
Yi 乙	☷	wood
Bing 丙	☶	fire
Ding 丁	☱	fire
Wu 戊	☵	earth
Ji 己	☲	earth
Geng 庚	☳	metal
Xin 辛	☴	metal
Ren 壬	☰	water
Gui 癸	☷	water

The Earthly Branches correspondences can best be understood in terms of hexagrams made by doubling a trigram. The trigram assigned to a branch (as shown below) is used as a starting point for a yang or yin sequence of elements, depending on the yin or yang value of the trigram. For example, ☳ is a yang trigram, so the line elements of the hexagram made by doubling it (number 51) are water, wood, earth, fire, metal, and earth, corresponding to the yang sequence of branches beginning with Rat. According to the celestial stems, each line of the hexagram also corresponds to metal. The line elements of yin trigrams are determined in the same way, except that the sequence is inverted (backward). Thus, for example, the lines of hexagram number 2, made by doubling the ☷ trigram, are earth, fire, wood, earth, water, and metal. In the case of trigrams ☰ and ☷, because they appear twice in the celestial stems, they have the value of their first appearance when on the bottom, or their next appearance when on the top. Accordingly, the lines of the bottom trigram for hexagram 2 are wood and the lines of the top trigram are water.

The line elements of the other hexagrams, which are not made of doubled trigrams but a combination of them, are determined by combining the trigrams already obtained. To use the same example, the line elements of hexagram 24, made by ☳ at the bottom and ☷ at the top, are exactly the same as those of the bottom trigram of hexagram 51 for the bottom trigram, and those of the top trigram of hexagram 2 for the top one.

	Earthly Branch	Mandarin (Pinyin)	Chinese zodiac	Trigram	Element
1	子	zǐ	Rat	☰,☳	water
2	丑	chǒu	Ox	☴	earth
3	寅	yín	Tiger	☵	wood
4	卯	mǎo	Rabbit	☲	wood
5	辰	chén	Dragon	☶	earth
6	巳	sì	Snake	☱	fire
7	午	wǔ	Horse	yang	fire
8	未	wèi	Goat	☷	earth
9	申	shēn	Monkey	yang	metal
10	酉	yǒu	Rooster	yin	metal
11	戌	xū	Dog	yang	earth
12	亥	hài	Pig	yin	water

== Eight houses / Eight Palaces of trigrams ==
Eight houses/palaces (卦宮 Guàgōng) is a way of assigning the elements to the hexagrams. This is used to identify the line which contains the same element as the hexagram, as a whole, and to establish an ordered relationship among the lines of the hexagram. There are various ways of arranging the houses in relation to each other.

Each house/palace begins with a hexagram made by doubling a trigram. Then lines 1 thru 5 are changed to produce the first 6 hexagrams. Next the fourth line of hexagram 6 is changed to produce hexagram 7. Changing the first three lines of hexagram 7 produces hexagram 8. These eight hexagrams are of the same element as the original hexagram that was made by doubling a trigram.

For example, the house of the first hexagram is:

== Mei Hua Yi ==
Associated with the name of Shao Yong, the Mei Hua Yi ("Plum Blossom", "Plum Blossom Numerology" or "Plum Flower Changes") system uses actual Chinese calendar date numbers to obtain hexagrams. The interpretation of them however relies on the Wen Wang Gua trigram values rather than the line values.

== Ho Lo Li Shu ==
Also said to originate with Shao Yong, the Ho Lo Li Shu (Ho Map Li Writing) system is in a sense the opposite of Mei Hua, in that it is the Wen Wang Gua calendar correspondences of trigrams that are used to obtain the hexagrams. It is a complex numerical system, with its own unique way of interpreting the results.
