= Wuming gong zhuan =

Wuming gong zhuan (simplified Chinese: 无名公传; traditional Chinese: 無名公傳; pinyin: Wúmíng gōng zhuàn; Wade–Giles: Wu-ming kung chuan, “Biography of Mr. Nameless” or “Biography of Mr. No-Name”) is a classical literary work of the xiaoshuo genre by the prominent Northern Song philosopher and scholar Shao Yong 邵雍 (1011–1077).

== Work ==
In this autobiographically inflected text, Shao Yong portrays himself under the pseudonym “Mr. Nameless” (无名公, Wuming gong or also Wuming jun 无名君 "Nameless Lord"). He reflects on his way of life, characterized by simplicity, withdrawal from political affairs, and a profound understanding of the cosmic order (Taiji).

The work is preserved in major sources such as the Shao Yong quanji 邵雍全集 (Complete Works of Shao Yong), the Shaozi quanshu 邵子全书, and the Shaoshi yishu wuzhong 邵氏遗书五种. Among these, the Shaozi quanshu 邵子全书, edited in the Ming dynasty by Xu Bida 徐必达, is regarded as a particularly comprehensive collection of Shao Yong's works.

Both the Qing-period Zhuozhou zhi 涿州志 ("Chronicle of Zhuozhou") and the Huangchao wenjian 皇朝文鉴 ("The best examples of literature from Our Dynasty") compiled by Lü Zuqian in the Southern Song quote the text. A historical dispute existed regarding Shao Yong's birthplace, between Zhuozhou 涿州 in Hebei and a location in Henan. It is now generally assumed that Shao Yong's birthplace was in present-day Linzhou (formerly Linxian 林县) in Henan (the historical Hengzhang).

The text is included in various collections such as the Shuofu (说郛), for example the edition used by the Hanyu da zidian published by the Commercial Press.

The biographical section of Alain Arrault's monograph on Shao Yong concludes with a presentation and translation of the Wuming gong zhuan (Chapter III).

== See also ==
- Taiji (philosophy)

== Bibliography ==
- Shao Yong 邵雍: Wuming gong zhuan 无名公传. Shuofu 说郛 (Shangwu yinshuguan 商务印书馆)
