= Ma Yize =

10th-century astronomer

Ma Yize (traditional: 馬依澤; simplified: 马依泽; July 29, 921–June 19, 1005) was a Muslim Hui astronomer and calendrist of Arab origin, who worked as the chief director of the astronomical bureau for the Song dynasty from 961 to 997. During these decades he introduced aspects of Islamic astronomy into China, and became a hereditary noble for his service. His descendants continued to serve in China for the next millennium, producing almost 100 officials and generals.

== Origins ==
Ma Yize was born on of 20th of Le Bi A Ao Wu Li Yue, (Note: 勒比阿敖勿里) a unique Chinese transliteration of Rabi`-ul-Awwal, corresponding to July 29, 921, into a family which descended from one of the companions of the Prophet. His original name in Arabic may have been Ismail or Ma'iz (مائز). Upon settling in China, he adopted the Chinese courtesy name Yu Sou (渔叟), meaning Old Fisherman.

The sources state he was from "Lumu", which has been interpreted in different ways by scholars. Some suggest it refers to Rumi (Anatolia), while other records like those regarding the early Ming astronomer, Ma Sha Yi Hei, who was also from Lumu, identify it as "zhun di dai (准地带)", which refers to the port Jeddah, 60 kilometres from "Man Kai" (Mecca).:16 Or it may refer to northeastern Yemen or Oman.

== Career ==
Ma Yize came to China in 960 or 961 at the age of 40, at the head of a trade delegation - these usually doubled as envoys. At Kaifeng, the Song capital, he was received by Emperor Taizu of Song (960-976) and joined the Song Astronomical Bureau, which then employed 120 staff members, including 36 timekeeping and 30 astrology students. Here he worked with Wang Chune, who had joined the Astronomical Bureau in 947, creating a new calendar for Chai Rong of the previous Later Zhou Dynasty in 951-3. Over the next 2 years Ma Yize assisted Wang in creating the Ying Tian Li Calendar (Calendar of Corresponding Heavens). This calendar served as the empire's official standard for calendrical calculations between 963-982.

With the completion of the Ying Tian Li calendar in 963, he was promoted as the Chief Director of the Royal Astronomy Bureau. Due to his service, he was awarded an imperial commendation handwritten by the Emperor himself, one of the highest praises possible in China, and was granted by imperial decree the hereditary noble title of Marquis as well as the prestige titles of "Grandee of the Brilliant Bounty" (光禄大夫) and "Right Pillar of the State" (右柱国) on September 30, 966, (Note: 马依泽公,于建隆七年丙寅八月十三日,诰授世袭侯爵,兼钦天监,光禄大夫右柱国。) or perhaps later by Emperor Taizong (976-997). In 982, Wang Chune held the position of Chief Director, but after his death in the same year, it once again returned to Ma Yize, who held the position for the next 15 years until his retirement in 997, after which the position was held by his son.

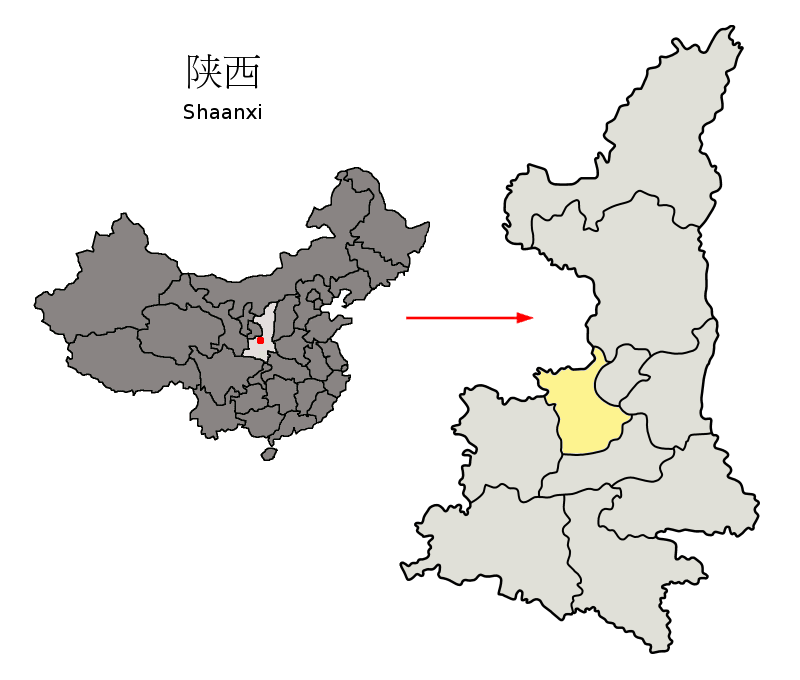
Jingyang County, Shaanxi, Where Ma Yize retired between 997-1005.

During his retirement, he settled in a place called Yong An (永安镇) in Jingyang County, Shaanxi, due to his fondness of that region's mountains and streams. Settling there with his children. He died during the reign of Emperor Zhenzong aged 83 on June 19, 1005.

== Astronomical Contributions ==
Ma Yize's most important contribution was the introduction the 7 day week system (where each day is associated with one of the planets (Note: Sunday: Sun, Monday: Moon, Tuesday: Mars, Wednesday: Mercury, Thursday: Jupiter, Friday: Venus, Saturday: Saturn)) into the Chinese calendar for the first time in 963. This weekday system reached beyond the borders of the Song Dynasty, as far as the Golden Mountain Kingdom of Western Han in Dunhuang by 978.

Drawing upon the Solar Hijri calendar, Ma Yize also introduced the concept of solar months corresponding to the 12 Zodiac signs. This system eventually found its way into state military literature; the Wujing Zongyao (1044) contains the first recorded mention in Chinese history of the Sun entering into the 12 zodiac signs, expressed through traditional Chinese solar terms:

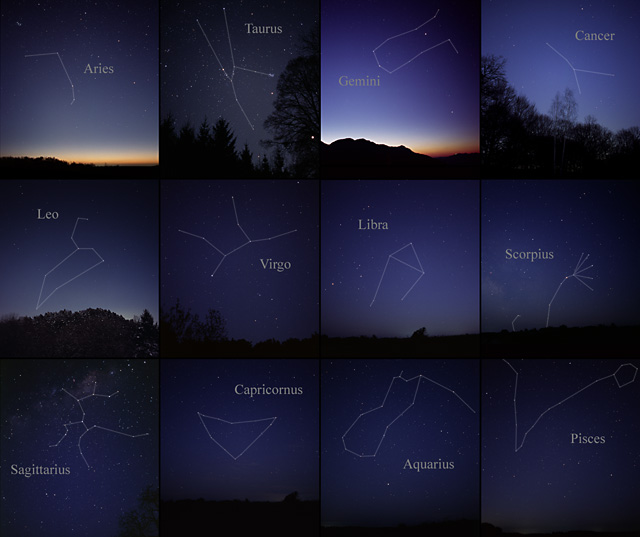
Zodiac constellations

1. Yu Shui (雨水 : Rain Water, February 18-20): 1 day later, the Sun enters Pisces.
2. Chun Fen ( 春 风 : Spring Equinox, March 19-21): 3 days later, the sun enters Aries.
3. Gu Yu (谷雨 : Grain Rain, April 19-21), 5 days later, the Sun enters Taurus.
4. Xiao Man ( 小 满 : Grain Buds, May 20-22), 5 days later, the Sun enters Gemini.
5. Xia Zhi (夏至 : Summer Solstice, June 20-22): 6 days later, the Sun enters Cancer.
6. Da Shu (大暑 : Major Heat, July 22-24): 3 days later, the Sun enters Leo.
7. Chu Shu (处暑 : End of Heat, August 22-24): 4 days later, the Sun enters Virgo.
8. Qiu Fen (秋分 : Autumn Equinox, September 22-24): 8 days later, the Sun enters Libra.
9. Shuang Jiang (霜降 : First Frost, October 23-24): 10 days later, the Sun enters Scorpius.
10. Xiao Xue (小雪 : Minor Snow, November 21-23): 8 days later, the Sun enters Sagittarius.
11. Dong Zhi ( 冬 至 : Winter Solstice, December 21-23): 4 days later, the Sun enters Capricornus.
12. Da Han ( 大 寒 : Major Cold, January 19-21): 1 day later, the Sun enters Aquarius.

Additionally, Ma Yize set the epoch of the Ying Tian Li calendar to Friday, 16th July, 622, the exact start date of the Islamic Lunar and Solar Hijri calendars. He also improved the accuracy of the calculations for solar and lunar eclipses and the orbits of the other five classical planets.

Ma Yize also introduced several texts of Islamic mathematical astronomy into China, which were more complex from a mathematical and technical standpoint than previous Indian works which had been transmitted to China. Translating several works by al-Battani (858–929):

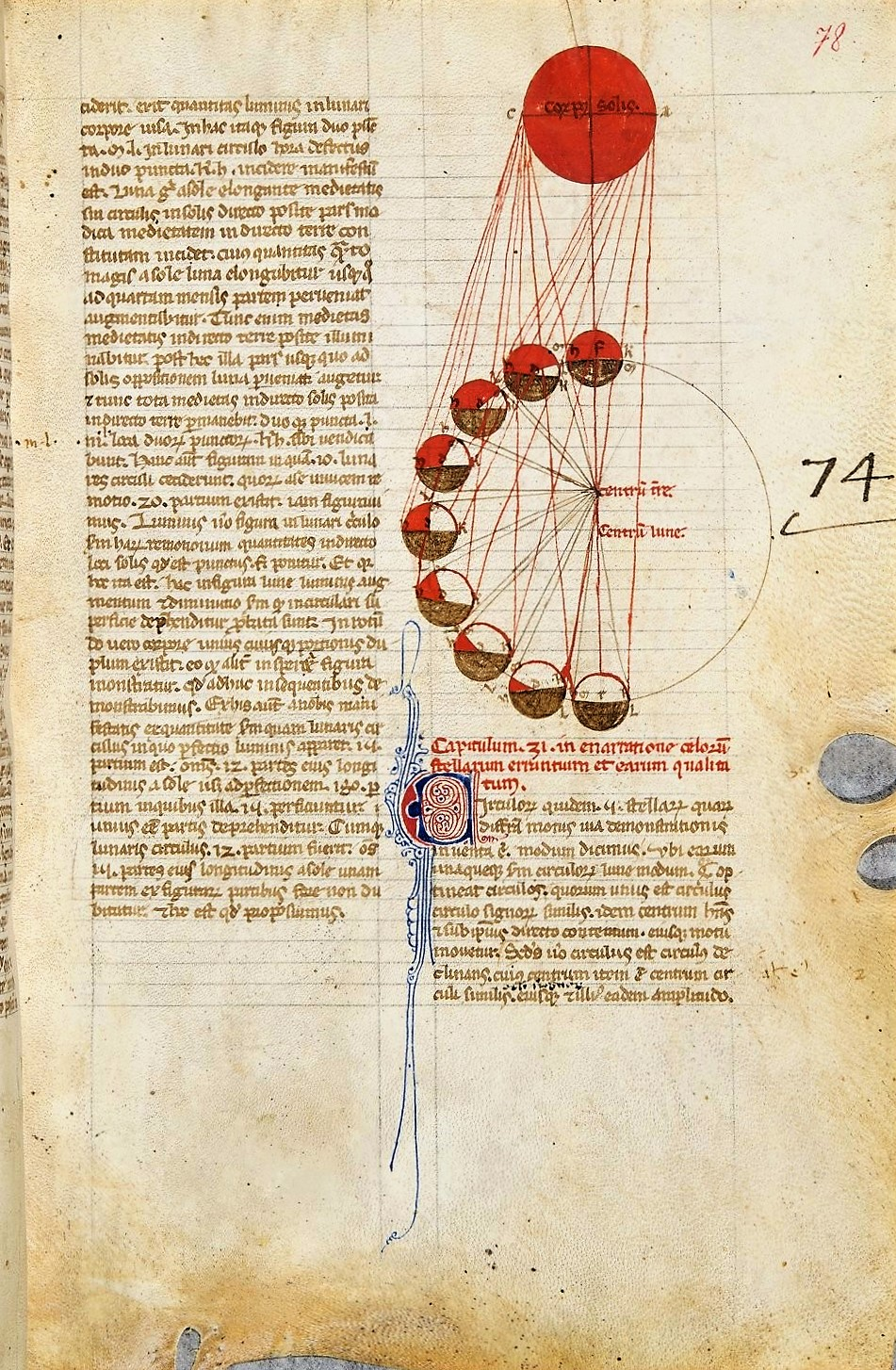
One of al-Battani's works. Ma Yize translated some of his works into Chinese.

- Kitab al-Zij [Opus astronomicum], 880
- al-Zij al-sabi [The Sabian Tables]
- Al-Battani's Treatises on Horoscopy

He may have also been influenced by Abu Muhammad al-Hasan al-Hamdani (893–945/947) and books such as:

- Kitab Matali' al-Buruj [On the Ascensions of the Signs of the Zodiac]
- Kitab Aqdar al-Ittisalat [On the Quantities of the Astrological Applications]

Consequently, these works which had a great influence on European astronomy were introduced into China almost 2 centuries before they were translated into Latin. However, despite advances in celestial mapping and planetary studies, other aspects of Islamic astronomy and the Arab-Ptolemaic system did not take root.

== Descendants ==
His descendants were a noble family of the central Shaanxi plain, but at some point they moved southeast to Huaining County, Anqing Prefecture, Anhui, where the record of the Family's lineage was discovered.

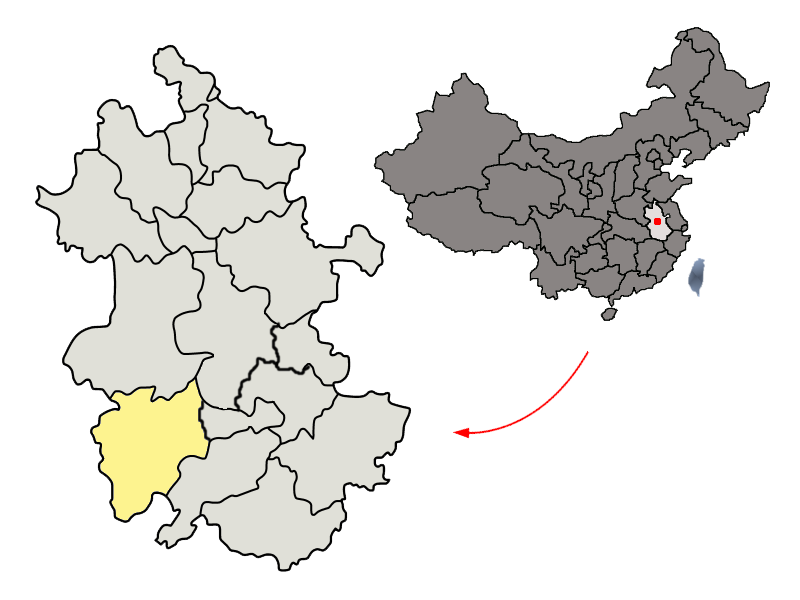
Huaining County, Anhui, where the record of the Family's lineage was discovered

Ma Yize's two sons continued to work in the Astronomical Bureau for several successive emperors. In 997, his eldest son, Ma Er (courtesy name Zhao Ming), was appointed Chief Director, while his second son, Ma Huai (courtesy name Wang Yue), became Vice Director in 1001. His third son, Ma Yi (Courtesy name Si Ming), became a general in 1021 with the title of "General of Dragon and Tiger", he continued to progress through the ranks, until he became Vice Commander of the Royal Guard(护军副总兵). This military influence likely lead to the inclusion of the Zodiac signs in 1044 military text, Wujing zongyao.

In the year 1000, Ma Yize's grandson, Ma Wencheng, passed the provincial examination, attaining the rank of Juren. Among Ma Yize's 4th generation descendants, there were 3 who had attained the highest rank of Jinshi, 1 Juren, and one official of a prefecture. Overall, down to the late 1800s, the 31 generations of Ma Yize's family produced 44 degree holders and over 90 officials in the state and military. With 15 military degree holders during the 18th-early 19th centuries. Even a millennium later, the family still consistently identified as Muslim.
