= Shao Yong =

Chinese philosopher (1011–1077)

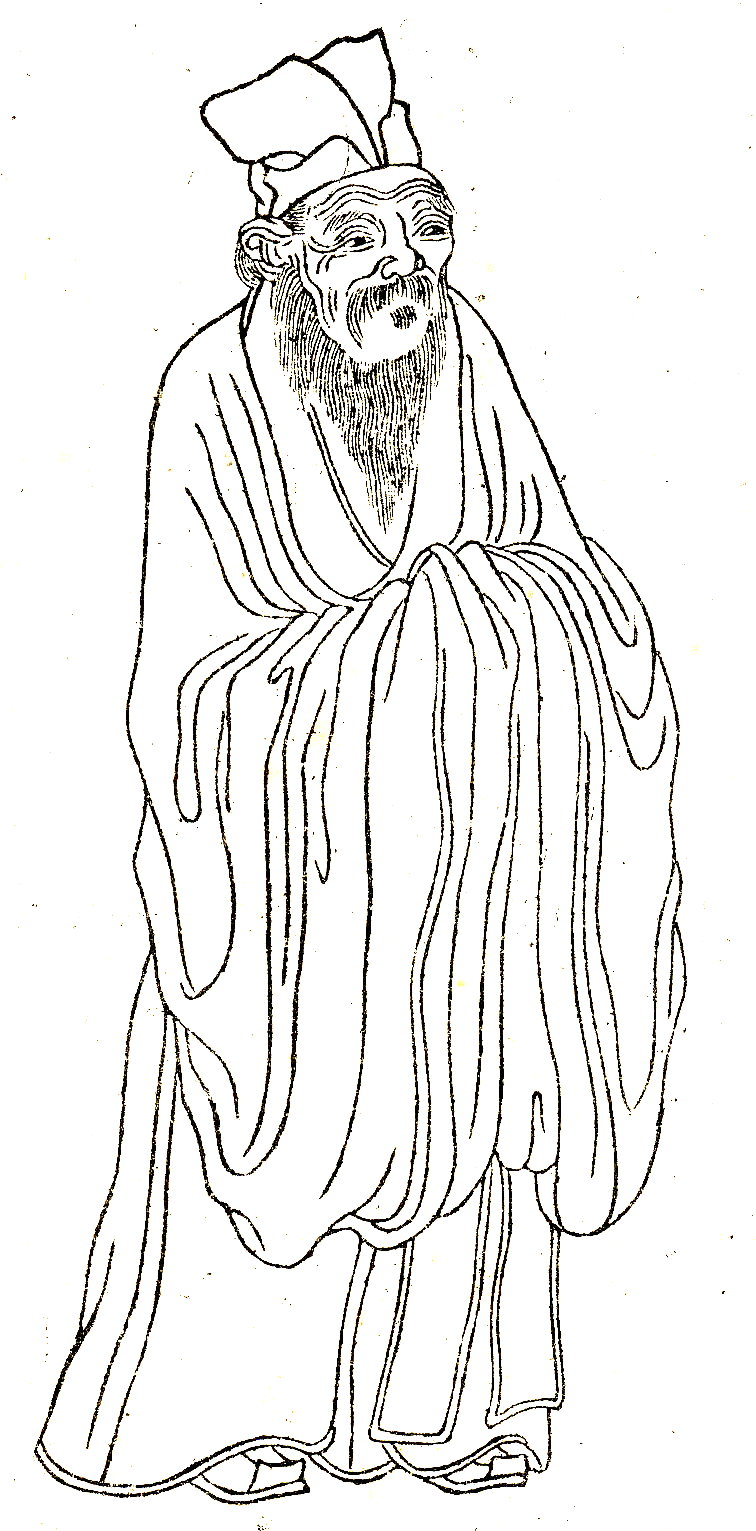
Shao Yong

Shao Yong (Chinese: 邵雍; pinyin: Shào Yōng; Wade–Giles: Shao Yung; 1011–1077), courtesy name Yaofu (堯夫), named Shào Kāngjié (邵康節) was a Chinese cosmologist, historian, philosopher, and poet who greatly influenced the development of Neo-Confucianism across China during the Song dynasty.

Shao is considered one of the most learned men of his time. Unlike most men of such stature in his society, Shao avoided governmental positions his entire life, but his influence was no less substantial. He wrote an influential treatise on cosmogony, the Huangji Jingshi (皇極經世, Book of Supreme World Ordering Principles).

== Origins ==
Shao's ancestors were from Fanyang. He was born in 1011 in an area known as Hengzhang county (衡漳, now Anyang, Henan) to Shao Gu (邵古, 986–1064) and Lady Li (李氏, d. 1032 or 1033). Shao's mother, Li, was an extremely devout practitioner of Buddhism. This link with Buddhism proved to be a major influence on Shao's thought throughout his life.

Shao Yong's first teacher was Shao Gu, his father. This was common practice in the familial environment of China at the time. Shao Gu was a scholar in philology and his influence can be discerned in Shao's literary works. Guided by his father, he studied the Six Confucian classics intensively at a young age. Shao also sought out the scholarship of private schools, many of which were run by monks and heavily influenced by Buddhism.

Around 1020, the Shao family moved to Gongcheng county (now Xinxiang, Henan). Shortly after his mother's death in 1032 or 1033. Shao met his most important teacher, Li Zhicai (李之才). Li was a former pupil of ancient prose specialist Mu Xiu (穆修, 979–1032). Under Mu Xiu, Li had studied the I Ching extensively.

== Career and later life ==
Shao was a member of a group of thinkers who gathered in Luoyang toward the last three decades of the 11th century. This group had two primary objectives. One of these was to draw parallels between their own streams of thought and that of Confucianism (儒教) as understood by Mencius.

Secondly, the men set out to undermine any links, real or otherwise, between 4th-century Confucianism and what they viewed as inferior philosophical schools of thinking, namely Buddhism and Taoism. Other loosely connected members of this so-called network of thinkers include: Cheng Yi, Zhang Zai, Cheng Hao (程顥, 1032–1085) and Zhou Dunyi. Central to each of these men was the ancient text I Ching, which each had studied closely. The way in which Shao studied this ancient text, however, differed from the other members.

During the Song Dynasty, there were two main approaches in I Ching studies. Together with the majority of scholars, the other members of the group took the yili xue (義理學, "principle study") approach, which was based on literalistic and moralistic concepts. The other approach, taken by Shao alone, was the xiangshu xue (象數學, "image-number study") approach, which was based much more on iconographic and cosmological concepts. An approach to I Ching divination known as Mei Hua Yi has been attributed to him.

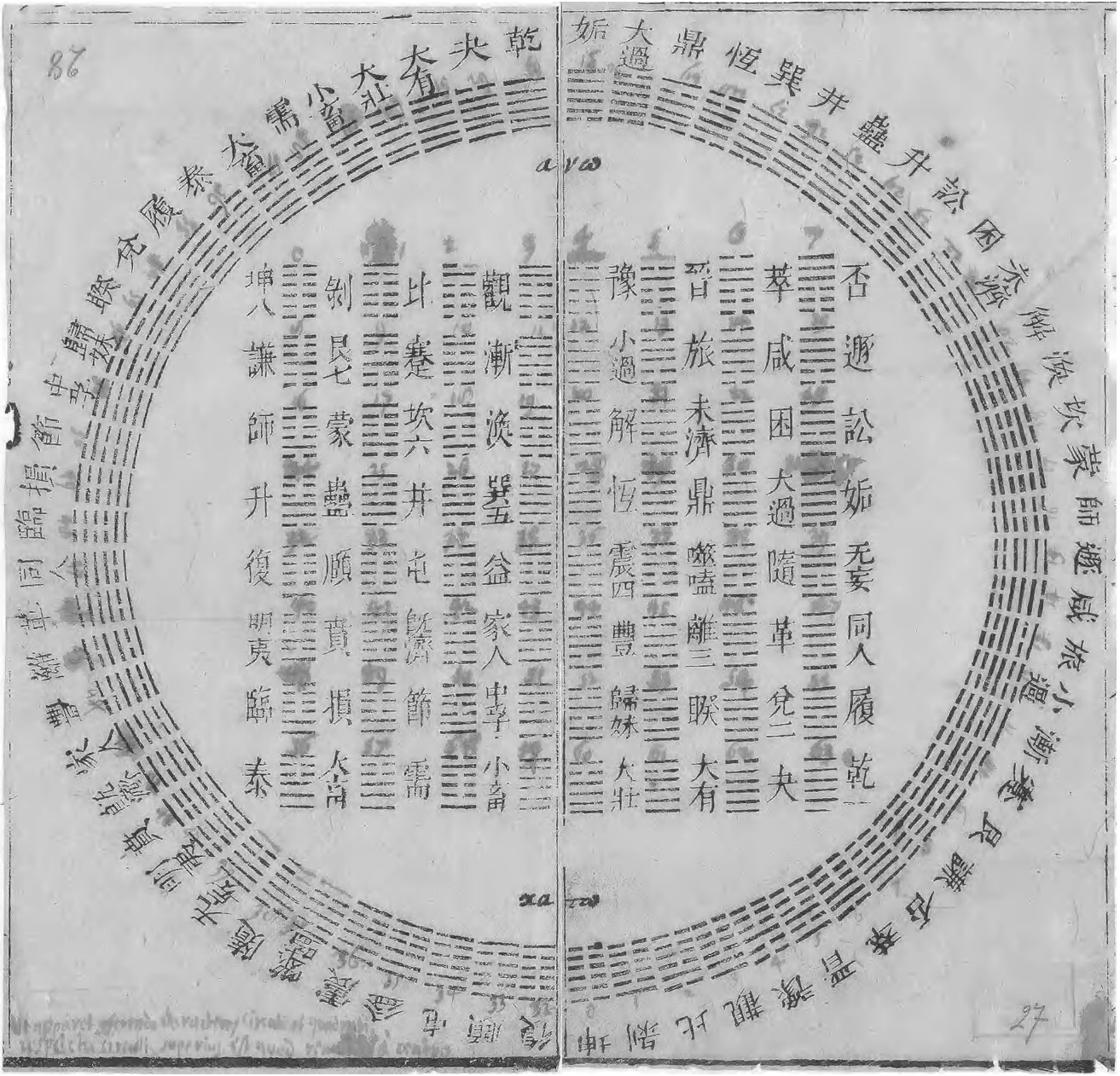
I Ching, 64 Hexagrams in binary sequence

Sima Guang (a close friend of Shao Yung) edited the Taixuanjing by Yang Xiong (written in 10 AD). Influenced by the Base 3 number system found in the Taixuanjing, Shao Yong set the Hexagrams of the I Ching into a binary sequence (the Fu Xi Ordering). This in turn influenced Leibniz and his thinking on binary arithmetic, and in turn the language of modern computers.

== Descendants ==
Shao Yong's offspring held the title of Wujing Boshi (五经博士; 五經博士; Wǔjīng Bóshì).

In 1452 Wujing Boshi was bestowed upon the offspring of Mengzi-Meng Xiwen 孟希文 56th generation and Yan Hui-Yan Xihui 顔希惠 59th generation, the same was bestowed on the offspring of Zhou Dunyi-Zhou Mian 週冕 12th generation, the two Cheng brothers (Cheng Hao and Cheng Yi-Chen Keren 程克仁 17th generation), Zhu Xi-Zhu Ting 朱梴 (Zhu Chan?) 9th generation, in 1456–1457, in 1539 the same was awarded to Zeng Can's offspring-Zeng Zhicui 曾質粹 60th generation, in 1622 the offspring of Zhang Zai received the title and in 1630 the offspring of Shao Yong.

== Poetry ==
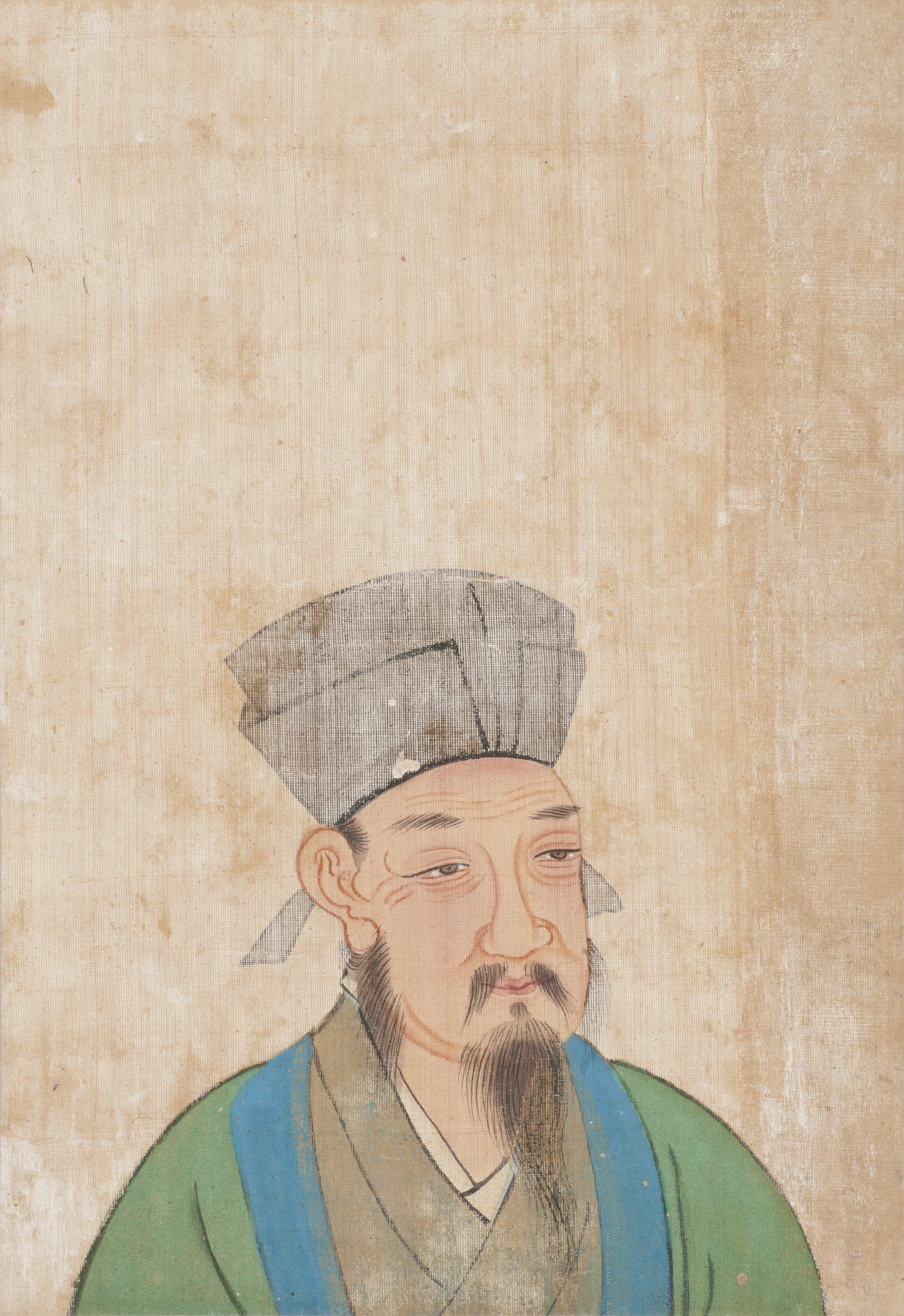
As depicted in the album Portraits of Famous Men c. 1900, housed in the Philadelphia Museum of Art

Shao is also famous for his poetry and for his interest in the game of Go (wéiqí). He wrote a Great Ode to Watching Wéiqí (觀棋大吟), one of the longest surviving classical Chinese poems, as well as a Long Ode to Watching Wéiqí (觀棋長吟), which is translated below.

Long Ode to Watching Weiqi

In a quiet courtyard in the spring, with evening's light filtering through the leaves,
guests relax on the veranda and watch as two compete at wéiqí.
Each calls into themselves the divine and the infernal,
sculpting mountains and rivers into their world.
Across the board, dragons and serpents array for battle,
geese scatter as collapsing fortresses are sacked;
masses die, pushed into pits by Qin's soldiers,
and the drama's audience is left in awe of its General Jin.
To sit at the board is to raise halberd and taste combat,
to endure the freezing and brave the flames in the constant changes;
life and death each will come to both masters,
but victory and defeat must each go to one.
On this road, one strips away the other's disguises,
in life, one must erect one's own facade;
dreadful is a wound to the exposed belly or heart,
merely painful is an injury to the face, which can be cured;
Effective is a blow that strikes home in an opponent's back,
successful are schemes that use repeated feints and deceit.
Look at the activity on the streets of our capital,
if you were to go elsewhere, wouldn't it be the same?

Shao Yong

== See also ==
- Wuming gong zhuan
- History of the Song Dynasty
- Wen Wang Gua

== Notes ==
a: The shorter "Long Ode" is available at this Chinese source
