= Day master =

The day stem in Chinese Four Pillars astrology

Chinese name
- Traditional Chinese: 日主
- Simplified Chinese: 日主
- Literal meaning: day master
Transcriptions
Standard Mandarin
- Hanyu Pinyin: rìzhǔ

Day stem
- Traditional Chinese: 日干
- Simplified Chinese: 日干
Transcriptions
Standard Mandarin
- Hanyu Pinyin: rìgān

Korean name
- Hangul: 일간
Transcriptions
- Revised Romanization: ilgan

Japanese name
- Kanji: 日干
Transcriptions
- Romanization: nikkan

The Day Master (Chinese: 日主; pinyin: rìzhǔ; lit. 'day master'), also called the day stem (Chinese: 日干; pinyin: rìgān) or day element (Chinese: 日元; pinyin: rìyuán), is the Heavenly Stem occupying the day pillar of a Four Pillars of Destiny chart. In this Chinese astrological system it denotes the subject of the reading — the person whose chart is being cast — and supplies the reference point against which every other character in the chart is interpreted.

A Four Pillars chart consists of four stem–branch pairs drawn from the sexagenary cycle, covering the year, month, day and hour of birth, for a total of eight characters (Chinese: 八字; pinyin: bāzì; lit. 'eight characters'). Of those eight, only one — the upper character of the day pillar — is the Day Master. The remaining seven are not read for their own sake but for the relationship each bears to it, so the Day Master is functionally the origin of the coordinate system rather than one datum among eight.

== Terminology ==
Rìzhǔ (日主) combines 日 "day" with 主 "host, master, principal", and is the term most common in modern Chinese-language practice. Rìgān (日干, "day stem") is the neutral structural description and is preferred where the emphasis is on chart construction rather than interpretation; rìyuán (日元, "day origin") also occurs. The corresponding terms are ilgan (일간, 日干) in the Korean Saju tradition and nikkan (日干) in Japanese Shichū Suimei (四柱推命).

In English-language writing the calque "Day Master" predominates; "day stem" and "self element" are also found.

== Determination ==
The Day Master is fixed by the day pillar, which is read off a continuous count of days through the sexagenary cycle. Unlike the year and month pillars, the day pillar has no astronomical marker and is not reset by any calendar event: it advances by one of the sixty stem–branch pairs each day without interruption, so establishing it is a matter of counting from a known epoch rather than of calculation. Because the cycle of stems has length ten and the day count is continuous, each of the ten stems falls on one day in ten.

=== The day boundary ===
Which day a birth belongs to is not settled by the civil midnight. Chinese timekeeping divides the day into twelve double-hours, of which the first, the zi hour (Chinese: 子時; pinyin: zǐshí), runs from 23:00 to 01:00 and therefore straddles midnight. Schools differ over whether a birth in the 23:00–24:00 half has already entered the following day: under the "early zi" convention it has, under the "late zi" convention it has not. The two readings give different day pillars and hence different Day Masters for the same birth.

A second discrepancy arises from the clock used. Some practitioners locate the zi boundary in local civil time and others in apparent solar time corrected for the birth longitude and the equation of time, which can displace the boundary by up to about a quarter of an hour either way. The two conventions are independent, so a birth near 23:00 may be assigned any of several Day Masters depending on which pair of choices a given calculator implements — a frequent source of disagreement between published charts and online tools, which commonly do not state which convention they follow.

== The ten Day Masters ==
The Day Master is always one of the ten Heavenly Stems, each of which carries a fixed Five Phase element and a fixed yin and yang polarity:

Stem	Pinyin	Element	Polarity
甲	jiǎ	Wood	Yang
乙	yǐ	Wood	Yin
丙	bǐng	Fire	Yang
丁	dīng	Fire	Yin
戊	wù	Earth	Yang
己	jǐ	Earth	Yin
庚	gēng	Metal	Yang
辛	xīn	Metal	Yin
壬	rén	Water	Yang
癸	guǐ	Water	Yin

The Day Master's element and polarity are the only two properties of it that enter the interpretive machinery; the stem's other traditional associations play no part in the derivation below.

== Role in interpretation ==
=== The Ten Gods ===
Every other stem in the chart is classified by its relationship to the Day Master under the Five Phase generating and controlling cycles, subdivided by whether its polarity matches the Day Master's. The five possible phase relations and two polarity cases yield the ten categories known as the Ten Gods (Chinese: 十神; pinyin: shíshén):

Phase relation to the Day Master	Same polarity	Opposite polarity
Same element	Friend (比肩, bǐjiān)	Rob Wealth (劫財, jiécái)
Produced by the Day Master	Eating God (食神, shíshén)	Hurting Officer (傷官, shāngguān)
Produces the Day Master	Indirect Resource (偏印, piānyìn)	Direct Resource (正印, zhèngyìn)
Controlled by the Day Master	Indirect Wealth (偏財, piāncái)	Direct Wealth (正財, zhèngcái)
Controls the Day Master	Seven Killings (七殺, qīshā)	Direct Officer (正官, zhèngguān)

The naming follows a consistent rule: a relation of opposite polarity is termed "direct" or "proper" (正), and one of matching polarity "indirect" or "lopsided" (偏), the traditional rationale being that opposed polarities interact cleanly while matching ones do not. Because the classification is defined relative to the Day Master, changing the Day Master reassigns every one of the Ten Gods in the chart; no part of a reading survives an error in the day pillar.

=== Strength ===
A reading also assesses whether the Day Master is "strong" (旺, wàng) or "weak" (弱, ruò) — that is, how much support it receives from the season of birth and from the other characters, particularly those of its own element and those producing it. The judgement governs which phases a practitioner will treat as beneficial, and is the point at which Four Pillars practice most often intersects with feng shui consultation, the two systems sharing the Five Phase framework and frequently being offered by the same practitioner.

== Regional variants ==
In Korea the system is known as Saju (사주, 四柱) and has been practised since at least the Goryeo period; the day stem is called ilgan and occupies the same interpretive position. In Japan the system is Shichū Suimei, in which the day stem (nikkan) is likewise taken as the centre from which the influence of the remaining stems and branches is surveyed. Ethnographic description of the practice in early twentieth-century China is given by Chao Wei-pang, and of its contemporary practice in Taipei, Beijing and Kaifeng by Stéphanie Homola.

== See also ==
- Four Pillars of Destiny
- Heavenly Stems
- Earthly Branches
- Sexagenary cycle
- Wuxing (Chinese philosophy)
- Yuanhai Ziping
- Traditional Chinese timekeeping

== Sources ==
- Bruun, Ole (2003). Fengshui in China: Geomantic Divination Between State Orthodoxy and Popular Religion. University of Hawaiʻi Press. ISBN 0-8248-2757-0.
- Chao, Wei-pang (1946). "The Chinese Science of Fate-Calculation". Folklore Studies. 5: 279. doi:10.2307/3182937. JSTOR 3182937.
- Ho, Peng Yoke (2003). Chinese Mathematical Astrology: Reaching Out to the Stars. Routledge. ISBN 978-0-415-86310-0.
- Homola, Stéphanie (2023). The Art of Fate Calculation: Practicing Divination in Taipei, Beijing, and Kaifeng. Berghahn Books. doi:10.3167/9781800738126. ISBN 978-1-80073-812-6.
- Yoon, Hong-Key (2006). The Culture of Fengshui in Korea: An Exploration of East Asian Geomancy. Lexington Books. ISBN 978-0-7391-1348-6.
