= Symbolic stars =

Benefic and malefic influence in Chinese astrology

In Chinese astrology, the symbolic stars, also translated as star spirits or calendar spirits, (Chinese: 神煞; pinyin: shén shā) represent beneficial and baleful influences believed to be present during particular times (including the year, month, and hour), typically in relation to the specific positions and interactions of the heavenly stems and earthly branches used in traditional Chinese timekeeping and the sexagenary cycle.

Although they do not correspond to any particular observable stars visible in the night sky, they are described in similar terms to observable astronomical objects with the actual influence of any particular symbolic star at a given moment involving multiple cosmic factors, including its relationship to other such "stars" (whether in harmony or in opposition), its phase (ascendant or descendant), its aspect, and the time of its apogee, in addition its relationship to the Five Phases and Yin and Yang which are also used to characterise the influence of observable celestial objects such as the seven luminaries.

The term "shén shā" is sometimes translated literally as "gods and devils", but in-fact they do not relate to any ghosts or celestial beings; in this case, shen (神) means beneficial influence and sha (煞) means baleful influence.

The calculation of the symbolic stars is logically connected to the Na Yin (納音) melodic elements theory, Ten Gods (十神) theory, Twelve Gods of Longevity (长生十二神), etc. The symbolic stars are like the “leaves” of the heavenly stems and earthly branches in the big tree of Chinese astrology and can provide a very specific information in the horoscope analysis.

The symbolic stars are used in many methods of Chinese astrology and metaphysics: Four Pillars of Destiny, Zi wei dou shu, Da Liu Ren, Feng Shui, Wen Wang Gua.

In Chinese astrology, there are more than 180 symbolic stars.

== See also ==
- Electional astrology
- Rishu
- Yuanhai Ziping

== Bibliography ==
- Smith, Richard (2017). "The Legacy of Daybooks in Late Imperial and Modern China". In Harper, Donald; Kalinowski, Marc (eds.). Books of Fate and Popular Culture in Early China: The Daybook Manuscripts of the Warring States, Qin, and Han. Brill. pp. 336–372. doi:10.1163/9789004349315_011. ISBN 978-90-04-34931-5.
