= Hanz Cua =

Filipino astrologer

Master Hanz Cua
- Occupation: Astrologer
- Employer: ABS-CBN
- Style: Chinese astrology: (Feng shui; Bazi; Ziwei doushu)
- Television: Umagang Kay Ganda (2015–2020); Rise and Shine Pilipinas (2023–2026); Treze Mornings (2026–present)
- Website: www.masterhanzcua.com

Hanz Cua is a Filipino fortune teller who specializes in Chinese astrology.

== Early life and education ==
Hanz Cua was born to ethnic Chinese parents in the Philippines. His grandparents were emigrants from China and his parents were only fluent in speaking Chinese. Hanz is the eldest and only son among three siblings. Cua attended Chinese schools up to the tertiary level.

Hanz would claim to be able to exhibit psychic abilities at a young age. Through his own account he is able to auras and mythical beings such as the duwende, tikbalang, and other spirits. He also learned Feng shui-based astrology from his father, whose own career in the Philippines was limited by language fluency.

Cua would be briefly work as a nurse in less than a year. He graduated with a degree in nursing and is a board exam passer. He decided against pursuing his nursing career in the United States and went on to pursue a career in astrology.

== Career ==
Hanz Cua obtained a diploma as Feng Shui Master Practitioner from an undisclosed institution. He claimed to have trained under Feng shui masters in Hong Kong, mainland China, Singapore, Malaysia, Myanmar and Thailand. Hanz Cua is also a practitioner of Bazi, and Ziwei doushu.

He was also a resident Chinese astrologer at the ABS-CBN morning show Umagang Kay Ganda.

Cua is noted for his forecast made in December 2019, that 2020 would be a "good year" for most of the Chinese zodiac animal signs. The COVID-19 pandemic occurred going against his initial forecast. Cua would point out that most Chinese astrologers in the country predicted an auspicious year and predictions are not without flaws similar to weather forecasts.
