= Double Hour =

Double hour may refer to:

- Double hour (unit), a traditional Chinese unit of time also known as a Watch
- The Double Hour, a 2009 Italian film
