= CP Lim =

Master CP Lim (Lim Chiok-Ping) is a Malaysian scholar of Taoist philosophical studies. Active in Malaysia, Singapore, China and Taiwan. He is known for his lectures and writings on traditional Chinese cultural subjects such as the I Ching, Feng shui, destiny analysis, Asian folk customs and Taoist philosophy.

In simple terms, Master CP Lim is a scholar whose expertise spans from artistic aesthetics to traditional Chinese metaphysical culture, he is widely recognized in Malaysia as a lecturer and author on Taoist culture.

== Background and expertise ==
CP Lim is the Chief Instructor of I-Ching studies, FengShui, and destiny analysis at Tiger Mansion in Johor Bahru. He is respectfully addressed as “Teacher Lim,” “Professor Lim,” or “Principal Lim.” For more than 40 years, he has provided teaching and consultation services in visual aesthetics, Tao-culture, residential FengShui, metaphysical and fortune analysis etc.

Between 1985 and 2000, he served as Dean and Principal of two major art institutions in Singapore. He holds qualifications in aesthetics education from the London University, as well as Master’s degrees in Visual Aesthetics from Middlesex University and Birmingham University in the United Kingdom.

During the same period, he also served as Honorary President and Academic Advisor to the Singapore Taoist Philosophical Society and the Singapore I-Ching Society, also as academic advisor to several I-Ching, FengShui and Buddhist organizations in Malaysia and Singapore. He was formerly an overseas professor at the Design Institute of Yunnan University in China and an overseas academic advisor to the Xi’an I-Ching Society.

== Taoist and cultural activities ==
CP Lim has been highly active within the Chinese community, frequently conducting Taoist and metaphysical courses in Singapore, Sabah, Penang and Johor Bahru. His teaching topics include residential FengShui, fortune & destiny analysis, physiognomy & palmistry, 64 hexagrams of I-Ching, Asian Chinese folk rituals and religious beliefs.

Over the years, he has also been invited to universities and international Taoist conferences in Malaysia, Singapore, China and Taiwan, to present academic papers and deliver keynote lectures on FengShui, destiny studies, and I-Ching philosophy.

In 2015, at the 27th Singapore International I-Ching Forum, his paper titled “I-Ching and Ancient & Modern FengShui Studies” received an Outstanding Paper Award. In the same year, at the 5th Taiwan Cross-Strait I-Ching Forum, his paper “Folk Spirits and the Divine Concepts in I-Ching” received an Excellent Paper Award. CP Lim has authored numerous books related to Taoist and metaphysical studies, covering topics such as the 5-Elements, Hetu & Luoshu, and I-Ching studies.

== Publications ==
CP Lim has authored numerous books related to Taoist and metaphysical studies, covering topics such as the 5-Elements, Hetu & Luoshu, and I-Ching studies.

- 1998 — Folk Almanac Date Selection and Feng Shui (Chinese)
- 2000 — I-Ching, Feng Shui, and Destiny Analysis (Chinese)
- 2002 — The Science of Feng Shui (English)
- 2007 — Secrets of the Human Face & Palm (English)
- 2009 — Practical Residential Feng Shui (Chinese)
- 2009 — Xuan Kong Flying Star Feng Shui (Chinese)
- 2010 — Chinese Name Studies (Chinese)
- 2019 — Chinese Physiognomy and Palmistry (Chinese)

== Video Lectures: website, Facebook, and YouTube ==
In 2020, CP Lim ceased publishing printed books and shifted his focus toward online educational videos. He began producing a series of lectures on Taoist studies and folk culture through platforms known as “寅居道学堂” “古学精用讲坛” “道学讲坛”. These channels share topics on Taoist philosophy, Chinese traditions and religious beliefs.

Through his website, Facebook, and YouTube platforms, he shares educational videos on topics including the Fundamentals of I-Ching, Hexagrams and fortune analysis, 甲子纳音, Asian folk rituals and titles such as the God of Wealth, spiritual & talismans, ritual paper offerings, and residential FengShui.
