= Qintianjian =

Imperial bureau of astronomy, calendar, and divination in China

- Traditional Chinese: 欽天監
- Simplified Chinese: 钦天监
- Literal meaning: Bureau for Revering Heaven
Transcriptions
Standard Mandarin
- Hanyu Pinyin: Qīntiānjiàn

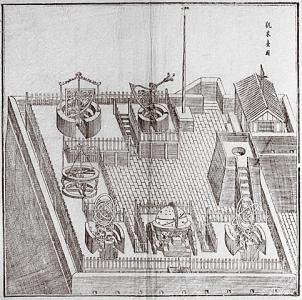
Imperial Observatory in Beijing

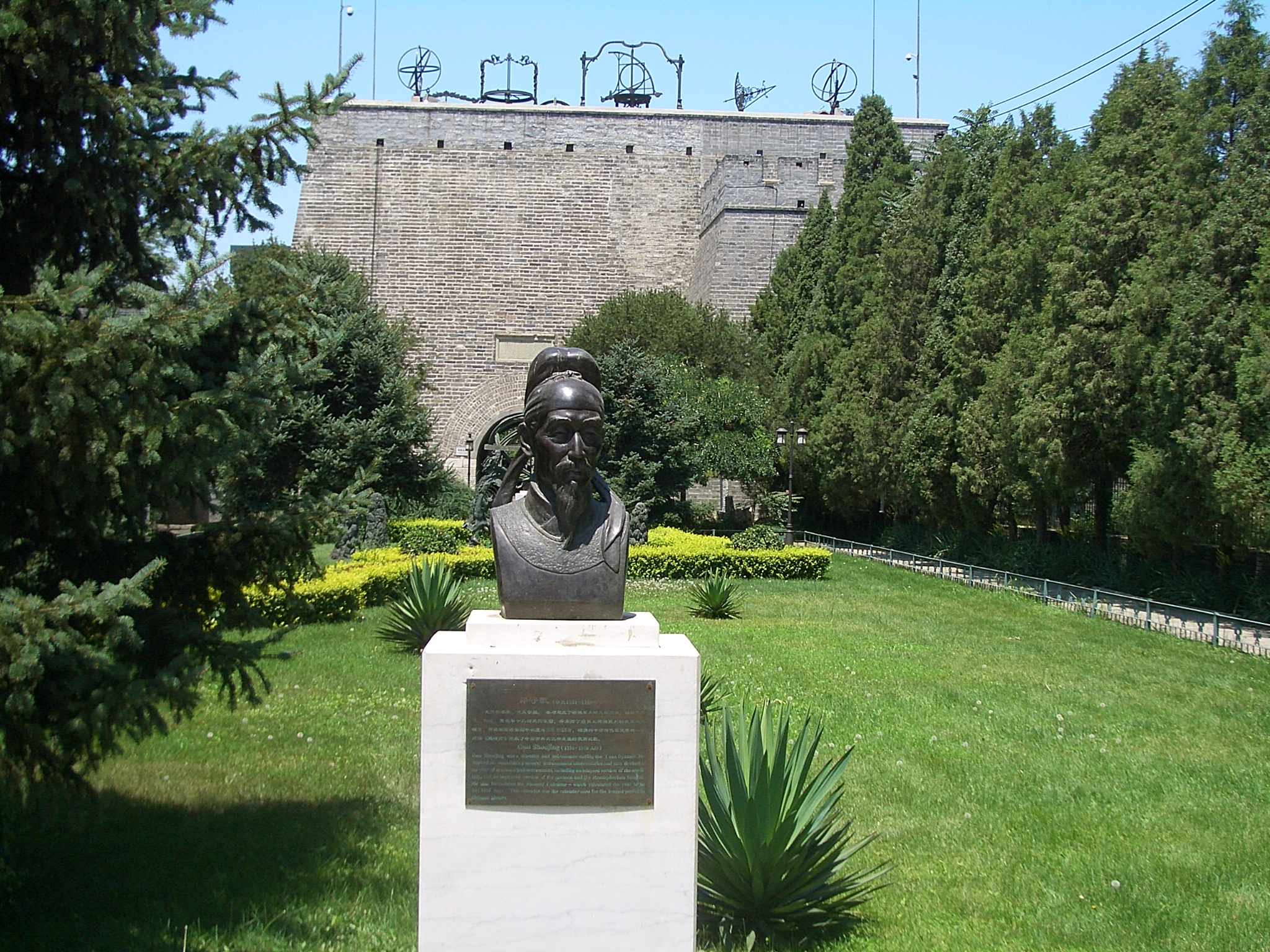
Statue of Guo Shoujing on the observatory grounds, against the background of the observation tower

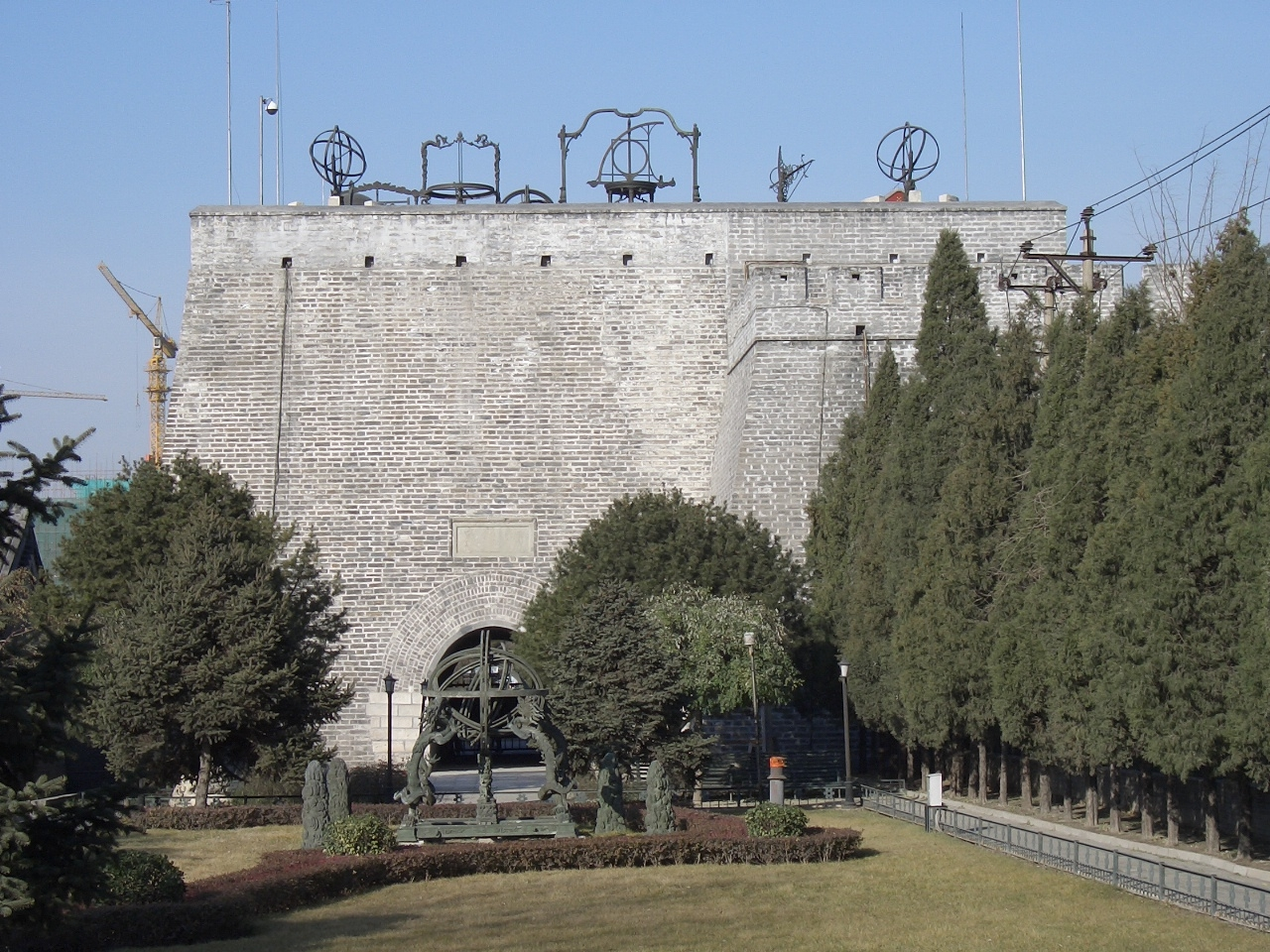
The back of the Beijing Ancient Observatory. Instruments seen from left to right are: the ecliptic armilla, altazimuth, azimuth theodolite, sextant, and equatorial armilla.

The Qintianjian (simplified Chinese: 钦天监; traditional Chinese: 欽天監; pinyin: Qīntiānjiàn; lit. 'Bureau for Revering Heaven'), commonly translated as the Imperial Astronomical Bureau or Directorate of Astronomy, was the official institution of the Chinese imperial state responsible for astronomical observation, calendar production, timekeeping, and the interpretation of celestial and cosmological phenomena on behalf of the emperor. The bureau and its predecessor institutions served these functions across successive Chinese dynasties from antiquity until the fall of the Qing dynasty in 1912.

The Qintianjian occupied a distinctive position within the Chinese bureaucratic system, as its responsibilities encompassed both what would today be classified as astronomical science — systematic observation of celestial bodies, prediction of eclipses, and maintenance of the official calendar — and functions more closely associated with divination and astrology, including the selection of auspicious dates for state activities and the interpretation of unusual celestial events as omens. This dual function reflected the traditional Chinese understanding that celestial and terrestrial phenomena were fundamentally connected, a principle central to the concept of the Mandate of Heaven.

== Historical development ==
=== Early predecessors ===
The institutional management of astronomical observation and calendrical computation by the Chinese state has ancient roots. During the Zhou dynasty (1046–256 BCE), officials responsible for astronomical records and timekeeping were attached to the royal court, reflecting the early association between celestial observation and state governance. The Zhouli (Rites of Zhou), a classical text describing idealised Zhou-era government, specifies officials tasked with observing the stars, maintaining the calendar, and advising the ruler on the significance of celestial phenomena.

During the Han dynasty (206 BCE – 220 CE), the office of Taishiling (太史令, Grand Historian or Grand Astrologer) served as the principal court position responsible for astronomical observation, calendar maintenance, and the recording of celestial omens. The most famous holder of this office was Sima Qian (c. 145–c. 86 BCE), author of the Shiji (Records of the Grand Historian), which includes the Tianguan Shu (天官書, "Treatise on the Celestial Offices"), a systematic account of celestial phenomena and their astrological significance. The Han court's astronomical apparatus represented a significant institutionalisation of celestial observation, including the development of armillary spheres and other observational instruments.

=== Establishment and Tang dynasty ===
The institution underwent various reorganisations and name changes across dynasties. During the Sui dynasty (581–618) and Tang dynasty (618–907), the astronomical bureau was known by several names, including the Taishiju (太史局, Bureau of the Grand Historian) and the Taishijian (太史監, Directorate of the Grand Historian). The Tang bureau was responsible for astronomical observation, the production and revision of the official calendar, the prediction of eclipses, the selection of auspicious dates for court ceremonies and construction, and the interpretation of unusual celestial events such as comets, novae, and meteor showers.

The Tang period also saw significant engagement with foreign astronomical traditions. Indian astronomical and mathematical methods were transmitted to China via Buddhism, and elements of Indian calendrical computation were incorporated into Chinese practice. The bureau's willingness to engage with non-Chinese astronomical knowledge foreshadowed a pattern that would recur dramatically during the late Ming and Qing dynasties with the arrival of European methods.

=== Song and Yuan dynasties ===
During the Song dynasty (960–1279), the astronomical bureau continued to refine its observational and computational capabilities. The Song period saw the development of increasingly precise calendrical systems and the construction of advanced astronomical instruments, including the water-driven astronomical clock tower built by Su Song in 1088, which incorporated an armillary sphere and a celestial globe. The bureau's officials were responsible for multiple calendar reforms during the Song, reflecting the ongoing effort to improve the accuracy of eclipse predictions and seasonal calculations.

Under the Mongol-ruled Yuan dynasty (1271–1368), the bureau was significantly influenced by Islamic astronomical methods introduced by scholars from Central Asia and Persia. The astronomer Jamal ad-Din presented a set of Islamic astronomical instruments and tables to Kublai Khan around 1267, and Islamic astronomical expertise was integrated into the bureau's work. The Yuan court maintained parallel Chinese and Islamic astronomical sections within the bureau. The Shoushi Calendar (授時曆), compiled under the direction of Guo Shoujing in 1281, represented one of the most accurate calendrical systems produced in pre-modern China and was adopted with modifications by the subsequent Ming dynasty.

=== Ming dynasty ===
The name Qintianjian (欽天監) was formally adopted during the Ming dynasty (1368–1644) and became the standard designation for the bureau through the end of the imperial era. The Ming Qintianjian was organised as a mid-ranking bureau within the imperial bureaucracy, headed by a director (監正, jiànzhèng) and staffed by officials trained in astronomy, calendrical computation, and divination.

The bureau's responsibilities during the Ming period included:

- Maintaining astronomical observations and recording celestial phenomena
- Producing and issuing the official annual calendar (曆書, lìshū), which prescribed the agricultural seasons, festivals, and auspicious and inauspicious days for various activities
- Predicting solar and lunar eclipses and reporting them to the emperor
- Selecting auspicious dates and times for state ceremonies, imperial construction projects, military campaigns, and imperial burials
- Interpreting unusual celestial events — comets, supernovae, unusual planetary conjunctions — as omens bearing on the emperor's governance
- Conducting geomantic assessments for the siting and orientation of imperial buildings and tombs

The geomantic function connected the Qintianjian to the practice of feng shui, particularly the Compass school (理氣派) tradition, which relied on calculations involving the Heavenly Stems and Earthly Branches, the Five Phases, and cosmological cycles. The bureau's officials advised on the placement and orientation of major imperial structures, including the Forbidden City and the Ming tombs, applying principles that integrated astronomical observation with geomantic analysis.

By the late Ming period, the bureau's calendrical predictions had accumulated significant errors, particularly in the prediction of eclipses. This crisis of accuracy created the conditions for the dramatic intervention of European astronomy in the early 17th century.

=== Qing dynasty and Jesuit influence ===
The Qing dynasty (1644–1912) Qintianjian is perhaps best known for the prominent role played by Jesuit missionaries within the bureau, a development that represented one of the most consequential encounters between Chinese and European science in the pre-modern period.

The German Jesuit Johann Adam Schall von Bell (1592–1666) had begun reforming the Chinese calendar during the late Ming at the invitation of the court, drawing on European astronomical methods including the heliocentric observations compiled by Tycho Brahe and Johannes Kepler. Following the Manchu conquest and the establishment of the Qing dynasty, Schall von Bell was appointed director of the Qintianjian in 1644 — an extraordinary appointment that placed a European priest at the head of one of the oldest scientific institutions in the Chinese state.

Schall von Bell was succeeded by the Belgian Jesuit Ferdinand Verbiest (1623–1688), who served as director from 1669 and oversaw the construction of new astronomical instruments for the Beijing Ancient Observatory, several of which survive to the present day. Verbiest's tenure solidified the integration of European observational techniques into the bureau's work, though the underlying cosmological framework — including the astrological and divinatory functions of the bureau — remained rooted in Chinese tradition.

The role of Jesuits in the Qintianjian was not without controversy. In 1664–1665, during the Kangxi Emperor's minority, a political faction led by the Chinese Muslim astronomer Yang Guangxian (楊光先) challenged Schall von Bell's position and the accuracy of the Jesuit-reformed calendar in what became known as the Calendar Case (曆獄, lìyù). Schall von Bell was imprisoned and sentenced to death (later commuted due to his age and illness), and the Jesuits were temporarily removed from the bureau. The Kangxi Emperor subsequently reinstated the Jesuit methods after a public test demonstrated their superior accuracy in predicting a solar eclipse.

The Kangxi Emperor (r. 1661–1722) took a personal interest in the work of the Qintianjian and in Western scientific methods more broadly. He received instruction in mathematics, astronomy, and geography from Jesuit scholars and sponsored the compilation of mathematical and astronomical compendia that incorporated both Chinese and European methods.

European Jesuits continued to serve in the Qintianjian through the 18th century, though the suppression of the Society of Jesus in 1773 and the gradual decline of the Jesuit mission in China reduced their influence in the bureau's later years.

=== Dissolution ===
During the suppression of the Boxer Rebellion, some of the instruments were looted by the Eight-Nation Alliance in 1900, but towards the end of World War I they were returned to China by the governments of France and Germany.

The Qintianjian was dissolved following the fall of the Qing dynasty in 1912 and the establishment of the Republic of China. Its astronomical functions were absorbed into modern scientific institutions, while its calendrical, astrological, and geomantic functions — increasingly characterised as superstition (迷信, míxìn) by modernisation reformers — were officially discontinued by the state. The bureau's extensive archives of astronomical records, spanning centuries of systematic observation, have been the subject of study by historians of science, as they contain data on eclipses, supernovae, comets, and other celestial events of value to modern astronomy. In June 1912, it was transferred to the Ministry of Education, reorganized into an observatory, and tasked with compiling the Almanac of the First Year of the Republic of China.

Qintianjian has been preserved in modern-day Beijing and is one of the city's attractions. (See Beijing Ancient Observatory). Currently, the observatory is a museum and part of the Beijing Planetarium.

== Organisation and personnel ==
The Qintianjian's internal organisation varied across dynasties but generally included divisions responsible for:

Astronomical observation — Officials tasked with systematic observation of the sky, recording the positions and movements of celestial bodies, and noting unusual phenomena. Observations were conducted from dedicated platforms, most notably the Beijing Ancient Observatory (established in 1442 and rebuilt with Jesuit-designed instruments in the 1670s).

Calendar production — The annual production of the official calendar was one of the bureau's most important functions. The calendar prescribed not only the dates of months, solar terms, and festivals, but also designated auspicious and inauspicious days for a wide range of activities — a function that connected the bureau's astronomical calculations to its astrological role.

Timekeeping — The bureau maintained the official timekeeping apparatus of the court, including water clocks (漏壺, lòuhú) and later mechanical clocks, and was responsible for announcing the time within the imperial palace.

Divination and date selection — Officials trained in astrological and divinatory methods, including the Four Pillars of Destiny, Qimen Dunjia, and related systems, provided consultations for the court on the timing of ceremonies, construction, military campaigns, and other state activities.

Bureau officials were typically recruited through examination or recommendation and were expected to possess specialised knowledge in astronomy, mathematics, the Yijing (Book of Changes), and calendrical science. The position of bureau director carried moderate bureaucratic rank, and the bureau as a whole occupied a specialised but somewhat peripheral position within the vast apparatus of the Chinese imperial bureaucracy.

== Astronomical and scientific contributions ==
The Qintianjian and its predecessor institutions maintained one of the longest continuous traditions of systematic astronomical observation in world history. Chinese astronomical records preserved through these institutions include:

Eclipse records — Chinese court astronomers maintained detailed records of solar and lunar eclipses spanning over two millennia. These records have been used by modern astronomers to study long-term variations in the Earth's rotation and the secular acceleration of the Moon.

Supernova observations — Chinese astronomical records include observations of several historical supernovae, most notably the "guest star" (客星, kèxīng) of 1054 CE, now identified as the progenitor of the Crab Nebula (SN 1054). This observation, recorded by Song dynasty court astronomers, remains one of the most important historical records in modern astrophysics.

Comet records — Systematic observations of comets, including appearances of Halley's Comet dating back to 240 BCE, were recorded in the bureau's archives and in the astronomical treatises of the official dynastic histories.

Calendar reforms — Successive iterations of the Chinese calendar, developed and implemented by the bureau, reflect increasingly sophisticated mathematical and astronomical methods, culminating in the Yuan dynasty Shoushi Calendar of 1281 and the Qing dynasty Jesuit-reformed calendar.

== Relationship to feng shui and divination ==
The Qintianjian's role extended beyond astronomy and calendrical science into the domains of feng shui, astrology, and divination. This combination of functions reflected the Chinese cosmological tradition in which celestial observation, temporal calculation, and the interpretation of omens were understood as interconnected aspects of a single system of correspondences between heaven and earth.

Bureau officials conducted geomantic assessments for imperial building and burial projects, applying feng shui principles to determine optimal locations, orientations, and configurations. The Forbidden City, the Ming tombs, the Eastern Qing tombs, and the Summer Palace were among the major imperial projects for which the Qintianjian provided geomantic consultation.

The bureau also maintained and controlled access to certain divinatory texts and methods. The Qimen Dunjia system, a complex method integrating cosmological, temporal, and spatial variables for strategic and divinatory analysis, was among the methods associated with the bureau, and certain texts relating to it were reportedly classified during portions of the Ming and Qing periods.

The imperial court's monopolisation of certain cosmological knowledge through the Qintianjian served a political as well as practical function. Control over the calendar — which determined the agricultural cycle, the timing of rituals, and the designation of auspicious days — was a prerogative of the emperor and a symbol of legitimate rule. The accurate prediction of eclipses, in particular, was regarded as evidence that the ruling dynasty maintained the Mandate of Heaven, while failures of prediction could be interpreted as signs of dynastic decline.

== Legacy ==
The Qintianjian's archives and observational records constitute one of the most significant bodies of pre-modern astronomical data in the world. Historians of science, including Joseph Needham in his monumental Science and Civilisation in China series, have drawn extensively on these records to document the development of Chinese astronomy and its contributions to global scientific knowledge.

The Beijing Ancient Observatory, which served as the Qintianjian's primary observational facility during the Ming and Qing dynasties, survives as a museum and heritage site in central Beijing. It houses a collection of astronomical instruments from both the pre-Jesuit and Jesuit periods, including the bronze instruments designed by Ferdinand Verbiest in the 1670s.

The bureau's dual role as both a scientific institution and a centre of astrological and geomantic practice has made it a subject of interest for scholars studying the relationship between science, religion, and the state in Chinese history. Ole Bruun has argued that the Qintianjian's management of both astronomical and geomantic knowledge illustrates the broader pattern by which the Chinese imperial court sought to maintain ideological control over cosmological knowledge.

== See also ==
- Sexagenary cycle

== Sources ==
- Bruun, Ole (2003). Fengshui in China: Geomantic Divination Between State Orthodoxy and Popular Religion. University of Hawaiʻi Press. ISBN 0-8248-2757-0.
- Elman, Benjamin A. (2005). On Their Own Terms: Science in China, 1550–1900. Harvard University Press. ISBN 978-0-674-01685-9.
- Ho, Peng Yoke (2003). Chinese Mathematical Astrology: Reaching Out to the Stars. Routledge. ISBN 978-0-415-86310-0.
- Needham, Joseph; Wang, Ling (1995) [1959]. Science and Civilisation in China: Volume 3, Mathematics and the Sciences of the Heavens and the Earth. Cambridge, England: Cambridge University Press. ISBN 978-0-521-05801-8.
- Sivin, Nathan (2009). Granting the Seasons: The Chinese Astronomical Reform of 1280. Springer. ISBN 978-0-387-78955-2.
