= Nine Star Ki =

Chinese system of astrology

Nine Star Ki (traditional Chinese: 九星命理 ; simplified Chinese: 九宫命理 Japanese: 九星気学) is a popular system of astrology, often used alongside Feng shui. It is an adjustment or consolidation, made in 1924 by Shinjiro Sonoda (1876–1961), to traditional Chinese divination and geomancy methods, such as Flying Star Feng Shui, the Ming Gua (命卦) number from the Eight Mansions Compass School of Feng Shui, and combining the Lo Shu Square with the "Later Heaven" Bagua.

== The stars ==
There are thought to be nine-year and nine-month cycles of Ki/Qi on Earth, which are related to solar and seasonal cycles, and which have common effects across the planet on people's mental and physical development and experiences throughout their lives. The Nine Star Ki 'stars' are numbers that represent those cycles. The numbers can be calculated for anyone on/from Earth using only a birthdate. The system most commonly uses two numbers. First, the Honmei star (Japanese: 本命星; translation: "true feelings star", like Honmei choco) is the principal, adulthood, or year number, describing one's most mature mind/heart, karma, or spirit type. Second, the Getsumei star (Japanese: 月命星; translation: "month life star") is the character, childhood, or month number, describing one's physical connection to the Earth, namely one's more primitive or physical features.

A third, 'energetic' number is given by some sources and calculators, especially in the Western world, and is said to describe one's outward behavior, personality, or the first impression one usually makes on others. Being derived from the principal and character numbers, the energetic number may not provide new information. It is not a day-specific number, which one can determine by other means. The energetic number also differs from the Ming Gua number used by the Chinese Eight Mansions Compass School of Feng Shui.

== Star characteristics and compatibilities ==
The numbers are each associated with one of the Chinese Five Elements, following the "Later Heaven" Bagua pattern. Each number/star is considered a variation on the characteristics of that Element group. For example, 3 is the blue-green Wood star, whereas 4 is the dark-green Wood star. Combining the Lo Shu Square with the "Later Heaven" Bagua, blue-green is meant to indicate being more excited, aroused, and early Spring-like, whereas dark-green means being more gentle, flexible, and later Spring-like. Here are the group assignments: 1 stands alone as Water; 2, 5, and 8 are the Earth group; 3 and 4 are the Wood group; 6 and 7 are the Metal group; and 9 stands alone as Fire.

Compatibilities between the stars and groups generally follow the Five Element cycles of supporting vs. controlling. For example, a person with a principal number of the Fire type/group might feel mentally energized or nurtured by someone whose principal number is in the Wood group.

Lengthy interpretations of the characteristics and compatibilities of the stars and groups are a hallmark of many Nine Star Ki books and articles (e.g.,).

== Star calculations ==
At least two online calculators find all three principal, character, and energetic numbers for a given birthdate for free. Several online calculators provide only the principal and character numbers. Some calculators present Nine Star Ki numbers alongside other numbers used for Feng Shui, such as the Ming Gua number.

The numbers can be manually determined using tables and/or equations. The energetic number is determined by superimposing the Lo Shu Square on a fixed pattern of annual permutations of that square, called the tables of the Movements of Ki/Qi. Those permutations consistently result in a table of 81 possible number combinations.

Nine Star Ki uses the Chinese solar calendar, with the beginning of a year falling at the midpoint between the winter solstice and the following spring equinox, which is in early February on the Gregorian calendar. Therefore, the Chinese and Gregorian years and months do not exactly overlap. People with birthdays in January, or early in a Gregorian month, can have the principal or character number(s) of the previous Chinese solar year or month.

== Stars of famous people ==
A database of famous people's Nine Star Ki types exists in Japanese.
