= Liao-Fan's Four Lessons =

Book by Yuan Liaofan

Liao-Fan's Four Lessons (Chinese: 了凡四訓) is a book written by Yuan Liaofan (Chinese: 袁了凡; 1533–1606), was a Chinese official during the Ming Dynasty, born in present-day Wujiang County, Jiangsu Province. Yuan wrote the book to teach his son, Yuan Tian-Chi. The principal idea behind these lessons is that destiny can be changed through proper cultivation of kindness and humility. Thus, one should not be bound by fate, but by one's own actions.

Yuan Liaofan was told by a Kong a Taoist monk, that he would only live to the age of 53 and would have no son. At first, he disregarded this monk's words as farcical nonsense, but as Kong's other predictions began to occur with great accuracy, he then proactively made an effort to rewrite his fate. In relating his own life experiences, Yuan, at the age of 69, through his efforts was able to change his destiny and therefore wrote and taught these four lessons to his son that through fate was never meant to be.

The first lesson shows how to create destiny. The second lesson explains the ways to reform. The third reveals the ways to cultivate kindness and the fourth discloses the benefits of the virtue of humility.

This book is still in circulation today, after more than 400 years, and is studied as a foundational text in learning both Confucianism and Chinese Buddhism.

== Excerpts ==
3 conditions for reform:

1. One must have a sense of shame - conscience.
2. One must be cautious and conscientious of one's own intention and conduct at all time, as well as having a solemn respect of the Divine and the Universal rules/Golden rules.
3. One must have determination and courage to rectify one's mistakes.

3 methods to reform:

1. Changing through action
2. Changing through reasoning
3. Changing from the heart

10 ways to cultivate kindness:

1. Supporting the practice of kindness
2. Harboring love and respect
3. Helping others succeed
4. Persuading others to practice kindness
5. Helping those in desperate need
6. Developing public projects for the greater benefit of the people
7. Giving through donation
8. Protecting the proper teaching
9. Respecting our elders
10. Loving and cherishing all living beings
