= Four Pillars of Destiny =

Chinese astrological and calendrical destiny calculation system

- Traditional Chinese: 四柱命理
- Simplified Chinese: 四柱命理
- Literal meaning: Four pillars destiny principles
Transcriptions
Standard Mandarin
- Hanyu Pinyin: sìzhù mìnglǐ

BaZi
- Traditional Chinese: 八字
- Simplified Chinese: 八字
- Literal meaning: Eight characters
Transcriptions
Standard Mandarin
- Hanyu Pinyin: bāzì

The Four Pillars of Destiny (Chinese: 四柱命理; pinyin: sìzhù mìnglǐ), also known as BaZi (Chinese: 八字; pinyin: bāzì; lit. 'eight characters'), is a Chinese astrological and calendrical system that is historically used to analyse an individual's destiny, fate or life path based on the person's date and time of birth. The system derives its name from its core structure: four "pillars", each consisting of a pair of characters that corresponds to the Sanbao theory incorporating one Heavenly Stem and one Earthly Branch — this theory draws correspondences that align to the year, month, day, and hour of the birth date of a human being. Each pillar contains two Yin and Yang characters when combined together yield eight characters, hence the alternative name BaZi ("eight characters").

The Four Pillars system has been used as one of the principal methods within the broader tradition of Chinese destiny calculation (命理學, mìnglǐxué) it is closely related to other Chinese metaphysical systems including feng shui, Qimen Dunjia, Zi Wei Dou Shu, and Chinese astrology. This historical system still remains widely practised in contemporary settings in mainland China, Taiwan, Hong Kong, Singapore, Malaysia, and among Chinese diaspora communities. Regional variants are practised in Korea (where it is known as Saju, 사주) and Japan (where it is known as Shichū Suimei, 四柱推命).

== History ==
=== Origins ===
The foundations of the Four Pillars system lie in the correlative theories on cosmology that developed during the Han dynasty (206 BCE – 220 CE), this philosophy systematically mapped correspondences between celestial phenomena, temporal cycles, and human affairs using the Heavenly Stems and Earthly Branches, yin and yang theory, and the Five Phases (五行, wǔxíng) theory. The use of stem-branch pairs to record dates — a practice central to the Four Pillars method — dates to at least the Shang dynasty (c. 1600–1046 BCE), as evidenced by oracle bone inscriptions that record the sexagenary (sixty-day) cycle.

The formal systematisation of the Four Pillars as a method of destiny calculation is traditionally attributed to the Tang dynasty (618–907) scholar Li Xuzhong (李虛中, c. 761–813), who is credited with developing a method of analysing a person's fate based on the stem-branch pairs of the year, month, and day of birth — that is, three pillars and six characters. The expansion to four pillars and eight characters, incorporating the hour of birth, is attributed to the Song dynasty (960–1279) scholar Xu Ziping (徐子平), whose work became so influential that the Four Pillars method is sometimes called the Ziping method (子平法, Zǐpíng fǎ) in his honour.

=== Development and textual tradition ===
The Song dynasty represented the formative period for Four Pillars practice as the classical text Yuanhai Ziping (淵海子平, The Deep Sea of Ziping), this influential text was compiled during the Song and later revised during the Ming dynasty, later becoming one of the foundational manuals still used until the present day. Subsequent important texts include the Sanming Tonghui (三命通會, Comprehensive Guide to the Three Fates), attributed to the Ming scholar Wan Minying (萬民英), and the Diqian Suiji (滴天髓, Dripping Sky Marrow), a text of disputed authorship that is regarded as one of the most sophisticated treatises on Four Pillars theory.

During the Ming and Qing dynasties, Four Pillars calculation was among the methods used by officials of the Qintianjian (欽天監, Imperial Astronomical Bureau) for court divination, including the selection of auspicious dates for state ceremonies and the assessment of compatibility for imperial marriages. While Four Pillars practice was not exclusively an imperial method — it was widely used by professional fortune-tellers (命理師, mìnglǐshī) throughout Chinese society — the court's use of it lent the system prestige and institutional support.

=== Modern period ===
During the 20th century, Four Pillars practice, along with other forms of traditional Chinese divination, was discouraged under modernisation campaigns in mainland China, particularly during the New Culture Movement and later under the People's Republic of China, which classified such practices as superstition (迷信, míxìn). The practice nonetheless survived and experienced a significant revival from the late 20th century onward, particularly in Taiwan, Hong Kong, Singapore, and Malaysia. In mainland China, a gradual relaxation of restrictions since the 1980s has allowed Four Pillars consultation to resume openly, often marketed alongside feng shui services.

== Structure ==
=== The four pillars ===
The system's core structure consists of four pairs of characters, each pair composed of one of the ten Heavenly Stems (天干, tiāngān) and one of the twelve Earthly Branches (地支, dìzhī). These four pairs correspond to:

Pillar	Chinese	Represents	Determines
Year Pillar (年柱)	年柱 niánzhù	Year of birth	Ancestry, early life, social context
Month Pillar (月柱)	月柱 yuèzhù	Month of birth	Parents, upbringing, career foundation
Day Pillar (日柱)	日柱 rìzhù	Day of birth	Self, spouse, core identity
Hour Pillar (時柱)	時柱 shízhù	Hour of birth (in two-hour periods)	Children, later life, inner self

Each Heavenly Stem and Earthly Branch carries associations with one of the Five Phases (Wood, Fire, Earth, Metal, Water) and with a yin or yang polarity. The Heavenly Stem of the Day Pillar is considered the most important element, as it represents the person themselves — known as the "Day Master" (日主, rìzhǔ) or "Day Stem" (日干, rìgān) — and serves as the reference point against which all other elements in the chart are interpreted.

=== The sexagenary cycle ===
The pairing of the ten Heavenly Stems with the twelve Earthly Branches produces a repeating cycle of sixty unique combinations, known as the Sexagenary cycle (六十甲子, liùshí jiǎzǐ). This cycle has been used in China to count years, months, days, and hours since antiquity. In the Four Pillars system, each of the four pillars is assigned the stem-branch pair that corresponds to the year, month, day, and hour of the individual's birth according to the Chinese calendar.

The month is determined by the solar terms (二十四節氣, èrshísì jiéqì) rather than the lunar month, making the Four Pillars system a solar-based calculation despite its use of traditional Chinese calendrical elements. The hour of birth is expressed in the traditional Chinese system of twelve double-hours (時辰, shíchén), each corresponding to one Earthly Branch and lasting approximately two hours by modern reckoning.

=== The Five Phases ===
The Five Phases (五行, wǔxíng) — Wood (木), Fire (火), Earth (土), Metal (金), and Water (水) — form the primary analytical framework for interpreting a Four Pillars chart. Each of the ten Heavenly Stems and twelve Earthly Branches is associated with one of the Five Phases and with a yin or yang polarity:

Phase	Yang Stem	Yin Stem	Yang Branch	Yin Branch
Wood (木)	甲 jiǎ	乙 yǐ	寅 yín (Tiger)	卯 mǎo (Rabbit)
Fire (火)	丙 bǐng	丁 dīng	午 wǔ (Horse)	巳 sì (Snake)
Earth (土)	戊 wù	己 jǐ	辰 chén (Dragon), 戌 xū (Dog)	丑 chǒu (Ox), 未 wèi (Goat)
Metal (金)	庚 gēng	辛 xīn	申 shēn (Monkey)	酉 yǒu (Rooster)
Water (水)	壬 rén	癸 guǐ	子 zǐ (Rat)	亥 hài (Pig)

The balance and interaction of the Five Phases within a chart — including the productive cycle (生, shēng: Wood feeds Fire, Fire creates Earth, Earth bears Metal, Metal collects Water, Water nourishes Wood) and the controlling cycle (剋/克, kè: Wood parts Earth, Earth absorbs Water, Water extinguishes Fire, Fire melts Metal, Metal chops Wood) — form the basis for analysis.

=== Ten Gods ===
A key analytical layer in Four Pillars interpretation is the system of "Ten Gods" or "Ten Relationships" (十神, shíshén), which describe the relationship between the Day Master and each of the other elements present in the chart. These relationships are determined by the Five Phase interaction between the Day Master's element and the element of each other stem or branch, combined with the yin/yang polarity of each:

Relationship to Day Master	Chinese	Nature
Rob Wealth (劫財, jiécái)	Same phase, opposite polarity	Competitor, sibling rivalry
Friend (比肩, bǐjiān)	Same phase, same polarity	Peer, companion
Eating God (食神, shíshén)	Produced by Day Master, same polarity	Creativity, expression, appetite
Hurting Officer (傷官, shānggūan)	Produced by Day Master, opposite polarity	Rebelliousness, talent, unconventionality
Indirect Wealth (偏財, piāncái)	Controlled by Day Master, opposite polarity	Windfall, father, speculative gain
Direct Wealth (正財, zhèngcái)	Controlled by Day Master, same polarity	Steady income, wife (in traditional interpretation)
Seven Killings (七殺/偏官, qīshā/piānguān)	Controls Day Master, opposite polarity	Pressure, authority, aggression
Direct Officer (正官, zhèngguān)	Controls Day Master, same polarity	Discipline, status, husband (in traditional interpretation)
Indirect Resource (偏印, piānyìn)	Produces Day Master, opposite polarity	Unconventional knowledge, step-mother
Direct Resource (正印, zhèngyìn)	Produces Day Master, same polarity	Education, mother, support

The distribution and strength of these Ten Gods across the four pillars, combined with their interactions, form the primary basis for a Four Pillars reading.

=== Luck cycles ===
Beyond the static birth chart, Four Pillars analysis incorporates "Major Luck Cycles" (大運, dàyùn), which are ten-year periods that overlay additional stem-branch influences onto the natal chart. The starting point and direction of these cycles are calculated from the month pillar and differ depending on the gender of the individual and the yin/yang polarity of the year stem. Annual influences (流年, liúnián) from the current year's stem-branch pair are also considered. This dynamic layering of temporal cycles onto the birth chart allows practitioners to analyse how an individual's fortune is expected to change over time.

== Interpretation ==
A Four Pillars consultation typically involves the practitioner constructing the eight-character chart from the client's birth data, identifying the Day Master and its strength relative to the other elements, mapping the Ten Gods, and assessing the overall balance of the Five Phases. Key considerations include:

- Whether the Day Master is "strong" (旺, wàng) or "weak" (弱, ruò), determined by the support it receives from other elements in the chart
- Which phases are abundant, deficient, or absent, and what compensating elements might be beneficial
- The configuration of the Ten Gods and what they suggest about the individual's character, relationships, career prospects, and health
- The influence of current and upcoming Luck Cycles on the natal chart

Practitioners may recommend adjustments to one's environment, behaviour, or timing of major decisions based on the analysis. In this respect, Four Pillars practice often intersects with feng shui consultation, as both systems share the Five Phases framework and are frequently offered together by the same practitioners.

== Regional variants ==
=== Saju (Korea) ===
In Korea, the Four Pillars system is known as Saju (사주, 四柱) and has been practised since at least the Goryeo dynasty (918–1392). Saju consultation remains widespread in modern South Korea, where it is commonly sought before major life decisions including marriage, naming children, and career changes. The Korean system follows the same structural principles as the Chinese method but incorporates interpretive traditions that have developed independently within Korean culture.

=== Shichū Suimei (Japan) ===
In Japan, the system is known as Shichū Suimei (四柱推命, lit. "four pillars destiny inference"). It was introduced to Japan through cultural exchanges with China and Korea and has developed its own interpretive conventions and terminology. Shichū Suimei is practised by professional fortune-tellers (占い師, uranaishi) and is one of several Chinese-derived divinatory methods used in Japan alongside Zi Wei Dou Shu and various forms of astrology.

== Relationship to other systems ==
The Four Pillars of Destiny is one of several interrelated systems within Chinese metaphysics. It shares its calendrical and cosmological foundations — the Heavenly Stems, Earthly Branches, Five Phases, and yinyang theory — with feng shui, Qimen Dunjia, Chinese astrology, and Zi Wei Dou Shu.

While the Four Pillars system analyses an individual's destiny through the lens of their birth time, Zi Wei Dou Shu (紫微斗數, "Purple Star Astrology") uses a twelve-palace chart structure that provides a different analytical framework for similar questions. The two systems are sometimes used in conjunction by practitioners. The Four Pillars system's calendrical calculations also feed into Qimen Dunjia and Flying Star Feng Shui, both of which use stem-branch cycles to map temporal influences onto spatial configurations.

== See also ==
- Chinese astrology
- Chinese calendar
- Chinese zodiac
- Earthly Branches
- Feng shui
- Flying Star Feng Shui
- Heavenly Stems
- Heavenly Stems and Earthly Branches
- Luopan
- Qimen Dunjia
- Sexagenary cycle
- Solar term
- Tai Yi Shen Shu
- Five Phases
- Yuan Hai Zi Ping
- Zi Wei Dou Shu

== Sources ==
- Bruun, Ole (2003). Fengshui in China: Geomantic Divination Between State Orthodoxy and Popular Religion. University of Hawaiʻi Press. ISBN 0-8248-2757-0.
- Elman, Benjamin A. (2005). On Their Own Terms: Science in China, 1550–1900. Harvard University Press. ISBN 978-0-674-01685-9.
- Ho, Peng Yoke (2003). Chinese Mathematical Astrology: Reaching Out to the Stars. Routledge. ISBN 978-0-415-86310-0.
- Kalinowski, Marc (2010). "Divination and Astrology: Received Texts and Excavated Manuscripts". In Lagerwey, John; Kalinowski, Marc (eds.). Early Chinese Religion, Part One: Shang through Han (1250 BC–220 AD). Brill. pp. 339–396. ISBN 978-90-04-16835-0.
- Skinner, Stephen (2008). Guide to the Feng Shui Compass: A Compendium of Classical Feng Shui. Golden Hoard Press. ISBN 978-0-9547639-0-9.
- Yoon, Hong-Key (2006). The Culture of Fengshui in Korea: An Exploration of East Asian Geomancy. Lexington Books. ISBN 978-0-7391-1348-6.

== See Also ==
Liao-Fan's Four Lessons

Chinese astrology

Wude Zhongshi Shuo

Ziwu Liuzhu (Chinese medicine)

sexagenary cycle
