= Yuanhai Ziping =

Yuanhai Ziping (simplified Chinese: 渊海子平; traditional Chinese: 淵海子平; pinyin: Yuān Hǎi Zǐ Píng) is the first comprehensive and systematic book on the theory of Four Pillars of Destiny. The book was compiled by Xu Dasheng (徐大升, a.k.a. Xu Ziping zh:徐子平, hence the book's name) of the Song dynasty of China. It is a recording of various Zi Ping's fortune-telling methods. The method involves manipulation of the Four Pillars, each consisting of the two Chinese characters for the date and time of a person's birth (alternative name "eight characters" 八字 Ba Zi).

The names of the book's chapters are:

1. Basics
2. Ten Gods
3. Symbolic stars
4. Six Types of Family Members
5. Fortunes of Females
6. Fortune-telling Verses

== See also ==
- Qimen Dunjia
- Da Liu Ren
- Tai Yi Shen Shu
- Tie Ban Shen Shu
- Feng shui
- Yijing
- Chinese astrology
- Chinese astronomy
- Chinese classics
- Flying Star Feng Shui
