= Zi Wei Dou Shu =

Chinese astrological system using star positions in a twelve-palace chart

- Traditional Chinese: 紫微斗數
- Simplified Chinese: 紫微斗数
- Literal meaning: Purple Star Astrology
Transcriptions
Standard Mandarin
- Hanyu Pinyin: Zǐwēi Dǒushù
Yue: Cantonese
- Jyutping: zi2 mei4 dau2 sou3

Zi Wei Dou Shu (simplified Chinese: 紫微斗数; traditional Chinese: 紫微斗數; pinyin: Zǐwēi Dǒushù; lit. 'Purple Star Astrology'), also romanised as Ziwei Doushu or Purple Star Astrology, is a form of Chinese astrology and fortune-telling that uses a twelve-palace chart populated with over one hundred named stars to analyse an individual's destiny based on their date and time of birth. It is one of the two most widely practised systems of Chinese natal astrology, alongside the Four Pillars of Destiny (八字, BaZi).

The system takes its name from the star Zǐwēi (紫微), which refers to Polaris or the Purple Forbidden enclosure (紫微垣, Zǐwēi Yuán) in Chinese astronomy — the celestial region surrounding the north celestial pole, symbolically associated with the emperor and the centre of the heavens. Dǒushù (斗數) means "star calculation" or "star enumeration", reflecting the system's method of distributing named stars across a chart for interpretive analysis.

Zi Wei Dou Shu is traditionally attributed to the Song dynasty Daoist sage Chen Tuan (陳摶, c. 871–989) and has been practised continuously in China and across East and Southeast Asia for over a thousand years. It is particularly popular in Taiwan, Hong Kong, Singapore, and Malaysia.

== History ==
=== Origins and attribution ===
Zi Wei Dou Shu is traditionally attributed to Chen Tuan (陳摶), a Daoist scholar, hermit, and polymath of the late Five Dynasties and early Song dynasty (960–1279) who spent much of his life in reclusion on Mount Hua (華山) in Shaanxi. Chen Tuan is a semi-legendary figure credited with contributions to several areas of Chinese cosmological thought, including the transmission of the Taijitu (太極圖, "Diagram of the Supreme Ultimate") and developments in Yijing numerology. While the direct attribution of Zi Wei Dou Shu to Chen Tuan cannot be verified historically, it reflects the system's roots in the Song-era synthesis of Daoist cosmology, astronomical observation, and numerological calculation.

The cosmological foundations upon which Zi Wei Dou Shu is built — including the Heavenly Stems and Earthly Branches, the Five Phases, yinyang theory, and the system of celestial divisions centred on the north celestial pole — were established during the Han dynasty (206 BCE – 220 CE) and further developed through subsequent dynasties. The Purple Forbidden Enclosure (紫微垣), the celestial region from which the system takes its name, was one of the Three Enclosures (三垣, sānyuán) used in Chinese star mapping since at least the Han period.

=== Song dynasty development ===
The Song dynasty saw a period of significant systematisation in Chinese astrological and divinatory practice. Zi Wei Dou Shu emerged alongside the maturation of the Four Pillars of Destiny system (refined by Xu Ziping during the same period) and the continued development of Qimen Dunjia and other cosmological calculation methods. The Song era's intellectual climate — characterised by Neo-Confucian cosmological inquiry, Daoist numerical speculation, and the growth of printed book culture — provided a fertile environment for the codification and dissemination of complex astrological systems.

Early Zi Wei Dou Shu texts were transmitted within Daoist circles and among professional fortune-tellers (命理師, mìnglǐshī). The system's emphasis on a large number of named stars, each with specific characteristics and interpretive rules, required substantial study, which contributed to its reputation as a sophisticated and demanding art.

=== Ming, Qing, and modern periods ===
During the Ming dynasty (1368–1644) and Qing dynasty (1644–1912), Zi Wei Dou Shu continued to be practised and refined. Important textual compilations from this period expanded the system's interpretive framework and codified the rules for star placement and palace analysis. Like other astrological and divinatory systems, Zi Wei Dou Shu was among the methods available to the Qintianjian (欽天監, Imperial Astronomical Bureau), though the Four Pillars system and calendrical divination were more prominently associated with court practice.

Following the fall of the Qing dynasty in 1912, Chinese astrological practices including Zi Wei Dou Shu were increasingly characterised as superstition (迷信, míxìn) during successive modernisation campaigns, particularly the New Culture Movement and later political movements under the People's Republic of China. The practice survived principally in Taiwan, Hong Kong, and among Chinese communities in Southeast Asia, where it experienced a revival from the late 20th century onward.

In Taiwan, Zi Wei Dou Shu has become one of the most popular forms of fortune-telling, with numerous schools of interpretation, published manuals, and professional practitioners. The system has also been adapted into software applications and online calculation tools, making it accessible to a broader audience.

== Structure ==
=== The twelve palaces ===
The Zi Wei Dou Shu chart is structured around twelve palaces (十二宮, shí'èr gōng), each representing a specific domain of the individual's life. The palaces are arranged in a fixed grid pattern and are populated with stars based on the individual's birth data. The twelve palaces are:

Palace	Chinese	Life domain
Life Palace	命宮 mìnggōng	Core character, innate potential, life direction
Siblings Palace	兄弟宮 xiōngdì gōng	Siblings, close peers, cooperative relationships
Spouse Palace	夫妻宮 fūqī gōng	Marriage, romantic partnerships, spouse's character
Children Palace	子女宮 zǐnǚ gōng	Children, fertility, relationship with offspring
Wealth Palace	財帛宮 cáibó gōng	Financial capacity, attitude toward money, earning patterns
Health Palace	疾厄宮 jí'è gōng	Physical constitution, health vulnerabilities, illness patterns
Travel Palace	遷移宮 qiānyí gōng	Travel, relocation, external social presentation
Friends Palace	交友宮 jiāoyǒu gōng	Friends, subordinates, social network, staff relations
Career Palace	官祿宮 guānlù gōng	Career, professional achievement, status
Property Palace	田宅宮 tiánzhái gōng	Real estate, home environment, family assets
Fortune Palace	福德宮 fúdé gōng	Mental well-being, spiritual life, inner satisfaction
Parents Palace	父母宮 fùmǔ gōng	Parents, upbringing, inherited conditions

The assignment of which Earthly Branch corresponds to which palace is determined by the individual's birth month and birth hour, making each chart unique to its owner.

=== Star system ===
The defining feature of Zi Wei Dou Shu is its use of a large number of named stars (星曜, xīngyào), each carrying specific characteristics and interpretive significance. These stars are distributed across the twelve palaces based on calculations derived from the individual's birth data. The stars are classified into several tiers:

Major stars (主星, zhǔxīng) — There are fourteen major stars, divided into two groups. The first group of six is led by the Zǐwēi star (紫微星), from which the system takes its name, and the second group of eight is led by the Tiānfǔ star (天府星). Each major star carries a distinct set of personality traits, behavioural tendencies, and life patterns. The placement of the Ziwei star is the anchor point from which the positions of all other stars in its group are derived.

The fourteen major stars are:

Ziwei group (紫微系)		Tianfu group (天府系)	
紫微 Zǐwēi	Emperor Star	天府 Tiānfǔ	Treasury Star
天機 Tiānjī	Heavenly Secret	太陰 Tàiyīn	Moon Star
太陽 Tàiyáng	Sun Star	貪狼 Tānláng	Greedy Wolf
武曲 Wǔqǔ	Military Music	巨門 Jùmén	Giant Gate
天同 Tiāntóng	Heavenly Unity	天相 Tiānxiàng	Heavenly Minister
廉貞 Liánzhēn	Chastity	天梁 Tiānliáng	Heavenly Beam
		七殺 Qīshā	Seven Killings
		破軍 Pòjūn	Army Breaker

Minor stars (輔星, fǔxīng) — A larger set of auxiliary stars that modify and refine the influence of the major stars. These include auspicious stars (吉星, jíxīng) such as Zuǒfǔ (左輔, Left Assistant) and Yòubì (右弼, Right Assistant), and inauspicious stars (煞星, shàxīng) such as Huǒxīng (火星, Fire Star) and Língxīng (鈴星, Bell Star).

Transforming stars (四化星, sìhuà xīng) — Four special modifiers (化祿 Transformation of Wealth, 化權 Transformation of Power, 化科 Transformation of Fame, 化忌 Transformation of Obstruction) that are assigned to specific major stars based on the Heavenly Stem of the individual's birth year. These transformations are considered among the most important interpretive elements in the system.

=== Chart construction ===
Constructing a Zi Wei Dou Shu chart requires the individual's birth year, month, day, and hour according to the Chinese calendar. The calculation proceeds through several steps:

The birth month and birth hour are used to determine the position of the Life Palace (命宮) within the twelve-palace grid. The remaining eleven palaces are then assigned to the remaining positions in fixed sequential order. The birth day and birth month together determine the position of the Ziwei star (紫微), which serves as the anchor from which all other stars in the Ziwei group are placed at fixed intervals. The Tianfu group stars are then placed based on the Ziwei star's position. Minor stars and transforming stars are distributed according to their own placement rules, which reference various combinations of the birth data elements.

The completed chart presents the full distribution of stars across all twelve palaces, which the practitioner then interprets by analysing the major stars present in each palace, the influence of minor and transforming stars, and the interactions between palaces.

== Interpretation ==
=== Reading the chart ===
Interpretation of a Zi Wei Dou Shu chart centres on the analysis of which stars occupy which palaces and how they interact. Key interpretive principles include:

The Life Palace (命宮) is the most important palace, as it represents the individual's fundamental character and life direction. The major star or stars occupying the Life Palace provide the primary characterisation of the individual's innate tendencies.

Each palace is read in the context of its specific life domain. For example, the stars in the Wealth Palace (財帛宮) are interpreted in relation to financial matters, while the same stars in the Career Palace (官祿宮) would be interpreted in relation to professional life. The same star thus carries different practical implications depending on which palace it occupies.

The four Transforming Stars (四化) are given particular weight, as they indicate areas of life where the individual is likely to experience notable fortune, authority, recognition, or difficulty. The palace containing the Transformation of Obstruction (化忌) is typically regarded as an area requiring special attention.

=== Temporal analysis ===
Like the Four Pillars of Destiny, Zi Wei Dou Shu incorporates temporal cycles that overlay the static birth chart with changing influences. The system recognises ten-year Major Cycles (大限, dàxiàn), annual cycles (流年, liúnián), monthly cycles, and daily cycles, each of which shifts the palaces and introduces additional star influences. This allows practitioners to analyse not only the individual's innate character but also the expected trajectory of their life across different periods.

== Comparison with the Four Pillars of Destiny ==
Zi Wei Dou Shu and the Four Pillars of Destiny are the two most prominent systems of Chinese natal astrology and are sometimes used in conjunction by practitioners. While they share common cosmological foundations — both draw on the Heavenly Stems, Earthly Branches, and Five Phases — they differ in their analytical structures:

Feature	Zi Wei Dou Shu	Four Pillars of Destiny
Primary structure	Twelve-palace chart with stars	Four stem-branch pairs (eight characters)
Main analytical units	Named stars with specific characteristics	Five Phases interactions and Ten Gods relationships
Number of variables	Over 100 stars across 12 palaces	8 characters analysed through 5 Phases and 10 Gods
Life domains	Explicitly mapped to 12 dedicated palaces	Inferred from stem-branch relationships
Attribution	Chen Tuan (Song dynasty)	Li Xuzhong (Tang) / Xu Ziping (Song)
Analogy	Often compared to Western natal chart astrology	Often compared to elemental/seasonal analysis

Practitioners note that Zi Wei Dou Shu tends to provide more specific and concrete descriptions of life events and personality traits through its named stars, while the Four Pillars system offers a more abstract analysis of elemental balance and cyclical dynamics. The two systems occasionally yield different emphases when applied to the same individual, and some practitioners recommend consulting both for a more comprehensive analysis.

== Relationship to other Chinese metaphysical systems ==
Zi Wei Dou Shu is part of the broader ecosystem of Chinese metaphysical practices that share common cosmological foundations. Its relationship to other major systems includes:

The Four Pillars of Destiny shares the same birth data inputs and calendrical framework but uses a fundamentally different analytical structure, as described above.

Feng shui, particularly the Compass school and Flying Star Feng Shui, shares the Five Phases framework and the principle of mapping cosmological cycles onto spatial or temporal grids. Where Zi Wei Dou Shu analyses a person's destiny, feng shui analyses the qualities of a physical environment, and the two are sometimes combined in consultation.

Qimen Dunjia similarly uses a grid-based structure (the nine-palace cosmic board) with rotating symbolic elements, but is oriented toward situational and strategic analysis rather than natal destiny reading.

Chinese astronomy, particularly the system of the Three Enclosures and Twenty-eight mansions, provides the celestial framework from which Zi Wei Dou Shu derives its star names and symbolic associations, though the stars in Zi Wei Dou Shu do not correspond directly to observable astronomical objects in most cases.

== Schools and traditions ==
Over the centuries, multiple schools of Zi Wei Dou Shu interpretation have developed, differing in their emphasis on particular stars, methods of temporal analysis, and interpretive conventions. Major divisions include:

The Three-Conjunction School (三合派, sānhé pài), which is the more traditional approach emphasising the analysis of major star combinations and palace interactions. This school focuses on the intrinsic qualities of each star and their relationships when they appear together in the same palace.

The Flying Star School (飛星派, fēixīng pài), which places greater emphasis on the four Transforming Stars (四化) and their movement through the palaces during different temporal cycles. This school is particularly associated with modern Taiwanese practice and is noted for its dynamic analytical approach.

The distinction between these schools is an active area of discussion among practitioners, and many contemporary practitioners draw on elements of both traditions.

== See also ==
- Chinese astrology
- Chinese astronomy
- Chinese calendar
- Chinese zodiac
- Chen Tuan
- Da Liu Ren
- Earthly Branches
- Feng shui
- Flying Star Feng Shui
- Four Pillars of Destiny
- Heavenly Stems
- Heavenly Stems and Earthly Branches
- Luopan
- Purple Forbidden Enclosure
- Qimen Dunjia
- Qintianjian
- Sexagenary cycle
- Three Enclosures
- Twenty-eight mansions
- Five Phases

== Sources ==
- Bruun, Ole (2003). Fengshui in China: Geomantic Divination Between State Orthodoxy and Popular Religion. University of Hawaiʻi Press. ISBN 0-8248-2757-0.
- Elman, Benjamin A. (2005). On Their Own Terms: Science in China, 1550–1900. Harvard University Press. ISBN 978-0-674-01685-9.
- Ho, Peng Yoke (2003). Chinese Mathematical Astrology: Reaching Out to the Stars. Routledge. ISBN 978-0-415-86310-0.
- Kalinowski, Marc (2010). "Divination and Astrology: Received Texts and Excavated Manuscripts". In Lagerwey, John; Kalinowski, Marc (eds.). Early Chinese Religion, Part One: Shang through Han (1250 BC–220 AD). Brill. pp. 339–396. ISBN 978-90-04-16835-0.
- Skinner, Stephen (2008). Guide to the Feng Shui Compass: A Compendium of Classical Feng Shui. Golden Hoard Press. ISBN 978-0-9547639-0-9.
