= Chinese astrology =

Astrology based on Chinese astronomy

Chinese astrology is based on traditional Chinese astronomy and the Chinese calendar. Chinese astrology flourished during the Han dynasty (2nd century BC to 2nd century AD).

Chinese astrology has a close relation with Chinese philosophy (theory of the three harmonies: heaven, earth, and human), and uses the principles of yin and yang, wuxing (five phases), the ten Heavenly Stems, the twelve Earthly Branches, the lunisolar calendar (moon calendar and sun calendar), and the time calculation after year, month, day, and shichen (時辰, double hour). These concepts are not readily found or familiar in Western astrology or culture.

== History and background ==
Chinese astrology was elaborated during the Zhou dynasty (1046–256 BC) and flourished during the Han dynasty (2nd century BC to 2nd century AD). During the Han period, the familiar elements of traditional Chinese culture—the yin-yang philosophy, the theory and technology of the five elements (Wuxing), the concepts of heaven and earth, and Taoist, Buddhist and Confucian morality—were brought together to formalize the philosophical principles of Chinese medicine and divination, astrology and alchemy.

The five classical planets are associated with the wuxing (Note: This order of presentation is known as the "Day of the week" or "Twenty-Eight Mansions" sequence.):

- Mars—Fire (Vermilion Bird) (may be associated with the phoenix which was also an imperial symbol along with the Dragon)
- Mercury—Water (Black Tortoise)
- Jupiter—Wood (Azure Dragon)
- Venus—Metal or Gold (White Tiger)
- Saturn—Earth or Soil (Yellow Dragon)

According to Chinese astrology, a person's fate can be determined by the position of the major planets at the person's birth along with the positions of the Sun, Moon, comets, the person's time of birth, and zodiac sign. The system of the twelve-year cycle of animal signs was built from observations of the orbit of Jupiter (the Year Star; simplified Chinese: 岁星; traditional Chinese: 歳星; pinyin: Suìxīng). Following the orbit of Jupiter around the Sun, Chinese astronomers divided the celestial circle into 12 sections, and rounded it to 12 years (from 11.86). Jupiter is associated with the constellation Sheti (摄提; 攝提- Boötes) and is sometimes called Sheti.

A system of computing one's predestined fate is based on birthday, birth season, and birth hour, known as zi wei dou shu (紫微斗数; 紫微斗數; zǐwēidǒushù), or Purple Star Astrology, is still used regularly in modern-day Chinese astrology to divine one's fortune. The 28 Chinese constellations, Xiu (宿; xiù), are quite different from Western constellations. For example, the Big Bear (Ursa Major) is known as Dou (斗; dǒu); the belt of Orion is known as Shen (参; 參; shēn), or the "Happiness, Fortune, Longevity" trio of demigods. The seven northern constellations are referred to as Xuan Wu (玄武; xuánwǔ). Xuan Wu is also known as the spirit of the northern sky or the spirit of water in Taoist belief.

In addition to astrological readings of the heavenly bodies, the stars in the sky form the basis of many fairy tales. For example, the Summer Triangle is the trio of the cowherd (Altair), the weaving maiden fairy (Vega), and the "tai bai" fairy (Deneb). The two forbidden lovers were separated by the silvery river (the Milky Way). Each year on the seventh day of the seventh month in the Chinese calendar, the birds form a bridge across the Milky Way. The cowherd carries their two sons (the two stars on each side of Altair) across the bridge to reunite with their fairy mother. The tai bai fairy acts as the chaperone of these two immortal lovers.

=== Chinese zodiac ===
Chinese astrology has a close relation with Chinese philosophy. The core values and concepts of Chinese philosophy originate from Taoism.

== Table of the sixty-year calendar ==
The following table shows the 60-year cycle matched up to the Western calendar for the years 1924–2043 (see sexagenary cycle article for years 1924–1983). This is only applied to Chinese Lunar calendar. The sexagenary cycle begins at lichun. Each of the Chinese lunar years are associated with a combination of the ten Heavenly Stems (Chinese: 天干; pinyin: tiāngān) and the twelve Earthly Branches (Chinese: 地支; pinyin: dìzhī) which make up the 60 Stem-Branches (Chinese: 干支; pinyin: gānzhī) in a sexagenary cycle.

	Year	Associated Element	Heavenly Stem	Earthly Branch	Stem-Branch (干支) in Pinyin	Associated Animal	Year
	1924–1983	Associated Element	Heavenly Stem	Earthly Branch	Stem-Branch (干支) in Pinyin	Associated Animal	1984–2043
1	Feb 05 1924–Jan 23 1925	Yang Wood	甲	子	jiǎ-zǐ	Rat	Feb 02 1984–Feb 19 1985
2	Jan 24 1925–Feb 12 1926	Yin Wood	乙	丑	yǐ-chǒu	Ox	Feb 20 1985–Feb 08 1986
3	Feb 13 1926–Feb 01 1927	Yang Fire	丙	寅	bǐng-yín	Tiger	Feb 09 1986–Jan 28 1987
4	Feb 02 1927–Jan 22 1928	Yin Fire	丁	卯	dīng-mǎo	Rabbit	Jan 29 1987–Feb 16 1988
5	Jan 23 1928–Feb 09 1929	Yang Earth	戊	辰	wù-chén	Dragon	Feb 17 1988–Feb 05 1989
6	Feb 10 1929–Jan 29 1930	Yin Earth	己	巳	jǐ-sì	Snake	Feb 06 1989–Jan 26 1990
7	Jan 30 1930–Feb 16 1931	Yang Metal	庚	午	gēng-wǔ	Horse	Jan 27 1990–Feb 14 1991
8	Feb 17 1931–Feb 05 1932	Yin Metal	辛	未	xīn-wèi	Goat	Feb 15 1991–Feb 03 1992
9	Feb 06 1932–Jan 25 1933	Yang Water	壬	申	rén-shēn	Monkey	Feb 04 1992–Jan 22 1993
10	Jan 26 1933–Feb 13 1934	Yin Water	癸	酉	guǐ-yǒu	Rooster	Jan 23 1993– Feb 09 1994
11	Feb 14 1934–Feb 03 1935	Yang Wood	甲	戌	jiǎ-xū	Dog	Feb 10 1994–Jan 30 1995
12	Feb 04 1935–Jan 23 1936	Yin Wood	乙	亥	yǐ-hài	Pig	Jan 31 1995–Feb 18 1996
13	Jan 24 1936–Feb 10 1937	Yang Fire	丙	子	bǐng-zǐ	Rat	Feb 19 1996–Feb 06 1997
14	Feb 11 1937–Jan 30 1938	Yin Fire	丁	丑	dīng-chǒu	Ox	Feb 07 1997–Jan 27 1998
15	Jan 31 1938–Feb 18 1939	Yang Earth	戊	寅	wù-yín	Tiger	Jan 28 1998–Feb 15 1999
16	Feb 19 1939–Feb 07 1940	Yin Earth	己	卯	jǐ-mǎo	Rabbit	Feb 16 1999–Feb 04 2000
17	Feb 08 1940–Jan 26 1941	Yang Metal	庚	辰	gēng-chén	Dragon	Feb 05 2000–Jan 23 2001
18	Jan 27 1941–Feb 14 1942	Yin Metal	辛	巳	xīn-sì	Snake	Jan 24 2001–Feb 11 2002
19	Feb 15 1942–Feb 04 1943	Yang Water	壬	午	rén-wǔ	Horse	Feb 12 2002–Jan 31 2003
20	Feb 05 1943–Jan 24 1944	Yin Water	癸	未	guǐ-wèi	Goat	Feb 01 2003–Jan 21 2004
21	Jan 25 1944–Feb 12 1945	Yang Wood	甲	申	jiǎ-shēn	Monkey	Jan 22 2004–Feb 08 2005
22	Feb 13 1945–Feb 01 1946	Yin Wood	乙	酉	yǐ-yǒu	Rooster	Feb 09 2005–Jan 28 2006
23	Feb 02 1946–Jan 21 1947	Yang Fire	丙	戌	bǐng-xū	Dog	Jan 29 2006–Feb 17 2007
24	Jan 22 1947–Feb 09 1948	Yin Fire	丁	亥	dīng-hài	Pig	Feb 18 2007–Feb 06 2008
25	Feb 10 1948–Jan 28 1949	Yang Earth	戊	子	wù-zǐ	Rat	Feb 07 2008–Jan 25 2009
26	Jan 29 1949–Feb 16 1950	Yin Earth	己	丑	jǐ-chǒu	Ox	Jan 26 2009–Feb 13 2010
27	Feb 17 1950–Feb 05 1951	Yang Metal	庚	寅	gēng-yín	Tiger	Feb 14 2010–Feb 02 2011
28	Feb 06 1951–Jan 26 1952	Yin Metal	辛	卯	xīn-mǎo	Rabbit	Feb 03 2011–Jan 22 2012
29	Jan 27 1952–Feb 13 1953	Yang Water	壬	辰	rén-chén	Dragon	Jan 23 2012–Feb 09 2013
30	Feb 14 1953–Feb 02 1954	Yin Water	癸	巳	guǐ-sì	Snake	Feb 10 2013–Jan 30 2014
31	Feb 03 1954–Jan 23 1955	Yang Wood	甲	午	jiǎ-wǔ	Horse	Jan 31 2014–Feb 18 2015
32	Jan 24 1955–Feb 11 1956	Yin Wood	乙	未	yǐ-wèi	Goat	Feb 19 2015–Feb 07 2016
33	Feb 12 1956–Jan 30 1957	Yang Fire	丙	申	bǐng-shēn	Monkey	Feb 08 2016–Jan 27 2017
34	Jan 31 1957–Feb 17 1958	Yin Fire	丁	酉	dīng-yǒu	Rooster	Jan 28 2017–Feb 15 2018
35	Feb 18 1958–Feb 07 1959	Yang Earth	戊	戌	wù-xū	Dog	Feb 16 2018–Feb 04 2019
36	Feb 08 1959–Jan 27 1960	Yin Earth	己	亥	jǐ-hài	Pig	Feb 05 2019–Jan 24 2020
37	Jan 28 1960–Feb 14 1961	Yang Metal	庚	子	gēng-zǐ	Rat	Jan 25 2020–Feb. 11 2021
38	Feb 15 1961–Feb 04 1962	Yin Metal	辛	丑	xīn-chǒu	Ox	Feb 12 2021–Jan 31 2022
39	Feb 05 1962–Jan 24 1963	Yang Water	壬	寅	rén-yín	Tiger	Feb 01 2022–Jan 21 2023
40	Jan 25 1963–Feb 12 1964	Yin Water	癸	卯	guǐ-mǎo	Rabbit	Jan 22 2023–Feb 09 2024
41	Feb 13 1964–Feb 01 1965	Yang Wood	甲	辰	jiǎ-chén	Dragon	Feb 10 2024–Jan 28 2025
42	Feb 02 1965–Jan 20 1966	Yin Wood	乙	巳	yǐ-sì	Snake	Jan 29 2025–Feb 16 2026
43	Jan 21 1966–Feb 08 1967	Yang Fire	丙	午	bǐng-wǔ	Horse	Feb 17 2026–Feb 05 2027
44	Feb 09 1967–Jan 29 1968	Yin Fire	丁	未	dīng-wèi	Goat	Feb 06 2027–Jan 25 2028
45	Jan 30 1968–Feb 16 1969	Yang Earth	戊	申	wù-shēn	Monkey	Jan 26 2028–Feb 12 2029
46	Feb 17 1969–Feb 05 1970	Yin Earth	己	酉	jǐ-yǒu	Rooster	Feb 13 2029–Feb 02 2030
47	Feb 06 1970–Jan 26 1971	Yang Metal	庚	戌	gēng-xū	Dog	Feb 03 2030–Jan 22 2031
48	Jan 27 1971–Feb 14 1972	Yin Metal	辛	亥	xīn-hài	Pig	Jan 23 2031–Feb 10 2032
49	Feb 15 1972–Feb 02 1973	Yang Water	壬	子	rén-zǐ	Rat	Feb 11 2032–Jan 30 2033
50	Feb 03 1973–Jan 22 1974	Yin Water	癸	丑	guǐ-chǒu	Ox	Jan 31 2033–Feb 18 2034
51	Jan 23 1974–Feb 10 1975	Yang Wood	甲	寅	jiǎ-yín	Tiger	Feb 19 2034–Feb 07 2035
52	Feb 11 1975–Jan 30 1976	Yin Wood	乙	卯	yǐ-mǎo	Rabbit	Feb 08 2035–Jan 27 2036
53	Jan 31 1976–Feb 17 1977	Yang Fire	丙	辰	bǐng-chén	Dragon	Jan 28 2036–Feb 14 2037
54	Feb 18 1977–Feb 06 1978	Yin Fire	丁	巳	dīng-sì	Snake	Feb 15 2037–Feb 03 2038
55	Feb 07 1978–Jan 27 1979	Yang Earth	戊	午	wù-wǔ	Horse	Feb 04 2038–Jan 23 2039
56	Jan 28 1979–Feb 15 1980	Yin Earth	己	未	jǐ-wèi	Goat	Jan 24 2039–Feb 11 2040
57	Feb 16 1980–Feb 04 1981	Yang Metal	庚	申	gēng-shēn	Monkey	Feb 12 2040–Jan 31 2041
58	Feb 05 1981–Jan 24 1982	Yin Metal	辛	酉	xīn-yǒu	Rooster	Feb 01 2041–Jan 21 2042
59	Jan 25 1982–Feb 12 1983	Yang Water	壬	戌	rén-xū	Dog	Jan 22 2042–Feb 09 2043
60	Feb 13 1983–Feb 01 1984	Yin Water	癸	亥	guǐ-hài	Pig	Feb 10 2043–Jan 29 2044

== Wuxing ==
Although it is usually translated as 'element', the Chinese word xing literally means something like 'changing states of being', 'permutations' or 'metamorphoses of being'. In fact, Sinologists cannot agree on one single translation. The Chinese notion of 'element' is therefore quite different from the Western one. In the west, India Vedic, and Japanese Go dai elements were seen as the basic building blocks of matter and static or stationary. The Chinese 'elements', by contrast, were seen as ever changing, and the transliteration of xing is simply 'the five changes' and in traditional Chinese medicine are commonly referred to as phrases. Things seen as associated to each xing are listed below.

=== Fire (火) ===
- The South (南)
- Summer (夏)
- Vermilion Bird/Vermilion Phoenix (朱雀)
- Red Dragon (赤龍)
- Chidi (赤帝)/Shennong (神农)
- The Planet Mars (火星)
- The Color Red (赤)
- Circulatory system, Heart (心) and Small intestine (小肠)

=== Water (水) ===
- The North (北)
- Winter (冬)
- Black Tortoise (玄武)
- Black Dragon (黑龍/玄龍)
- Xuandi (玄帝)/Zhuanxu (颛顼)
- The Planet Mercury (水星)
- The Color Black/Blue (黑)
- Skeleton system (骨), Urinary bladder and Kidney (肾)

=== Wood (木) ===
- The East (東)
- Springtime (春)
- Azure Dragon (青龍)
- Cangdi (蒼帝)/Taihao (太昊)
- The Planet Jupiter (木星)
- The Color Green (緑)
- Hepatic system, Liver (肝) and Gall bladder (胆)

=== Metal (金) ===
- The West (西)
- Autumn (秋)
- White Tiger (白虎)
- White Dragon (白龍)
- White Emperor (白帝)/Shaohao (少昊)
- The Planet Venus (金星)
- The Color White (白)
- Respiratory system, Lung (肺) and Large intestine (大肠)

=== Earth (土) ===
- Center (中)
- Change of seasons (the last month of the season)
- The Yellow Dragon (黄龙/黃龍)
- Yellow Emperor (黄帝)/Xuanyuan (轩辕)
- The Planet Saturn (土星)
- The Color Yellow (黄)
- Digestive system, Spleen (脾) and Stomach (胃)

=== Wuxing generative cycle (生 sheng) ===
(Generative, Inter-promoting, begetting, engendering, mothering or enhancing cycle): Wood fuels Fire to burn; Fire creates Earth (ash); Earth produces minerals and structure represented by the Metal element; Metal creates Water from condensation and provides nutrients; Water nourishes Wood to grow.

=== Wuxing destructive cycle (克 kè) ===
The destructive cycle is important to create restraints in the whole system. For example, if Fire was allowed to burn out of control, it would be devastating and destructive as we see in nature in the form of bush fires or internally as high fevers, (Destructive, overcoming or inter-restraining or weakening cycle): Wood draws water from the Earth to create stability for building; Earth gives Water direction, like the banks of a river; Water controls Fire by cooling its heat; Fire makes Metal flexible; Metal adds the minerals to Wood for there to be strong upward growth.

== See also ==
- Chinese calendar correspondence table
- Chinese spiritual world concepts
- Chinese fortune telling
- Chinese zodiac
- Da Liu Ren
- Dunhuang Star Chart
- Feng shui
- Four Pillars of Destiny
- Qimen Dunjia
- Qizheng Siyu
- Symbolic stars
- Synoptical astrology
- Tai Sui
- Tai Yi Shen Shu
- Traditional Chinese star names
- Wufang Shangdi
