= Traditional Chinese timekeeping =

Timekeeping before Shixian calendar

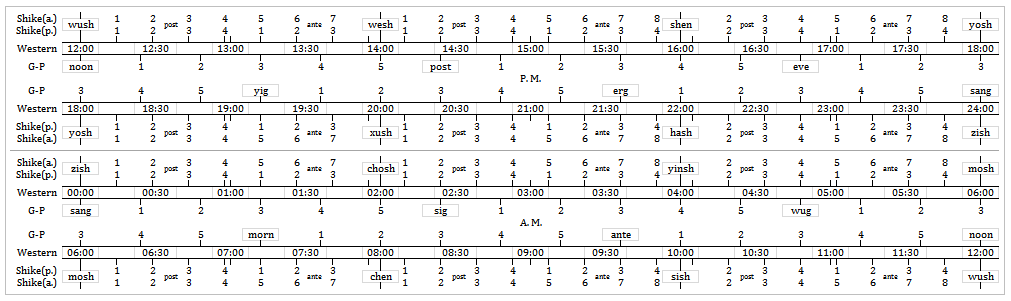
Explanatory chart of Chinese timekeeping

Traditional Chinese timekeeping refers to the time standards for divisions of the day used in China until the introduction of the Shixian calendar in 1644 at the beginning of the Qing dynasty.

== Han-era system ==
Dating from the Han dynasty, the third chapter of the Huainanzi outlines 15 hours of daylight. These are dawn (晨明), morning light (朏明), daybreak (旦明), early meal (早食; 蚤食), feast meal (宴食), before noon (隅中), noon (正中), short shadow (少还; 小還), evening (𫗦时; 餔時; 'evening mealtime'), long shadow (大还; 大還), high setting (高舂), lower setting(下舂), sunset (县东; 縣東), twilight (黄昏; 黃昏), rest time (定昏). These correspond to each hour from 06:00 to 20:00 on the 24-hour clock.

== Eastern Han to Ming system ==
The system used between the Eastern Han and Ming dynasties comprised two standards to measure the time in a solar day. Times during daylight were measured in the shí - kè standard, and at night were measured using the gēng - diǎn standard.

Stems and branches in traditional Chinese time
Heavenly stems					Earthly branches				
	Stem		Gēng			Branch		Shí (traditional)	Shí (Song dynasty)
1	jiǎ	甲	19:12	yìgēng	1	zǐ	子	23:00	00:00
2	yǐ	乙	21:36	èrgēng	2	chǒu	丑	01:00	02:00
3	bǐng	丙	00:00	sāngēng	3	yín	寅	03:00	04:00
4	dīng	丁	02:24	sìgēng	4	mǎo	卯	05:00	06:00
5	wù	戊	04:48	wǔgēng	5	chén	辰	07:00	08:00
6	jǐ	己	07:12	morning	6	sì	巳	09:00	10:00
7	gēng	庚	09:36	midmorning	7	wǔ	午	11:00	12:00
8	xīn	辛	12:00	noon	8	wèi	未	13:00	14:00
9	rén	壬	14:24	late afternoon	9	shēn	申	15:00	16:00
10	guǐ	癸	16:48	evening	10	yǒu	酉	17:00	18:00
					11	xū	戌	19:00	20:00
					12	hài	亥	21:00	22:00

=== During daylight: shí-kè ===
The shí - kè (時 – 刻) system is derived from the position of the sun.

==== Dual hour: shí ====
Each shí (時; 时) was 1/12 of the time between one midnight and the next, making it roughly double the modern hour. These dual hours are named after the earthly branches in order, with midnight in the first shí. This first shí traditionally occurred from 23:00 to 01:00 on the 24-hour clock, but was changed during the Song dynasty so that it fell from 00:00 to 02:00, with midnight at the beginning.

Starting from the end of the Tang dynasty into the Song dynasty, each shí was divided in half, with the first half called the initial hour (初) and the second called the central hour (正). The change of the midnight hour in the Song dynasty could thus be stated as going from the central hour of the first shí (子正) to the initial hour of the first shí (子初).

==== One-hundredth of a day: kè ====
Days were also divided into smaller units, called kè (刻). One kè was usually defined as 1/100 of a day until 1628, though there were short periods before then where days had 96, 108 or 120 kè. kè literally means "mark" or "engraving", referring to the marks placed on sundials or water clocks to help keep time.

Using the definition of kè as 1/100 of a day, each kè is equal to 0.24 hours, 14.4 minutes, or 14 minutes 24 seconds. Every shí contains 8 1/3 kè, with 7 or 8 full kè and partial beginning or ending kè. These fractional kè are multiples of 1/6 kè, or 2 minutes 24 seconds. (Note: 600 is the LCM of 100 and 24, so the time between kè and shí scale may be 1/6, 1/3, 1/2, 2/3, or 5/6 major kè. The 1/6 major kè is the common factor) The 7 or 8 full kè within each shí were referred to as "major kè" (大刻). Each 1/6 of a kè was called a "minor kè" (小刻).

==== Describing the time during daylight ====
Both shí and kè were used to describe the time, through one of two ways:

1. Eight kè mode. Before the Tang dynasty, the shí were noted first, then each of the major kè were counted up to 8.
  1. As an example, counting by major kè from the first shí to the second: zǐ (子), zǐ yī kè (子一刻), zǐ èr kè (子二刻), zǐ sān kè (子三刻), zǐ sì kè (子四刻), zǐ wǔ kè (子五刻), zǐ liù kè (子六刻), zǐ qī kè (子七刻), zǐ bā kè (子八刻), chǒu (丑).
  2. The time xū yī kè (戌一刻) would be read as "1 kè after xū shí", making the time 19:14:24.
2. Four kè mode. After the Tang dynasty's division of the shí, it was still noted first, but with an added description of which half of the shí the kè was taking place in. Since this narrowed the range of the possible major kè down to four, it was only necessary to specify the major kè between one and four.
  1. This changes the first example above to: zǐ initial (子初), zǐ initial 1 kè (子初一刻), zǐ initial 2 kè (子初二刻), zǐ initial 3 kè (子初三刻), zǐ initial 4 kè (子初四刻), zǐ central (Note: Note that the beginning of the central hour doesn't occur at the same time as the fourth major kè. The difference between the start of the central hour and the fourth major kè is always between 1 and 5 minor kè.) (子正), zǐ central 1 kè (子正一刻), zǐ central 2 kè (子正二刻), zǐ central 3 kè (子正三刻), zǐ central 4 kè (子正四刻), chǒu initial (丑初).
  2. The time sì central 3 kè (巳正三刻) would be read as "the third kè in the second half of sì", corresponding to the time 11:31:12.

==== Smaller time units ====
===== Fēn =====
kè were subdivided into smaller units, called fēn (分). The number of fēn in each kè varied over the centuries, but a fēn was generally defined as 1/6000 of a day. Using this definition, one fēn is equal to 14.4 seconds. This also means that a fēn is 1/60 of a major kè and 1/10 of a minor kè.

===== Miǎo =====
In 1280, Guo Shoujing's Shòushí Calendar (授时曆) subdivided each fēn into 100 miǎo (秒). Using the definition of fēn as 14.4 seconds, each miǎo was 144 milliseconds long.

===== Shùn and niàn =====
In Buddhism, each fēn was subdivided into shùn (瞬), and shùn were subdivided into niàn (念).

The Mahāsāṃghika, translated into Chinese as the Móhēsēngzhī Lǜ (Taishō Tripiṭaka 1425) describes several units of time, including shùn or shùnqǐng (瞬頃; 'blink moment') and niàn. According to this text, niàn is the smallest unit of time at 18 milliseconds and a shùn is 360 milliseconds. It also describes larger units of time, including a tánzhǐ (彈指) which is 7.2 seconds long, a luóyù (羅豫) which is 2 minutes 24 seconds long, and a xūyú (須臾), which is 1/30 of a day at 48 minutes long. (Note: This 30-part day is identical to the Hindu muhūrta.)

=== During night: gēng-diǎn system ===
The Gēng - diǎn (更 – 點) system uses predetermined signals to define the time during the night.

==== One-tenth of a day: gēng ====
Gēng (更) is a time signal given by drum or gong. The drum was sounded by the drum tower in city centers, and by night watchman hitting a gong in other areas. The character for gēng (更), literally meaning "rotation" or "watch", comes from the rotation of watchmen sounding these signals.

The first gēng theoretically comes at sundown, but was standardized to fall at yǒu shí central 1 kè, or 19:12. The time between each gēng is 1/10 of a day, making a gēng 2.4 hours—or 2 hours 24 minutes—long.

The 5 gēng in the night are numbered from one to five: yì gēng (一更) (alternately chū gēng (初更) for "initial watch"); èr gēng (二更); sān gēng (三更); sì gēng (四更); and wǔ gēng (五更). The 5 gēngs in daytime are named after times of day listed in the Book of Sui, which describes the legendary Yellow Emperor dividing the day and night into ten equal parts. The gēng during daytime are morning (朝); midmorning, (禺); noon, (中); afternoon (晡); and evening (夕).

As a 10-part system, the gēng are strongly associated with the 10 celestial stems, especially since the stems are used to count off the gēng during the night in Chinese literature.

==== One-sixtieth of a day: Diǎn ====
Diǎn (点; 點), or point, marked when the bell time signal was rung. The time signal was released by the drum tower or local temples.

Each diǎn or point is 1/60 of a day, making them 0.4 hours, or 24 minutes, long. Every sixth diǎn falls on the gēng , with the rest evenly dividing every gēng into 6 equal parts.

==== Describing the time during the night ====
Gēng and diǎn were used together to precisely describe the time at night.

Counting from the first gēng to the next would look like this: yìgēng (一更), yìgēng 1 diǎn (一更一点; 一更一點), yìgēng 2 diǎn (一更二点; 一更二點), yìgēng 3 diǎn (一更三点; 一更三點), yìgēng 4 diǎn (一更四点; 一更四點), yìgēng 5 diǎn (一更五点; 一更五點), èrgēng (二更).
Given the time sāngēng 2 diǎn (三更二点; 三更二點), you would read it as "two diǎn after sāngēng", and find the time to be 00:48. (Note: This assumes that the diǎn have not moved; or if they have, that sāngēng still falls at exactly midnight.)

The night length is inconsistent during a year. The nineteenth volume of the Book of Sui says that at the winter solstice, a day was measured to be 60% night, and at the summer solstice, only 40% night. The official start of night thus had a variation from 0 to 1 gēng .

This variation was handled in different ways. From the start of the Western Han dynasty in 206 BC until 102 AD, yìgēng was moved back one kè every 9th day from the winter solstice to the summer solstice, and moved forward one kè every 9th day from summer solstice to the winter solstice. The Xia Calendar (夏历; 夏曆), introduced in 102 AD, added or subtracted a kè to the start of night whenever the sun moved 2.5° north or south from its previous position.

=== Traditional units in context ===
Relationships between traditional Chinese time units
Diǎn	00:00:00; Sāngēng		00:24:00; Sāngēng 1 diǎn		00:48:00; Sāngēng 2 diǎn	01:12:00; Sāngēng 3 diǎn		01:36:00; Sāngēng 4 diǎn		02:00:00; Sāngēng 5 diǎn	02:24:00; Sìgēng		02:48:00; Sìgēng 1 diǎn		03:12:00; Sìgēng 2 diǎn	03:36:00; Sìgēng 3 diǎn		04:00:00; Sìgēng 4 diǎn		04:24:00; Sìgēng 5 diǎn	04:48:00; Wǔgēng		05:12:00; Wǔgēng 1 diǎn		05:36:00; Wǔgēng 2 diǎn	06:00:00; Wǔgēng 3 diǎn		06:24:00; Wǔgēng 4 diǎn		06:48:00; Wǔgēng 5 diǎn	07:12:00; Morning		07:36:00; Morning 1 diǎn		08:00:00; Morning 2 diǎn	08:24:00; Morning 3 diǎn		08:48:00; Morning 4 diǎn		09:12:00; Morning 5 diǎn	09:36:00; Midmorning		10:00:00; Midmorning 1 diǎn		10:24:00; Midmorning 2 diǎn	10:48:00; Midmorning 3 diǎn		11:12:00; Midmorning 4 diǎn		11:36:00; Midmorning 5 diǎn	12:00:00; Noon		12:24:00; Noon 1 diǎn		12:48:00; Noon 2 diǎn	13:12:00; Noon 3 diǎn		13:36:00; Noon 4 diǎn		14:00:00; Noon 5 diǎn	14:24:00; Afternoon		14:48:00; Afternoon 1 diǎn		15:12:00; Afternoon 2 diǎn	15:36:00; Afternoon 3 diǎn		16:00:00; Afternoon 4 diǎn		16:24:00; Afternoon 5 diǎn	16:48:00; Evening		17:12:00; Evening 1 diǎn		17:36:00; Evening 2 diǎn	18:00:00; Evening 3 diǎn		18:24:00; Evening 4 diǎn		18:48:00; Evening 5 diǎn	19:12:00; Yìgēng		19:36:00; Yìgēng 1 diǎn		20:00:00; Yìgēng 2 diǎn	20:24:00; Yìgēng 3 diǎn		20:48:00; Yìgēng 4 diǎn		21:12:00; Yìgēng 5 diǎn	21:36:00; Èrgēng		22:00:00; Èrgēng 1 diǎn		22:24:00; Èrgēng 2 diǎn	22:48:00; Èrgēng 3 diǎn		23:12:00; Èrgēng 4 diǎn		23:36:00; Èrgēng 5 diǎn
Gēng	00:00:00; Sāngēng										02:24:00; Sìgēng										04:48:00; Wǔgēng										07:12:00; Morning										09:36:00; Midmorning										12:00:00; Noon										14:24:00; Afternoon										16:48:00; Evening										19:12:00; Yìgēng										21:36:00; Èrgēng									
Kè (only major kè)	00:00:00	00:14:24	00:28:48	00:43:12	00:57:36	01:12:00	01:26:24	01:40:48	01:55:12	02:09:36	02:24:00	02:38:24	02:52:48	03:07:12	03:21:36	03:36:00	03:50:24	04:04:48	04:19:12	04:33:36	04:48:00	05:02:24	05:16:48	05:31:12	05:45:36	06:00:00	06:14:24	06:28:48	06:43:12	06:57:36	07:12:00	07:26:24	07:40:48	07:55:12	08:09:36	08:24:00	08:38:24	08:52:48	09:07:12	09:21:36	09:36:00	09:50:24	10:04:48	10:19:12	10:33:36	10:48:00	11:02:24	11:16:48	11:31:12	11:45:36	12:00:00	12:14:24	12:28:48	12:43:12	12:57:36	13:12:00	13:26:24	13:40:48	13:55:12	14:09:36	14:24:00	14:38:24	14:52:48	15:07:12	15:21:36	15:36:00	15:50:24	16:04:48	16:19:12	16:33:36	16:48:00	17:02:24	17:16:48	17:31:12	17:45:36	18:00:00	18:14:24	18:28:48	18:43:12	18:57:36	19:12:00	19:26:24	19:40:48	19:55:12	20:09:36	20:24:00	20:38:24	20:52:48	21:07:12	21:21:36	21:36:00	21:50:24	22:04:48	22:19:12	22:33:36	22:48:00	23:02:24	23:16:48	23:31:12	23:45:36
Shí (post-Tang)	00:00:00; Zǐ initial					01:00:00; Zǐ central				02:00:00; Chǒu initial				03:00:00; Chǒu central				04:00:00; Yín initial				05:00:00; Yín central				06:00:00; Mǎo initial					07:00:00; Mǎo central				08:00:00; Chén initial				09:00:00; Chén central				10:00:00; Sì initial				11:00:00; Sì central				12:00:00; Wǔ initial					13:00:00; Wǔ central				14:00:00; Wèi initial				15:00:00; Wèi central				16:00:00; Shēn initial				17:00:00; Shēn central				18:00:00; Yǒu initial					19:00:00; Yǒu central				20:00:00; Xū initial				21:00:00; Xū central				22:00:00; Hài initial				23:00:00; Hài central			
Shí (ancient)	00:00:00; Zǐshí					01:00:00; Chǒushí								03:00:00; Yínshí								05:00:00; Mǎoshí									07:00:00; Chénshí								09:00:00; Sìshì								11:00:00; Wǔshí									13:00:00; Wèishí								15:00:00; Shēnshí								17:00:00; Yǒushí									19:00:00; Xūshí								21:00:00; Hàishí								23:00:00; Zǐshí			

== Modern applications ==
Chinese still uses characters from these systems to describe time, even though China has changed to the UTC standards of hours, minutes, and seconds.

shí is still used to describe the hour. Because of the potential for confusion, xiǎoshí (小时; 小時; 'small hour') is sometimes used for the hour as part of a 24-hour cycle, and shíchen (时辰; 時辰) is used for the hour as part of the old 12-hour cycle. Diǎn is also used interchangeably with shí for the hour. It can also be used to talk about the time on the hour—for example, 8 o' clock is written as 8 diǎn (八点; 八點).

Fēn is now the standard term for the minute. Sometimes the word fēnzhōng (分钟; 分鐘; 'clock minute') is used to clarify that one is talking about modern minutes. The time 09:45 can thus be written as "9 shí, 45 fēn" (九时四十五分; 九時四十五分) or "9 diǎn, 45 fēn" (九点四十五分; 九點四十五分).

kè has been defined as 1/96 of a day since 1628, so the modern kè equals 15 minutes and each double hour contains exactly 8 kè. Since then, kè has been used as shorthand to talk about time in 1/8 of a double hour or 1/4 of a single hour. Their usage is similar to using "quarter hour" for 15 minutes or "half an hour" for 30 minutes in English. For example, 6:45 can be written as "6 diǎn, 3 kè" (六点三刻; 六點三刻).

Miǎo is now the standard term for a second. Like fēn, it is sometimes written as miǎozhōng (秒钟; 秒鐘; 'clock second') to clarify that someone is talking about modern seconds.

== See also ==
- Chinese Buddhism, the texts from which the smallest units of traditional Chinese time are derived
- Chinese calendar
- Chinese units of measurement
- Date and time notation in Asia
- Decimal time
- Hour

== Bibliography ==
- Ronan, Colin (1999). "Astronomy in China, Korea and Japan". In Christopher Walker (ed.). Astronomy before the telescope. London: British Museum Press. pp. 247–250. ISBN 0-7141-2733-7.
- Stephenson, F. Richard (1997). Historical Eclipses and Earth's Rotation. Cambridge: Cambridge University Press. ISBN 9780521461948.
