= Earthly Branches =

System of twelve ordinals native to China

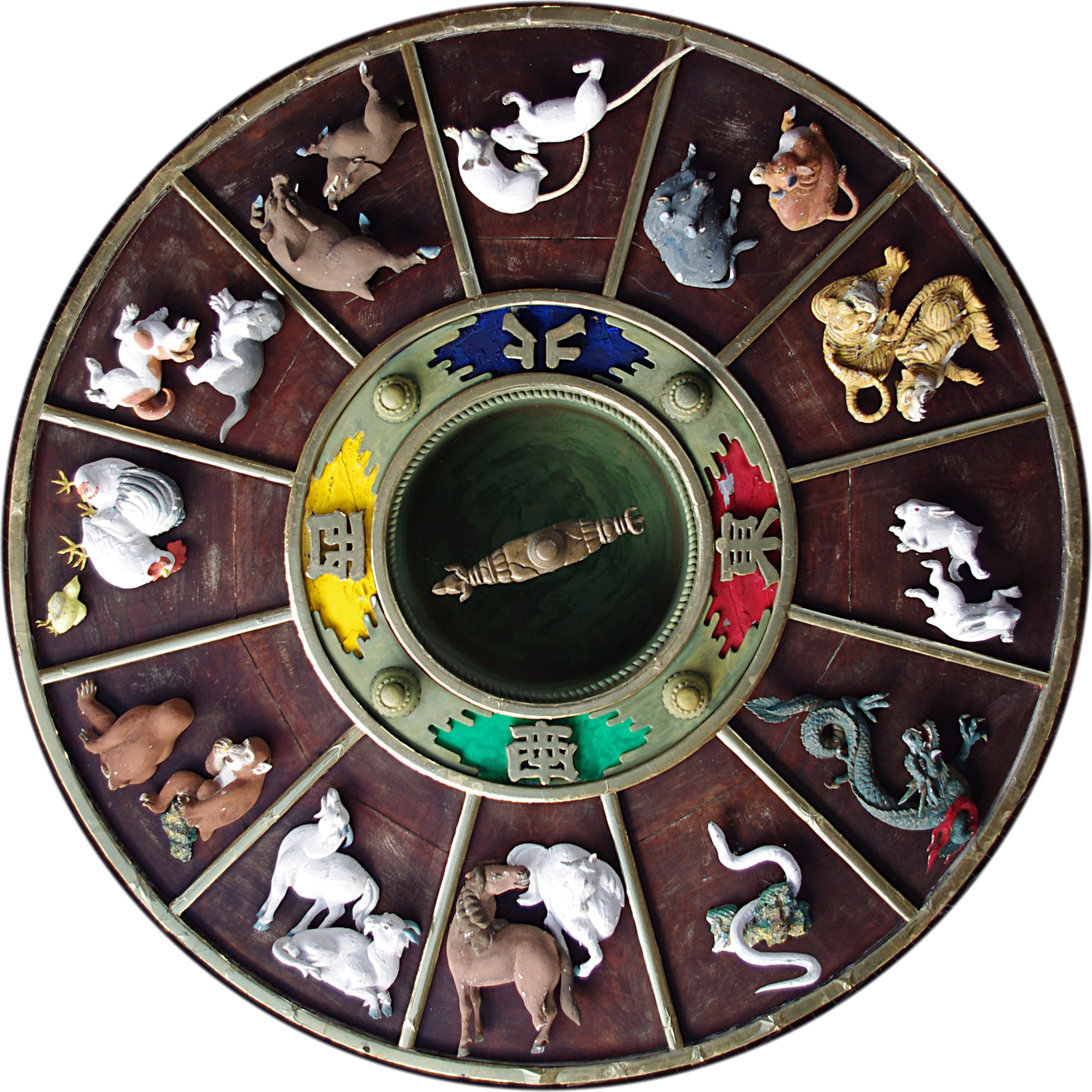
- A carving of the Chinese zodiac on the ceiling of the gate to Kushida Shrine in Fukuoka, Japan

Chinese name
- Chinese: 地支
Transcriptions
Standard Mandarin
- Hanyu Pinyin: dìzhī
Yue: Cantonese
- Yale Romanization: deih ji
- Jyutping: dei6 zi1
Southern Min
- Hokkien POJ: tē-chi; tōe-chi

Vietnamese name
- Vietnamese alphabet: Địa Chi
- Chữ Hán: 地支

Korean name
- Hangul: 지지
- Hanja: 地支
Transcriptions
- Revised Romanization: jiji

Japanese name
- Kanji: 十二支
- Hiragana: じゅうにし
Transcriptions
- Romanization: jūnishi

Manchu name
- Manchu script: ᠵᡠᠸᠠᠨ ᠵᡠᠸᡝ ᡤᠠᡵᡤᠠᠨ
- Möllendorff: juwan juwe gargan

The Earthly Branches (also called the Terrestrial Branches or the 12-cycle) are a system of twelve ordered symbols used throughout East Asia. They are indigenous to China, and are themselves Chinese characters, corresponding to words with no concrete meaning other than the associated branch's ordinal position in the list.

Cultural applications of the Branches include a dating system known as the sexagenary cycle, and their use in Chinese astrology. They are associated with the ten Heavenly Stems in Chinese calendars, and in Taoist practice.

== Overview ==
The twelve Earthly Branches are:

| Earthly Branch | | Pinyin | Zodiac | Elements | Yin-Yang | Hours |
|---|---|---|---|---|---|---|
| 1 | 子 | zǐ | Rat | Water | Yang | 23:00–01:00 |
| 2 | 丑 | chǒu | Ox | Earth | Yin | 01:00–03:00 |
| 3 | 寅 | yín | Tiger | Wood | Yang | 03:00–05:00 |
| 4 | 卯 | mǎo | Rabbit | Wood | Yin | 05:00–07:00 |
| 5 | 辰 | chén | Dragon | Earth | Yang | 07:00–09:00 |
| 6 | 巳 | sì | Snake | Fire | Yin | 09:00–11:00 |
| 7 | 午 | wǔ | Horse | Fire | Yang | 11:00–13:00 |
| 8 | 未 | wèi | Goat | Earth | Yin | 13:00–15:00 |
| 9 | 申 | shēn | Monkey | Metal | Yang | 15:00–17:00 |
| 10 | 酉 | yǒu | Rooster | Metal | Yin | 17:00–19:00 |
| 11 | 戌 | xū | Dog | Earth | Yang | 19:00–21:00 |
| 12 | 亥 | hài | Pig | Water | Yin | 21:00–23:00 |

The branches each have specific names in the languages of the Sinosphere—which include Chinese, Japanese, Korean, Turkic, Vietnamese, and Mongolian. Branches are commonly used when counting in a manner similar to how letters are used according to their alphabetical ordering. In addition to the calendar months, each branch has been associated with several distinct cultural categories, including animals and the hours of the day, with some regional variation.

The Earthly Branches are used with the Heavenly Stems in Chinese calendars, and in Taoist practice. Many Chinese calendrical systems have started the new year on the second new moon after the winter solstice.

== History ==
The earliest attested use of the Earthly Branches and Heavenly Stems is in recording cycles of days. The ten Heavenly Stems provided names for the days of the week during the Shang dynasty (c. 1600 – c. 1050 BC). The Branches are at least as old as the Stems, with archaeological evidence suggesting they may actually be older.

There are several theories about the origin of the Earthly Branches prior to the advent of the historical record. One theory is that the Earthly Branches were adapted from observations of the planet Jupiter (歲星; Suìxīng; 'Year Star'), whose orbital period is roughly twelve Earth years long. Jonathan Smith has proposed that the first meanings of the earthly branches, predating the Shang, were phases of the moon, with the Heavenly Stems at that point referring to divisions of the ecliptic. After being adopted as a calendar these would have lost their clear lunar reference, permitting their re-purposing for Jupiter stations.

In the context of Chinese cosmology becoming increasingly sophisticated during the Warring States period (c. 475 – 221 BC), the 12-, 10-, and 60-cycles began to be applied to units of time other than days.

== Directions ==
The 24 cardinal directions assigned to Earthly Branches and Heavenly Stems, with south (red) placed at the top according to the traditional convention

Though Chinese has words for the four cardinal directions, Chinese sailors and astronomers preferred using the 12 directions of the Earthly Branches, analogous to the use of o'clock for directions by English-speaking pilots. Since twelve points were not enough for sailing, 12 midpoints were added. Instead of combining two adjacent direction names, they assigned new names: for the four diagonal directions, appropriate trigram names of I Ching were used. For the rest, Heavenly Stems 1–4 and 7–10 were used. According to the five elements theory, east is assigned to wood, and the Stems of wood are 甲 (jiǎ) and 乙 (yǐ). Thus, they were assigned clockwise to the two adjacent points of the east.

Mariners like Zheng He (fl. 1405–1433) used 48-point compasses. An additional midpoint was called by a combination of its two closest basic directions, such as 丙午 (bǐngwǔ; 172.5°), the midpoint between 丙 (bǐng; 165°) and 午 (wǔ; 180°).
