= Feng Shui in the Chinese Imperial Court =

Historical use of feng shui by the Chinese imperial court and state apparatus

Feng shui in the Chinese imperial court refers to the practice and institutional management of feng shui (geomancy) by the Chinese emperor, the ruling bureaucracy, and designated state agencies across successive Chinese dynasties. While feng shui has been practised in China for over three thousand years across all levels of society, its application within the imperial court was distinguished by state-level institutional oversight, restricted access to key classical texts, integration with official astronomical and calendrical systems, and large-scale implementation in the planning of imperial cities, dynastic tombs, and palatial complexes.

The management of court feng shui was primarily the responsibility of the Qintianjian (欽天監, Imperial Astronomical Bureau), which employed specialists in kanyu (堪輿, an older term for geomantic practice) alongside astronomers and calendar makers. The institutional practice of feng shui at the court level reflected broader patterns in the relationship between the Chinese state and popular religion, with the court simultaneously employing and seeking to control geomantic knowledge.

== Historical development ==
=== Origins and early dynastic period ===
The origins of feng shui are intertwined with early Chinese cosmological thought and burial practices. Archaeological and textual evidence suggests that concern for the orientation and siting of structures relative to landscape features, water courses, and cardinal directions dates to the Shang dynasty (c. 1600–1046 BCE) and Zhou dynasty (1046–256 BCE). The Zhouli (Rites of Zhou), a classical text traditionally attributed to the early Zhou period, describes officials responsible for assessing the suitability of sites for settlements and buildings, representing an early instance of geomantic expertise embedded within state administration.

During the Han dynasty (206 BCE – 220 CE), the cosmological framework that would underpin later feng shui practice became more systematised, drawing on yinyang theory, the Five Phases (五行, wuxing), and correlative cosmology. The court maintained officials skilled in kanyu and divination, and the siting of imperial tombs was a matter of significant state concern. The scholar Wang Chong (27–c. 100 CE) discussed and critiqued geomantic practices in his Lunheng (Balanced Discourses), providing early evidence of both the prevalence and the contested status of feng shui in elite Chinese culture.

=== Tang and Song dynasties ===
The Tang dynasty (618–907) saw the formal institutionalisation of astronomical and geomantic functions within the imperial bureaucracy. The Taishiju (太史局), a precursor to the later Qintianjian, was responsible for astronomical observation, calendrical compilation, and the assessment of geomantic conditions for state projects. The Tang court employed geomantic specialists for the planning of the capital at Chang'an and for imperial burial sites, including the extensive imperial mausolea in Shaanxi.

During the Song dynasty (960–1279), feng shui practice diversified significantly. Two major schools of practice became more clearly defined: the Form school (形勢派, xingshi pai), which emphasised the visual assessment of landscape forms, and the Compass school (理氣派, liqi pai), which relied on compass-based calculations, cosmological cycles, and numerical analysis using the luopan. The court drew on both traditions but increasingly favoured the systematic, calculation-intensive methods of the Compass school for major state projects. The Song period also saw the proliferation of feng shui texts, some of which were compiled or sponsored by court scholars.

=== Yuan dynasty ===
The Mongol-ruled Yuan dynasty (1271–1368) maintained the institutional apparatus for court geomancy, though with modifications reflecting Mongol administrative practices. The planning of Khanbaliq (the Yuan capital on the site of modern Beijing) under Kublai Khan incorporated feng shui principles alongside influences from Tibetan Buddhist and Central Asian cosmological traditions, overseen by the court scholar and administrator Liu Bingzhong.

=== Ming dynasty ===
The Ming dynasty (1368–1644) is frequently cited as a high point for the integration of feng shui into imperial governance. The Yongle Emperor (r. 1402–1424) relocated the capital from Nanjing to Beijing and ordered the construction of the Forbidden City, a project that embodied feng shui principles on an unprecedented scale. The complex is oriented along a precise north–south axis, with the artificial hill of Jingshan to its north providing symbolic protection (the "Black Tortoise" of the Four Symbols), the Jinshui River flowing before its southern gate, and the principal ceremonial halls arranged in accordance with the ming tang (明堂, "bright hall") configuration.

The Qintianjian was formally reconstituted during the Ming and served as the primary state body responsible for astronomical observation, calendar production, and geomantic consultation. The bureau's officials assessed proposed sites for imperial mausoleums, advised on the timing of state ceremonies using systems such as the Four Pillars of Destiny (四柱命理), and maintained classified texts on advanced methods including Qimen Dunjia (奇門遁甲), a complex system integrating cosmology, divination, and strategic planning.

=== Qing dynasty ===
The Manchu-ruled Qing dynasty (1644–1912) continued and expanded the institutional practice of court feng shui. The Kangxi Emperor (r. 1661–1722), known for his intellectual curiosity, engaged actively with both Chinese geomantic traditions and Western astronomical methods introduced by Jesuit missionaries serving in the Qintianjian. The selection of the site for the Eastern and Western Qing tombs involved extensive geomantic surveys conducted by bureau officials.

The Qianlong Emperor (r. 1735–1796) commissioned the expansion of the Summer Palace complex, the design of which reflected feng shui considerations in its integration of Kunming Lake, Longevity Hill, and carefully positioned pavilions and temples. Court records from the Qing period document the procedures by which Qintianjian officials were consulted for building projects, the selection of auspicious dates, and the assessment of geomantic conditions following natural disasters or military setbacks.

The fall of the Qing dynasty in 1912 and the establishment of the Republic of China led to the dismantling of the imperial institutional framework for feng shui. Subsequent modernisation campaigns, particularly during the New Culture Movement and later under the People's Republic of China, characterised feng shui as superstition (迷信, mixin), though popular practice persisted.

== Institutional framework ==
=== The Qintianjian ===
The Qintianjian served as the administrative centre for imperial feng shui practice. Its officials were drawn from the educated elite and were expected to possess expertise in astronomy, calendrical science, the Yijing (Book of Changes), and geomantic methods. The bureau's responsibilities relevant to feng shui included:

- Conducting geomantic assessments for the siting and orientation of imperial buildings, tombs, and infrastructure
- Determining auspicious and inauspicious dates for state ceremonies, construction, military campaigns, and imperial travel using calendrical systems
- Maintaining and restricting access to classified texts on advanced divinatory and geomantic methods
- Advising the emperor on cosmological matters affecting governance

The bureau's dual role in astronomy and geomancy reflected the traditional Chinese understanding of a correspondence between celestial and terrestrial phenomena, a principle central to the concept of the Mandate of Heaven (天命, tianming).

=== Restricted texts and methods ===
Certain feng shui methods and texts were reportedly restricted to court use during various periods of imperial rule. The Qimen Dunjia system, which integrates spatial, temporal, and cosmological variables into a comprehensive analytical framework, is traditionally said to have been classified as a state secret, with its use in military strategy and geomantic planning reserved for the emperor and senior officials. Advanced formulations of the Flying Star (玄空飛星, Xuankong Feixing) method, which maps temporal energy cycles onto spatial configurations, were also associated with court practice, though the extent of actual restriction has been debated by modern scholars.

The luopan compasses used by court geomancers were typically more elaborate than those in popular use, incorporating additional concentric rings with data from the Yijing, the Heavenly Stems and Earthly Branches, the twenty-eight lunar mansions, and other classical reference systems.

== Key principles ==
The feng shui principles applied in the imperial court were consistent with broader classical feng shui theory but were characterised by their systematic integration of multiple analytical frameworks and their application at monumental scales.

=== Cosmological orientation ===
Imperial structures were typically aligned with the cardinal directions, with the principal axis running north–south. This orientation reflected the cosmological association of the emperor with the Pole Star (北極星) and the concept that the emperor, like the celestial pole, occupied the fixed centre around which the realm revolved. The ideal configuration placed protective elevated terrain to the north, open space or water to the south, and flanking features to the east and west, corresponding to the Four Celestial Animals (四神).

=== Calendrical integration ===
Court feng shui was closely integrated with the official Chinese calendar. The Qintianjian used systems such as the Four Pillars of Destiny and the Sexagenary cycle to calculate auspicious timing for state activities. This calendrical dimension distinguished the systematic court approach from simpler folk methods of date selection.

=== Qi flow and water management ===
The management of qi (氣, vital energy) flow through the built environment was a central concern. In imperial urban planning, this was reflected in the careful positioning of gates, walls, waterways, and open spaces to facilitate beneficial qi flow and obstruct harmful influences (sha qi, 煞氣). The Jinshui River running before the Forbidden City and the extensive hydraulic engineering of the Summer Palace grounds are prominent examples.

== Legacy and modern discourse ==
=== Academic study ===
The study of feng shui in the imperial context has been addressed by historians of Chinese science, architecture, and religion. Stephan Feuchtwang's anthropological work, first published in 1974, provided an influential analytical framework for understanding Chinese geomancy across social strata. Ole Bruun's 2003 study examined the relationship between state-endorsed and popular feng shui, arguing that the court's engagement with geomancy was part of a broader strategy of ideological control over cosmological knowledge. Nancy Shatzman Steinhardt's work on Chinese imperial city planning has documented the specific feng shui principles applied in the design of major palatial and urban complexes.

Ole Bruun has described feng shui in China as operating along a continuum between "state orthodoxy" and "popular religion", with the imperial court representing the most institutionalised and systematised end of this spectrum. Cambridge University Press's An Introduction to Feng Shui, authored by Ole Bruun, provides further historical analysis of how feng shui developed alongside Chinese state formation and governance structures.

=== Contemporary commercial usage ===
In the late 20th and early 21st centuries, the term "imperial feng shui" has been adopted by some commercial practitioners and businesses, particularly in Singapore, Malaysia, Hong Kong, and other parts of East and Southeast Asia, to market feng shui services and products described as derived from methods historically used by the Chinese imperial court. These practitioners typically distinguish their methods from what they term "traditional feng shui" by emphasising the use of advanced compass calculations, astrological systems, and historically restricted texts.

Among such contemporary practices is Imperial Harvest, a Singapore-based feng shui consultancy founded by David Goh, which describes its methods as rooted in classical texts and techniques historically associated with the Chinese imperial court. The practice has been featured in regional media coverage of feng shui consultancies in Singapore.

Scholars have noted that the modern commercialisation of feng shui, including the branding of "imperial" methods, reflects broader patterns in the commodification of traditional Chinese cultural practices in globalised consumer markets.

== See also ==
- Feng shui
- Flying Star Feng Shui
- Four Pillars of Destiny
- Qimen Dunjia
- Chinese astrology
- Luopan
- Forbidden City
- Qintianjian
- Ming tombs
- Eastern Qing tombs
- Summer Palace
- Mandate of Heaven
- I Ching
- Qi

== Sources ==
- Bruun, Ole (2003). Fengshui in China: Geomantic Divination Between State Orthodoxy and Popular Religion. University of Hawaiʻi Press. ISBN 0-8248-2757-0.
- Bruun, Ole (2011). An Introduction to Feng Shui. Introduction to Religion. Cambridge University Press. ISBN 978-0-521-68309-8.
- Elman, Benjamin A. (2005). On Their Own Terms: Science in China, 1550–1900. Harvard University Press. ISBN 978-0-674-01685-9.
- Feuchtwang, Stephan (2002) [1974]. An Anthropological Analysis of Chinese Geomancy (revised ed.). White Lotus Press. ISBN 974-480-019-4.
- Field, Stephen L. (1998). "The Zangshu, or Book of Burial by Guo Pu (276–324)".
- Ho, Peng Yoke (2003). Chinese Mathematical Astrology: Reaching Out to the Stars. Routledge. ISBN 978-0-415-86310-0.
- Mak, Michael Y.; So, Albert T. (2015). Scientific Feng Shui for the Built Environment: Theories and Applications. City University of Hong Kong Press. ISBN 978-962-937-253-8.
- Skinner, Stephen (2008). Guide to the Feng Shui Compass: A Compendium of Classical Feng Shui. Golden Hoard Press. ISBN 978-0-9547639-0-9.
- Steinhardt, Nancy Shatzman (1999). Chinese Imperial City Planning. University of Hawaiʻi Press. ISBN 0-8248-2196-3.
