= Yang Yunsong =

Yang Yunsong (Chinese: 楊筠松, p Yáng Yúnsōng) was a Tang-era Taoist writer credited with the authorship of the Green Satchel Classic, a book dedicated to feng shui.
