= Michael Matthews =

Michael Matthews may refer to:

- Michael Matthews (American football) (born 1983), American football tight end
- Mike Matthews (wide receiver) (born 2005), American football wide receiver
- Michael Matthews (cyclist) (born 1990), Australian cyclist
- Michael Matthews (composer) (born 1950), Canadian composer
- Michael Matthews (cricketer) (1914–1940), English cricketer
- Michael Matthews (director), South African director
- Michael J. Matthews (1934–2014), U.S. politician
- Michael R. Matthews (born 1948), Australian philosopher of science
- Michael Gough Matthews (1931–2013), British pianist, teacher and musical administrator
- Mickey Matthews (born 1953), head football coach
- Mike Matthews (born 1973), baseball pitcher
