= Flying Star Feng Shui =

Discipline in Feng Shui

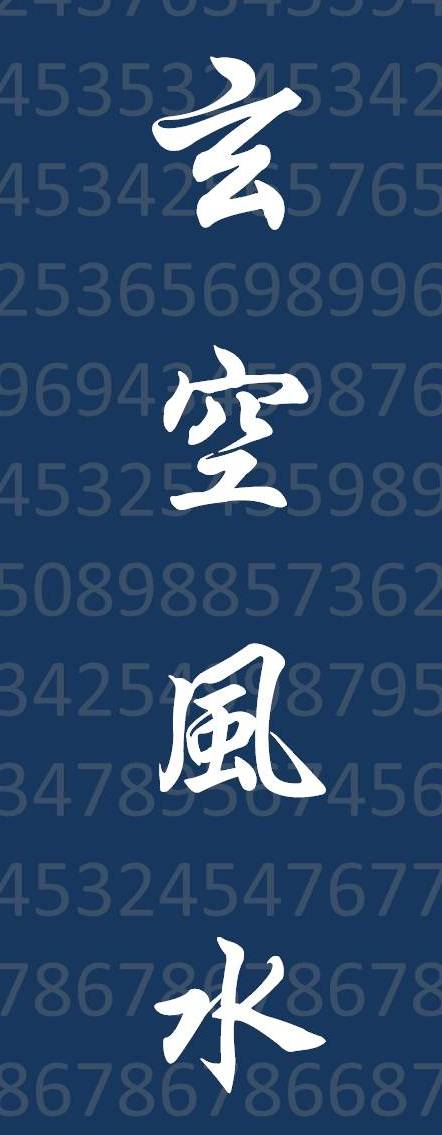
Flying Star Feng Shui is a discipline to create an astrological chart in order to analyze positive and negative auras of a building.

Xuan Kong Flying Star feng shui or Xuan Kong Fei Xing is a discipline in Feng Shui, and is an integration of the principles of Yin Yang, the interactions between the five elements, the eight trigrams, the Lo Shu numbers, and the 24 Mountains, by using time, space and objects to create an astrological chart to analyze positive auras and negative auras of a building.

These include analyzing wealth, mental and physiological states, success, relationships with external parties, and health of the inhabitant.

During the Qing Dynasty, it was popularized by grandmaster Shen Zhu Ren, with his book Mr. Shen's Study of Xuan Kong, or Shen Shi Xuan Kong Xue.

Flying Star Feng Shui does not limit itself to buildings for the living or Yang Zhai, where rules pertaining to directions equally apply to all built structures; it also applies to grave sites and buildings for spirits or Yin Zhai.

== Fundamentals ==
=== Numbers ===
Modern representation of the Lo Shu square as a magic square

In the Lo Shu Square, flying stars are nine numbers.

Each number in the Lo Shu represents one of the Chinese Trigrams and is related to an Element, Family Member, Cardinal, Colour, Hour, Season, Organ, Ailment and many others.

The numbers always move to the lower right (northwest), middle right (west), lower left (northeast), upper center (south), lower center (north), upper right (southwest), middle left (east), upper left (southeast) and back to the center.

=== Time ===
Time is divided into 20-Year cycles. Each cycle of 20 years is a Period or "Yun". A grand cycle comprises 9 Periods in total, which covers a span of 180 years.

Periods are used to describe the cyclical pattern of Qi. Different types of Qi have different strengths and weaknesses with the reference to a particular Period.

Periodic Table on Flying Stars

| Period | Recent Years | Five Elements | Trigrams | Direction | I-Ching |
|---|---|---|---|---|---|
| One | 1864–1883 | Water | Kan | North | Water |
| Two | 1884–1903 | Earth | Kun | Southwest | Plain land |
| Three | 1904–1923 | Wood | Zhen | East | Thunder |
| Four | 1924–1943 | Wood | Xun | Southeast | Wind |
| Five | 1944–1963 | Earth | – | Center | – |
| Six | 1964–1983 | Metal | Qian | Northwest | Heaven |
| Seven | 1984–2003 | Metal | Dui | West | Swamp |
| Eight | 2004–2023 | Earth | Gen | Northeast | Mountain |
| Nine | 2024–2043 | Fire | Li | South | Fire |

==== Timely and Untimely Flying Stars ====
A timely star is positive for a building whereas an untimely star is negative. For the current period, Period 8 (Year 2004–2023), stars Eight, Nine and One are timely (For a building, they are timely if and only if the object placed in that palace is timely). Star Eight is most timely which is often treated as Prosperous and Noble Star. Star Nine and Star One belong to Sheng Qi, a growing energy. The other six stars are regarded as having retreating, killing or dead qi.

=== Space ===
An accurate measurement of direction must be obtained before any system of Feng Shui can be undertaken.

A Luopan is a magnetic compass to determine the precise direction of a structure or an item.

==== 24 Mountains ====
The most important ring on the Luopan is the 24 Mountain ring.

On the 24 Mountain ring, each direction is subdivided into three sectors.

| Direction | Number | Trigram | 24 Mountains | Bearing / Degrees | Nature |
|---|---|---|---|---|---|
| South | 9 | Li 离 ☲ | Bing 丙 Wu 午 Ding 丁 | 157.6 – 172.5 172.6 – 187.5 187.6 – 202.5 | Yang Yin Yin |
| Southwest | 2 | Kun 坤 ☷ | Wei 未 Kun 坤 Shen 申 | 202.6 – 217.5 217.6 – 232.5 232.6 – 247.5 | Yin Yang Yang |
| West | 7 | Dui 兑 ☱ | Geng 庚 You 酉 Xin 辛 | 247.6 – 262.5 262.6 – 277.5 277.6 – 292.5 | Yang Yin Yin |
| Northwest | 6 | Qian 乾 ☰ | Xu 戌 Qian 乾 Hai 亥 | 292.6 – 307.5 307.6 – 322.5 322.6 – 337.5 | Yin Yang Yang |
| North | 1 | Kan 坎 ☵ | Ren 壬 Zi 子 Gui 癸 | 337.6 – 352.5 352.6 – 7.5 7.6 – 22.5 | Yang Yin Yin |
| Northeast | 8 | Gen 艮 ☶ | Chou 丑 Gen 艮 Yin 寅 | 22.6 – 37.5 37.6 – 52.5 52.6 – 67.5 | Yin Yang Yang |
| East | 3 | Zhen 震 ☳ | Jia 甲 Mao 卯 Yi 乙 | 67.6 – 82.5 82.6 – 97.5 97.6 – 112.5 | Yang Yin Yin |
| Southeast | 4 | Xun 巽 ☴ | Chen 辰 Xun 巽 Si 巳 | 112.6 – 127.5 127.6 – 142.5 142.6 – 157.5 | Yin Yang Yang |

==== Taking Directions ====
Using the principles of Yin and Yang, the facing of a building is determined by the side of the built structure that receives most Yang Qi.

A house is constructed with an architectural frontage with its side that faces whatever landscape feature. The facing of that house is considered by the direction of its frontage which is most Yang in nature.

In apartments, or condominiums, the facing of a unit is determined by the facing of the entire building. If the structure is not an obvious facade, the facing of the unit is determined by the side of the building having the most Yang energy (faces the busiest crowd flow).

==== Taking locations ====
Energy in a building can be tapped into by locating a person within a sector that houses the energy. Ideally, living objects should be located in a sector with positive Qi as determined by Flying Star Chart.

The layout of a building is demarcated with a Nine Palace grid, which looks like a tic-tac-toe grid. A door, room or other object's location refers to the square within this grid where the object is found. This may or may not correspond to the direction that the object faces. A door could be located in the southwest sector, but face south. Its location could be also southwest, and its direction to be facing to the south.

=== Objects ===
Objects are essential to evaluate the Feng Shui of a building.

==== Mountain ====
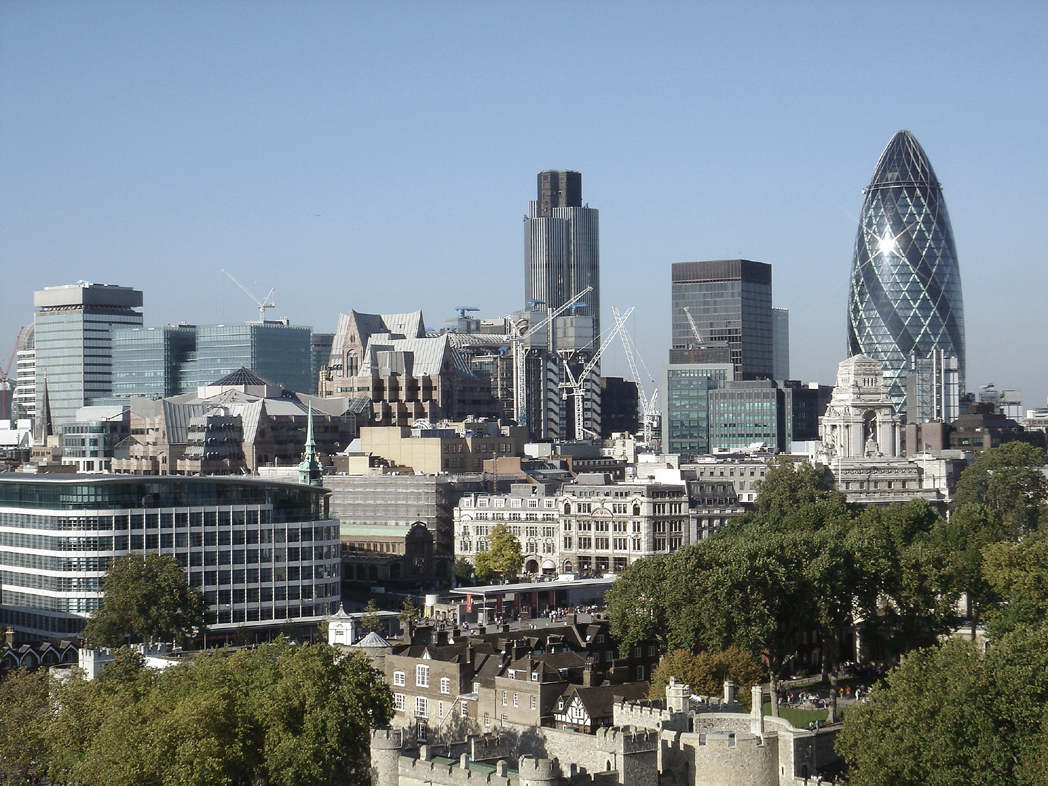
Skyscrapers and apartments are mountains.

Mountain generates Qi. A lush and green mountain or hill generates auspicious Qi, while a barren, rocky rising area will, in general, generate inauspicious energy.

In urban areas, skyscrapers, apartments or any structure that rises from the ground have a similar role to a mountain: generating energy outside. From inside, cupboards, wardrobes, or any furniture that is taller or larger than any others nearby are also considered mountains.

==== Water ====
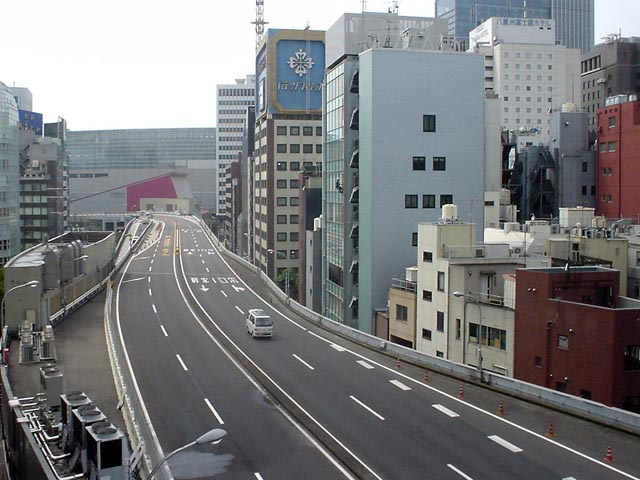
Highways and roads are forms of water in Feng Shui.

Water conducts Qi. It is essential to identify the cleanliness of the water, the location and the flow of the water formation. These include ponds, lakes, rivers, drains and fountains.

In urban areas, highways and lowlands play a similar role to waterways, conducting Qi. Inside a building or a room, a spinning fan or anything lower than ground level is considered water.

== Nine-Palace Flying Stars ==
Nine Palace Flying Stars or Jiu Gong Fei Xing is another name of the Flying Stars method whereby palaces are the nine sectors overlaid onto a layout of the house.

=== Flying Star Chart ===
A Flying Star chart consists of three numbers in each Palace of the Luo Shu. These numbers are called the Base Star, the Facing Star and the Sitting Star.

Constructing a Flying Star Chart requires the dates that the building was occupied by the owners and the facing of the building

For example, if a building is constructed in the year 2003, but the residents do not move in until February 4 of 2004, the Period of the building is 8, not 7.

The period does not change again unless there is major renovation undertaken to the structure.

=== Rules and Procedures ===
Creating a Flying Star chart is always begun with the Base Star. The period of the building determines the number occupies the Base Star position of the Central Palace. Base Stars always fly in the Luo Shu path.

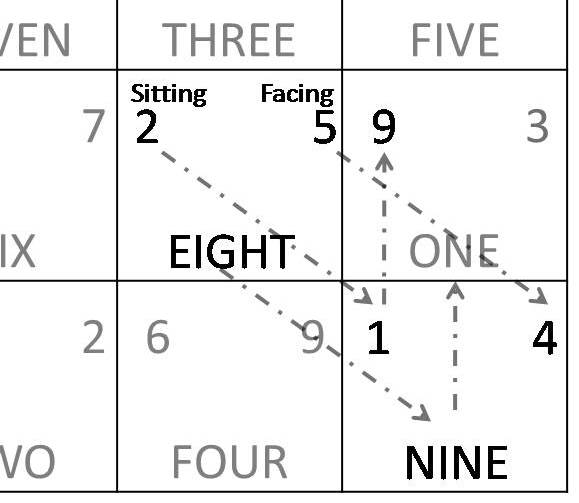
Constructing a flying star chart.

Once all the base stars are distributed amongst the nine palaces, the number in Facing Palace on the Luo Shu grid is determined by the facing direction of the building. This number is the facing star.

The Sitting Palace is always opposite of the Facing Palace. The sitting star is the number in the sitting palace.

For instance, in a Period-8 building that faces southwest, the number that locates in Facing Palace is number 5 whereas the number in Sitting Palace is number 2; thus, 5 is Facing Star and 2 is Sitting Star.

Unlike the Base Star, the Facing Star and Sitting Star can fly in either ascending (Yang) order, or descending (Yin) order. The order depends upon two factors: whether the star is an even number or an odd number, and which mountain the unit faces.

Even-numbered Stars follow a Yin-Yang-Yang form. In a certain number which comprises three mountains, if the mountain that the property faces is Yang, then the numbers fly in ascending order of Lo Shu path, and vice versa.

Odd-numbered Stars follow a Yang-Yin-Yin form. In a certain number which comprises three mountains, if the mountain that the property faces is Yang, then the numbers fly in ascending order of Lo Shu path, and vice versa.

To determine the polarity of number 5 star, go by the polarity of the Period number.

== Properties of Nine Stars ==
=== Timely and Untimely ===
Flying stars can be timely or untimely. The nature of flying star depends on which period is to be referred and which star is being activated.

=== Portents and Natures ===
| Flying Star | Body Part | Person / Family member | Timely / Positive Nature | Untimely / Negative Nature |
|---|---|---|---|---|
| 1 | Kidney, bladder, reproductive system, lymphatic system, ears | Middle-aged men males (30s), middle son | Fame, fortune, wisdom, scholars, health | Health: Sexual disease, diabetes, Ear disorder Activities: Separation, divorce, Drowning, Sea Pirates and criminal affairs, Prostitution, Sex industry |
| 2 | Digestive system (stomach, spleen and pancreas) | Mother, grandmother, older females | Fertility, good health, land and real estate development | Health: Abdominal disease, miscarriage Activities: Disastrous, accidents |
| 3 | Liver and gall bladder, feet and arms | Eldest son, matured males, husband | Fame, ambition, ranking | Health: foot disease, liver cancer, arm injury Activities: Lawsuit, theft, asthma |
| 4 | Liver and gall bladder, thigh, breast and chest | Eldest daughter, matured females, wife | Wisdom, romance, literacy, reputation | Health: breast cancer, Asthma, tight injury Adultery, breaking of family, insanity, suicide by hanging or drug, unethical behavior, unfaithfulness |
| 5 | – | – | Great success, great wealth, imperialism, authority | Plague, lawsuit, catastrophe, disloyalty, the worst amongst the others, death |
| 6 | Lungs, large intestine, bones | Father, grandfather, elderly men | Authority, dignity, determination, leadership | Health: skull injury, brain cancer, headache, lung disease, intestine cancer, fracture Activities: Loneliness, rigid, car accident, authority clash |
| 7 | Upper jaw, teeth and mouth, upper respiratory system | Youngest daughter, young girls, young ladies | Happiness, wealth | Health: Mouth disease, toothache, mandible injury Activities: Theft, robbery, gossips, villains, flirting |
| 8 | Fingers, toes, nose, back | Youngest son, young boys, young men | Extreme wealth, nobility, steadfastness | Health: Fingers or toes injury, nosebleed, back pain, nose cancer Activities: Injury to children, disloyalty, rioting, wealth loss in seconds |
| 9 | Heart, blood, small intestine, tongue, eye | Middle-aged females (30s), middle daughter | Immense success, promotion, marriage, celebrations | Health: Eye disease, blood cancer, intellectual disability, blindness, tongue malfunction, heart attack Activities: fire, inappropriate sexual affairs, stupidity |

=== Famous Combination of Stars ===
==== Bull fight ====
Result of overcoming of untimely Flying Star 3 (Wood) upon Star 2 (Earth)
Relationship: Son harassing mother-in-law, a male violating a woman
Activities: Problems (Conflict, arguments, combat, lawsuit, disharmonies) for mother
Health: woman is hurt at the belly (while pregnant) or having stomachache
Cure: introduce a red carpet or a painting that is red. Red represents fire and will be able to change the effect that wood has on earth (control cycle) into a wood, fire and earth, supporting cycle.

==== Death and Disastrous ====
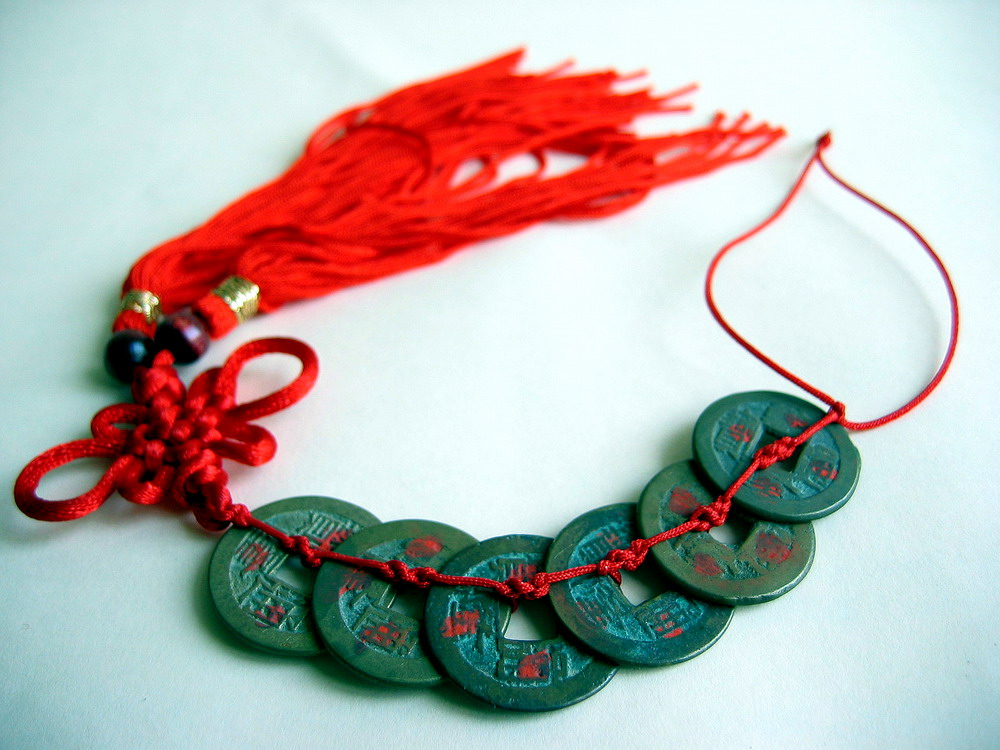
Six coins (Metal) in a red string is used to diminish the disastrous effect of Stars 2 and 5 (Earth).

Result of combination of untimely Flying Stars 2 (Earth) and 5 (Earth)
Activities: Accidents, bankruptcy, haunted house, death
Health: Serious sickness, cancer of the digestive system

==== Fire hazard ====
Result of fire combination of untimely Flying Stars 2 (Earth) and 7 (Metal), or of untimely Flying Stars 7 (Metal) and 9 (Fire)
Relationship: Lesbian, Male with strong female personalities
Activities: Fire, explosion

==== Penetrating the heart ====
Result of combination of untimely Flying Stars 3 (Wood) and 7 (Metal)
Relationship: Male and female fight
Activities: Cripple, armed robbery, burglary, lawsuit, scams
Health: foot disease, liver cancer, arm injury by metal

==== Wisdom ====
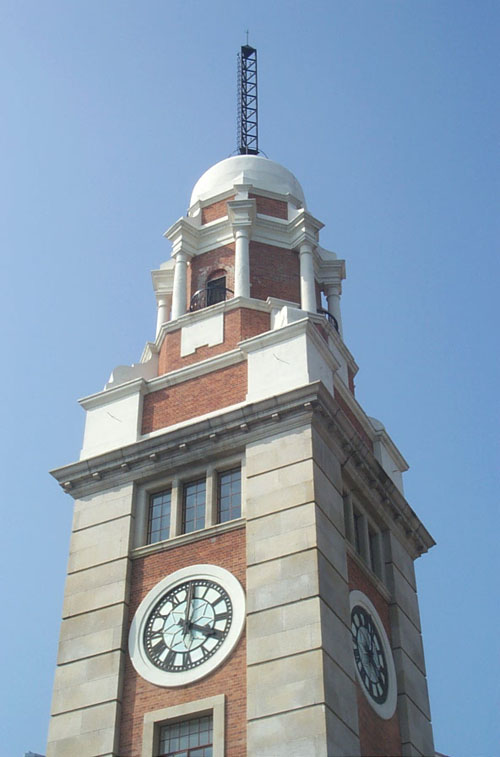
A clock tower can be an object to nurture wisdom with the influence of timely flying star; or to bring disastrous consequence under untimely star.

Result of combination of timely Flying Stars 1 (Water) and 4 (Wood),
or combination of timely Flying Stars 3 (Wood) and 9 (Fire),
or combination of timely Flying Stars 1 (Water) and 6 (Metal)
Activities: Intelligence, Splendid for studies and research

==== Metal in battle ====
Result of metal combination of untimely Flying Stars 6 and 7.
Relationship: combat and competition between brothers
Activities: Conflict, armed robbery, death by metal

==== Rich and Authority ====
Result of combination of timely Flying Stars 6 and 8, or timely Flying Stars 2 and 6
Activities: Success in business, especially real estate or owning land, Inheritance, Great authority

==== Fame and Celebration ====
Result of combination of timely Flying Stars 8 (Earth) and 9 (Fire)
Activities: Promotion, Marriage, Birth, Fame, Championship

== Chemistry of Flying Stars ==
According to I-Ching, south direction belongs to fire. However, in a building, the south sector may not be a fire. The nature of a palace depends on the combination among elements of the base star, of the sitting star, of the facing star and of the Heaven Trigram.

For example, a house that faces bearing 337.6 – 352.5 was built in 2001, and was occupied by residents in 2006.

Period of the house: Period 8, since 2006 is the year of occupying

Facing: Ren mountain in North direction, bearing 337.6 – 352.5

Sitting: Bing mountain in South direction, opposite of the facing

=== Timely Flying Star ===
Timely flying star is a catalyst to the phase combination of Sitting Star, Facing Star, Base Star and Heavenly Trigram, implying whether to boost the current aura to best or to the opposite. For example, annual Star 1 (Water) has the ability to combat the competition of metallic stars 6 and 7.

==== Annual and Monthly Flying Stars ====
In Sexagenary cycle, a new Chinese year begins on start of spring, which usually falls on February 4. The annual flying star that visits the center palace has to be subtracted by one every Chinese year. Once Star 1 is reached, annual star would loop back around to 9 in next year.

Star 1 occupies center palace in 1999, 2008, 2017 and so on.

Annual and monthly stars always follow Lo Shu path.

| Monthly star residing the center sector | Feb | Mar | Apr | May | Jun | Jul | Aug | Sep | Oct | Nov | Dec | Jan |
|---|---|---|---|---|---|---|---|---|---|---|---|---|
| Years Rat, Rabbit, Horse, Rooster | 8 | 7 | 6 | 5 | 4 | 3 | 2 | 1 | 9 | 8 | 7 | 6 |
| Years Ox, Dragon, Goat, Dog | 5 | 4 | 3 | 2 | 1 | 9 | 8 | 7 | 6 | 5 | 4 | 3 |
| Years Tiger, Snake, Monkey, Pig | 2 | 1 | 9 | 8 | 7 | 6 | 5 | 4 | 3 | 2 | 1 | 9 |

==== Daily Flying Star ====
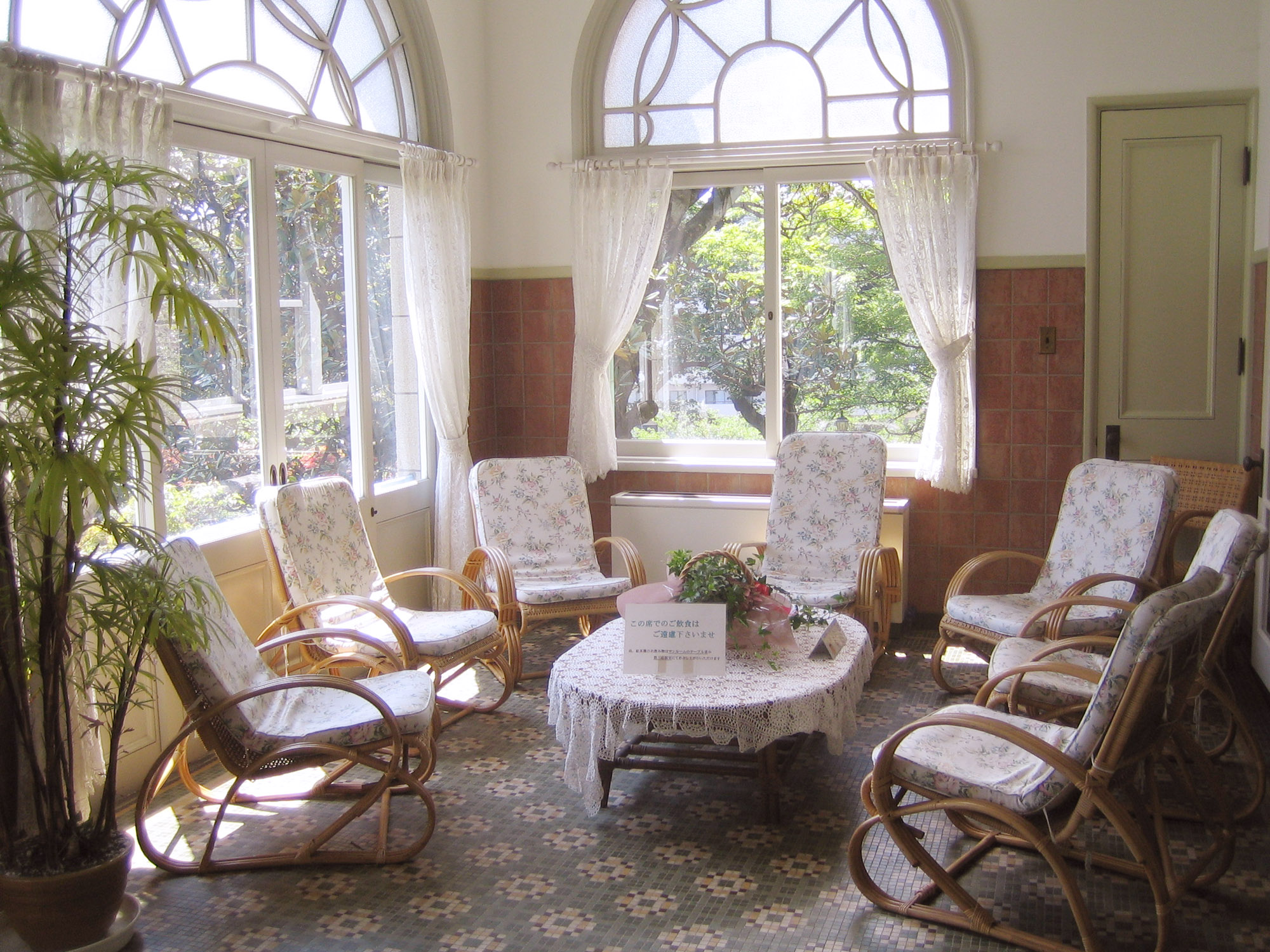
Daily and bihourly flying stars are usually applied to predict the time of a happening.

Daily Flying Stars are governed by,

RULE 1: From the onset of Winter Solstice until Summer Solstice in the following year, the daily stars progress in ascending order (... 7,8,9,1, 2, 3, ...). The stars are distributed around the nine palaces following Lo Shu path.

On the very first Yang Wood Rat day or Jia-zi day after Winter Solstice, daily Star 1 presides the center palace.

RULE 2: From the onset of Summer Solstice until the next Winter Solstice, the daily stars progress in a descending order (... 3,2,1,9,8,7,...). The stars are distributed around the nine palaces fleeing Lo Shu path.

On the very first Yang Wood Rat day or Jia-zi day after Summer Solstice, daily Star 9 presides the center palace.

==== Bihourly Flying Star ====
Bi-hourly Flying Stars are ruled by,

RULE 1: From the onset of Winter Solstice until Summer Solstice in the following year, the bi-hourly stars are distributed around the nine palaces following Lo Shu path. The stars progress in ascending order every bi-hourly.

On Rat, Rabbit, Horse, and Rooster days, star 1 occupies the center sector at Rat hour (11 pm of previous day – 1 am). On Ox, Dragon, Goat, and Dog days, star 4 occupies the center sector at Rat hour. On Tiger, Snake, Monkey, Pig days, star 7 occupies the center sector at Rat hour.

RULE 2: From the onset of Summer Solstice until next Winter Solstice, the bi-hourly stars are distributed around the nine palaces fleeing Lo Shu path. The stars progress in descending order every bi-hourly.

On Rat, Rabbit, Horse, and Rooster days, star 9 occupies the center sector at Rat hour. On Ox, Dragon, Goat, and Dog days, star 6 occupies the center sector at Rat hour. On Tiger, Snake, Monkey, Pig days, star 3 occupies the center sector at Rat hour.

== See also ==
- 5 Elements (Wu Xing)
- Bagua
- Chinese calendar
- Feng shui
- Luopan
- 9 Star Ki
- Yin and yang
