= Book of Burial =

4th- or 5th-century Taoist text by Guo Pu

The Book of Burial (Chinese: t 葬書, s 葬书, p Zàngshū) was a 4th or 5th-century AD work by the Eastern Jin period Taoist mystic Guo Pu.

The work was a commentary on the now-lost Classic of Burial (t 葬經, s 葬经); as it survived and transmitted the classic's teachings, the Book of Burial's principles relating the flow of qi to the appropriateness of a tomb's location were influential on the development of fengshui.

== See also ==
- Green Satchel Classic
