= Green Satchel Classic =

The Green Satchel Classic (Traditional Chinese:青囊經, Simplified Chinese: 青囊经, Pinyin: Qīngnángjīng) was a late-9th-century AD work attributed to the Tang writer Yang Yunsong. With the loss of the original Classic of Burial, it is one of the few surviving "classic" texts concerning the principles guiding the Chinese practice of fengshui.

It is also known as the Esoteric Pronouncements of the Green Satchel (Traditional Chinese: 青囊奥語; Simplified Chinese: 青囊奥语; Pinyin: Qīngnáng'àoyǔ).
