= Non-wellfounded mereology =

Topic in metaphysics

In philosophy, specifically metaphysics, mereology is the study of parthood relationships. In mathematics and formal logic, wellfoundedness prohibits $\cdots<x<\cdots<x<\cdots$ for any x.

Thus non-wellfounded mereology treats topologically circular, cyclical, repetitive, or other eventual self-containment.

More formally, non-wellfounded partial orders may exhibit $\cdots<x<\cdots<x<\cdots$ for some x whereas well-founded orders prohibit that.

== See also ==
- Aczel's anti-foundation axiom
- Peter Aczel
- John Barwise
- Steve Awodey
- Dana Scott
