= Yin and yang =

Cosmological dualism in Chinese philosophy

- A taijitu of a particular style that is often named a "yin and yang symbol", the black area representing yin, with the opposite white side representing yang. The dots are representative of one within the other.

Chinese name
- Traditional Chinese: 陰陽
- Simplified Chinese: 阴阳
Transcriptions
Standard Mandarin
- Hanyu Pinyin: yīnyáng
- Bopomofo: ㄧㄣ ㄧㄤˊ
- Gwoyeu Romatzyh: inyang
- Wade–Giles: yin^{1}-yang^{2}
- Tongyong Pinyin: yin-yáng
- IPA: [ín.jǎŋ]
Hakka
- Romanization: yim^{1}-yong^{2}
Yue: Cantonese
- Yale Romanization: yām yèuhng
- Jyutping: jam1 joeng4
- IPA: [jɐm˥ jœŋ˩]
Southern Min
- Hokkien POJ: im-iông
- Tâi-lô: im-iông
Middle Chinese
- Middle Chinese: 'im-yang
Old Chinese
- Baxter (1992): *ʔrjum ljang
- Baxter–Sagart (2014): *q(r)um lang

Vietnamese name
- Vietnamese alphabet: âm dương
- Chữ Hán: 陰陽

Korean name
- Hangul: 음양
- Hanja: 陰陽
Transcriptions
- Revised Romanization: eumyang
- McCune–Reischauer: ŭmyang

Mongolian name
- Mongolian Cyrillic: арга билиг
- Mongolian script: ᠠᠷᠭ᠎ᠠ ᠪᠢᠯᠢᠭ

Japanese name
- Kanji: 陰陽
- Hiragana: いんよう; おんよう; おんみょう
- Katakana: インヨウ; オンヨウ; オンミョウ
Transcriptions
- Revised Hepburn: in'yō; on'yō; onmyō
- Kunrei-shiki: in'you; on'you; onmyou

Originating in ancient Chinese philosophy, yin and yang (traditional Chinese: 陰陽; simplified Chinese: 阴阳; pinyin: yīn yáng, English: /jɪn/, /jæŋ/) or yin-yang is the concept that there exist cosmic principles or forces that are opposite but complementary, which interact, interconnect, support and perpetuate each other. Together they form a dynamic system in which the whole is greater than the interdependent components, and both parts are essential for the cohesion of the whole.

In Chinese mythology, the universe develops out of a primary chaos of primordial qi or material energy, organized into the cycles of yin and yang, force and motion leading to form and matter. "Yin" is retractive, passive, contractive and receptive in nature in a contrasting relationship to "yang", which is repelling, active, expansive and repulsive in principle. This dichotomy in some form is seen in all things in nature and their patterns of change, difference and transformations. For example, biological, psychological and cosmological seasonal cycles, the historical evolution of landscapes over days, weeks, years to eons. The original meaning of yin was depicted as the northerly shaded side of a hill and yang being the bright southerly aspect. When pertaining to traditional human gender, yin is associated with more rounded feminine characteristics and yang as sharp and masculine traits.

Taiji is a Chinese cosmological term for the "Supreme Ultimate" state of undifferentiated absolute and infinite potential, the oneness before duality, from which yin and yang originate. It can be contrasted with the older wuji (無極; 'without pole'). In the cosmology pertaining to yin and yang, the material energy which this universe was created from is known as qi. It is believed that the organization of qi in this cosmology of yin and yang is the formation of the 10 thousand things between Heaven and Earth.

Included among these forms are humans. Many natural dualities (such as light and dark, fire and water, expanding and contracting) are thought of as physical manifestations of the duality symbolized by yin and yang. This duality, as a unity of opposites, lies at the origins of many branches of classical Chinese science, technology and philosophy, as well as being a primary guideline of traditional Chinese medicine, and a central principle of different forms of Chinese martial arts and exercise, such as baguazhang, tai chi, daoyin, kung fu and qigong, as well as appearing in the pages of the I Ching and the famous Taoist medical treatise called the Huangdi Neijing.

In Taoist metaphysics, distinctions between good and bad, along with other dichotomous moral judgments, are perceptual, not real; so, the duality of yin and yang is an indivisible whole. In the ethics of Confucianism on the other hand, most notably in the philosophy of Dong Zhongshu (c. 2nd century BC), a moral dimension is attached to the idea of yin and yang. The Ahom philosophy of duality of the individual self han and pu is based on the concept of the hun 魂 and po 魄 that are the yin and yang of the mind in the philosophy of Taoism. The tradition was originated in Yunnan, China and followed by some Ahom, descendants of the Dai ethnic minority.

== Linguistic aspects ==
=== Characters ===
yīnyáng in seal script (top), as well as traditional (middle) and simplified (bottom) character forms

The Chinese characters 陰 and 陽 are both phono-semantic compounds, with semantic component 阝 'mound', 'hill', a graphical variant of 阜—with the phonetic components 今; jīn (and the added semantic component 云; yún; 'cloud') and 昜; yáng. In the latter, 昜; yáng; 'bright' features 日; 'the Sun' + 示 + 彡; 'sunbeam'.

=== Pronunciations and etymologies ===
The Standard Chinese pronunciation of 陰 is the level first tone as yīn with the meaning 'cloudy', 'shady', 'negative (electric.)', 'feminine', 'moon', 'implicit', 'hidden', 'genitalia'. 陽; 'sunny', 'positive (electric.)', 'male' is pronounced with the rising second tone as yáng.

Compare these Middle Chinese and Old Chinese (Note: With an asterisk, to denote unattested forms.) reconstructions of 陰; yīn and 陽; yáng:

- ˑiəm < *ˑiəm and iang < *diang (Bernhard Karlgren)
  - ʔjəm and *raŋ (Li Fang-Kuei)
- ʔ(r)jum and *ljang (William H. Baxter)
- ʔjəm < *ʔəm and jiaŋ < *laŋ (Axel Schuessler)
- im < *qrum and yang < *laŋ (William H. Baxter and Laurent Sagart)

Schuessler gives probable Sino-Tibetan etymologies for both Chinese words.

yin < *ʔəm compares with Burmese ʔum^{C} 'overcast', 'cloudy', Adi muk-jum 'shade', and Lepcha so'yǔm 'shade'; it is probably cognate with Chinese àn < *ʔə̂mʔ 黯; 'dim'', ''gloomy'' and qīn < *khəm 衾; 'blanket'.

yang < *laŋ compares with Lepcha a-lóŋ 'reflecting light', Burmese laŋ^{B} 'be bright' and ə-laŋ^{B} 'light'; and is perhaps cognate with Chinese chāng < *k-hlaŋ 昌; 'prosperous'', ''bright' (compare areal words like Tai plaŋ^{A1} 'bright' & Proto-Viet-Muong hlaŋ^{B}). To this word-family, Unger also includes 炳; bǐng < *pl(j)aŋʔ 'bright'; however Schuessler reconstructs 炳; bǐng's Old Chinese pronunciation as *braŋʔ and includes it in an Austroasiatic word family, besides 亮; liàng < *raŋh 爽; shuǎng < *sraŋʔ 'twilight of dawn'; míng < *mraŋ 明 'bright', 'become light', 'enlighten'; owing to "the different OC initial consonant which seems to have no recognizable OC morphological function".

=== Meanings ===
Yin and yang are semantically complex words.

John DeFrancis's ABC Chinese-English Comprehensive Dictionary gives the following translation equivalents.

Yin 陰 or 阴—Noun: ① [philosophy] female/passive/negative principle in nature, ② Surname; Bound morpheme: ① the moon, ② shaded orientation, ③ covert; concealed; hidden, ④ vagina, ⑤ penis, ⑥ of the netherworld, ⑦ negative, ⑧ north side of a hill, ⑨ south bank of a river, ⑩ reverse side of a stele, ⑪ in intaglio; Stative verb: ① overcast, ② sinister; treacherous

Yang 陽 or 阳—Bound morpheme: ① [Chinese philosophy] male/active/positive principle in nature, ② the sun, ③ male genitals, ④ in relief, ⑤ open; overt, ⑥ belonging to this world, ⑦ [linguistics] masculine, ⑧ south side of a hill, ⑨ north bank of a river

The compound yinyang 陰陽 means "yin and yang; opposites; ancient Chinese astronomy; occult arts; astrologer; geomancer; etc."

The sinologist Rolf Stein glosses Chinese yin 陰 as "shady side (of a mountain)" and yang 陽 as "sunny side (of a mountain)" with the uncommon English geographic terms ubac "shady side of a mountain" and adret "sunny side of a mountain" (which are of French origin).

=== Toponymy ===
Many Chinese place names or toponyms contain the word yang 'sunny side', and a few contain yin 'shady side'. In China, as elsewhere in the Northern Hemisphere, sunlight comes predominantly from the south, and thus the south face of a mountain or the north bank of a river will receive more direct sunlight than the opposite side. For example, Yang refers to the "south side of a hill" in Hengyang 衡陽, which is south of Mount Heng 衡山 in Hunan, and to the "north bank of a river" in Luoyang 洛陽, which is located north of the Luo River 洛河 in Henan. Similarly, yin refers to "north side of a hill" in Huayin 華陰, which is north of Mount Hua 華山 in Shaanxi province.

In Japan, the characters are used in western Honshu to delineate the north-side San'in region 山陰 from the south-side San'yō region 山陽, separated by the Chūgoku Mountains 中国山地.

=== Loanwords ===
English yin, yang, and yin-yang are familiar loanwords of Chinese origin.

The Oxford English Dictionary (OED) defines:

yin (jɪn) Also Yin, Yn. [Chinese yīn shade, feminine; the moon.]

a. In Chinese philosophy, the feminine or negative principle (characterized by dark, cold, wetness, passivity, disintegration, etc.) of the two opposing cosmic forces into which creative energy divides and whose fusion in physical matter brings the phenomenal world into being. Also attrib. or as adj., and transf. Cf. yang.

b. Comb., as yin-yang, the combination or fusion of the two cosmic forces; freq. attrib., esp. as yin-yang symbol, a circle divided by an S-shaped line into a dark and a light segment, representing respectively yin and yang, each containing a 'seed' of the other.

yang (jæŋ) Also Yang. [Chinese yáng yang, sun, positive, male genitals.]

a. In Chinese philosophy, the masculine or positive principle (characterized by light, warmth, dryness, activity, etc.) of the two opposing cosmic forces into which creative energy divides and whose fusion in physical matter brings the phenomenal world into being. Also attrib. or as adj. Cf. yin.

b. Comb.: yang-yin = yin-yang s.v. yin b.

For the earliest recorded "yin and yang" usages, the OED cites 1671 for yin and yang, 1850 for yin-yang, and 1959 for yang-yin.

In English, yang-yin (like ying-yang) occasionally occurs as a mistake or typographical error for the Chinese loanword yin-yang—yet they are not equivalents. Chinese does have some yangyin collocations, such as 洋銀 (lit. 'foreign silver') "silver coin/dollar", but not even the most comprehensive dictionaries (e.g., the Hanyu Da Cidian) enter yangyin *陽陰. While yang and yin can occur together in context, yangyin is not synonymous with yinyang. The linguistic term "irreversible binomial" refers to a collocation of two words A–B that cannot be idiomatically reversed as B–A, for example, English cat and mouse (not *mouse and cat) and friend or foe (not *foe or friend).

Similarly, the usual pattern among Chinese binomial compounds is for positive A and negative B, where the A word is dominant or privileged over B. For example, tiandi 天地 "heaven and earth" and nannü 男女 "men and women". Yinyang meaning "dark and light; female and male; moon and sun", is an exception. Scholars have proposed various explanations for why yinyang violates this pattern, including "linguistic convenience" (it is easier to say yinyang than yangyin), the idea that "proto-Chinese society was matriarchal", or perhaps, since yinyang first became prominent during the late Warring States period, this term was "purposely directed at challenging persistent cultural assumptions".

== History ==
The oldest iconography has been found on an urn-shaped coffin in Ruzhou from the Yangshao culture period, around 4500 BCE. The images appear to be of two black male genitalia rotating in opposite directions in a circular pattern on a white background, with the image suggesting that the worship of male reproduction was present in the area. While it's theorised that the concept of mythological duality and regeneration must have been already present, the use of it on a coffin suggests it might have an unknown afterlife mythological connotation. Further more, the use of black for male genitalia instead of assumed white, two penises but no female genitalia, and the decorative use of purely male icons on a coffin (death and netherworld association), suggests a similar but alternative framework.

Joseph Needham discusses yin and yang together with Five Elements as part of the School of Naturalists. He says that it would be proper to begin with yin and yang before Five Elements because the former: "lay, as it were, at a deeper level in Nature, and were the most ultimate principles of which the ancient Chinese could conceive. But it so happens that we know a good deal more about the historical origin of the Five-Element theory than about that of the yin and the yang, and it will therefore be more convenient to deal with it first."

He then discusses Zou Yan (鄒衍; 305–240 BC) who is most associated with these theories. Although yin and yang are not mentioned in any of the surviving documents of Zou Yan, his school was known as the Yin Yang Jia (Yin and Yang School). Needham concludes "There can be very little doubt that the philosophical use of the terms began about the beginning of the 4th century BC, and that the passages in older texts which mention this use are interpolations made later than that time."

== Nature ==
Yin and yang are a concept that originated in ancient Chinese philosophy that describes how opposite or contrary forces may create each other by their comparison and are to be seen as actually complementary, interconnected, and interdependent in the natural world, and how they may give rise to each other as they interrelate to one another.

In Daoist philosophy, dark and light, yin and yang, arrive in the Tao Te Ching at chapter 42.

It is impossible to talk about yin or yang without some reference to the opposite, traditionally it is said that Yin and Yang are known by the comparison of each other, since yin and yang are bound together as parts of a mutual whole (for example, there cannot be the bottom of the foot without the top). A way to illustrate this idea is to postulate the notion of a race with only women or only men; this race would disappear in a single generation. Yet, women and men together create new generations that allow the race they mutually create (and mutually come from) to thrive or survive. The interaction of the two gives birth to humans, as does the interaction of heaven and earth establishes harmony (he), giving birth to things.

== Modern usage ==
Yin is the black side, and yang is the white side. Other color arrangements have included the white of yang being replaced by red. The taijitu is sometimes accompanied by other shapes, such as bagua.

In turn, the concepts are also applied to the human body. In traditional Chinese medicine, one's health is directly related to the balance between yin and yang qualities within them. The technology of yin and yang is the foundation of critical and deductive reasoning for effective differential diagnosis of disease and illnesses within Taoist influenced traditional Chinese medicine.

=== Taijitu ===
The principle of yin and yang is represented by the taijitu (literally "diagram of the Supreme Ultimate"). The term is commonly used to mean the simple "divided circle" form, but may refer to any of several schematic diagrams representing these principles, such as the swastika, common to Hinduism, Buddhism, and Jainism. Similar symbols have also appeared in other cultures, such as in Celtic art and Roman shield markings.

In this symbol the two water droplets swirl and mixing to represent its two intertransformative forms moving from turbid murky yin to the pure clear yang and back again. The two droplets are opposite in direction to each other to show that as one increases the other decreases but at the same time are equal in volume and substance denoting a state of dynamic tension. The dot of the opposite field in the droplets shows that they are infinitely divisible depicting there is always yin within yang and always yang within yin and the S- curve through the centre representative of the amount of yin or yang that is present when night turns to day. By drawing a horizontal and vertical line forming a cross directly through its centre will give the observation of the quantities of yin and yang that are present in all four seasons of the year on this planet.

=== Tai chi ===
Tai chi, a form of martial art, is often described as the principles of yin and yang applied to the human body and an animal body. Wu Jianquan, a famous Chinese martial arts teacher, described tai chi (taijiquan) as follows:

Various people have offered different explanations for the name Taijiquan. Some have said: – 'In terms of self-cultivation, one must train from a state of movement towards a state of stillness. Taiji comes about through the balance of yin and yang. In terms of the art of attack and defense then, in the context of the changes of full and empty, one is constantly internally latent, not revealed outward, as if the yin and yang of Taiji have not yet separated.' Others say: 'Every movement of Taijiquan is based on circles, just like the shape of a Taijitu. Therefore, it is called Taijiquan.

— Wu Jianquan, The International Magazine of Tʻai Chi Chʻüan

== See also ==
- Ayin and Yesh
- Chinese numismatic charm
- Dialectic
- Dualistic cosmology
- Enantiodromia
- Feng Shui in the Chinese Imperial Court
- Flag of Mongolia
- Flag of South Korea
- Flag of Tibet
- Fu Xi
- Gankyil
- Huangdi Neijing
- Ometeotl
- Onmyōdō
- Seny and Rauxa
- Taegeuk
- Tomoe
- Yin Yang fish
- Yin yang fried rice
- Yin Yang Shiyi Mai Jiujing
- Yin-yang-style baguazhang
- Yinyanggong, personified yin and yang deity
  - Shatkona
- Zhuangzi
