= Michael R. Matthews =

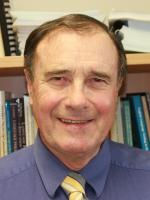
Michael R. Matthews

Michael Robert Matthews (born 1948) is an honorary associate professor in the School of Education at the University of New South Wales. He has researched and published in philosophy of education, history and philosophy of science (HPS), and science education. For nearly fifty years he has taught, researched and published on the utilisation of HPS in illuminating theoretical, curricular and pedagogical problems in science education.

His first degree was in geology, his subsequent degrees have been in psychology, philosophy, history and philosophy of education, and philosophy of education. He has taught science in high school, philosophy of education at Sydney Teachers College, he was foundation professor of science education at the University of Auckland and he retired as an associate professor at UNSW in 2008, becoming then an honorary associate professor.

== Early life, education and career ==
Matthews was born 19 May 1948 in Sydney, Australia. His schooling was at a small De La Salle Brothers ("French Christian Brothers") local school, then the larger Irish Christian Brothers Waverley College.

He received a BS in science from the University of Sydney in 1967 and a DipEd at Sydney Teachers College in 1968.

Whilst science teaching, he returned to University of Sydney as an evening student and completed a double honours BA degree in psychology and philosophy and an MEd degree in philosophy of education. In 1972 he was appointed a lecturer in education at Teachers College, and in 1975 was appointed a lecturer in philosophy of education at the University of New South Wales. Whilst on staff at UNSW he was awarded a PhD degree (1980) with a thesis critical of Paul Hirst’s epistemology. A version of the thesis was published as a book. He also completed a MA degree (1985) from Sydney University in history and philosophy of science with a thesis on Galilean physics.

In 1980 he became the first independent alderman elected to Sydney City Council since the First War. He served two terms whilst continuing to teach at UNSW. During his tenure he served as Chair of the House Committee and wrote the local history book

From 1992 to 1993 he was foundation professor of science education at the University of Auckland, New Zealand.

He has had productive visiting appointments and sabbatical leaves at a number of universities: Boston University, Pavia University, University of Helsinki, Florida State University and Zhejiang Normal University.

== Authored books ==
Matthews, M.R.: 1980, The Marxist Theory of Schooling: A Study in Epistemology and Education, Brighton, Harvester Press. ISBN 0-85527-443-3

Matthews, M.R.: 1982, Pyrmont & Ultimo: A History, Sydney, Southwood Press.

Matthews, M.R.: 1994, Science Teaching: The Role of History and Philosophy of Science, Routledge, New York. ISBN 0-415-90282-7

______________(2007), Greek translation, Epicentre Press, Thessaloniki. ISBN 978-960-458-140-5

______________(2013), Korean translation, Ichi Science Publishers, Seoul. ISBN 978-89-5526-686-3

Matthews, M.R.: 1995, Challenging New Zealand Science Education, Dunmore Press, Palmsterston North. ISBN 0-86469-237-4

Matthews, M.R.: 2000, Time for Science Education: How Teaching the History and Philosophy of Pendulum Motion Can Contribute to Science Literacy, Plenum Press, New York

______________(2008), Greek Translation, Epicentre Press, Thessaloniki

Matthews, M.R.: 2015, Science Teaching: The Contribution of History and Philosophy of Science, Routledge, New York. ISBN 978-0-415-51933-5

______________ (2017) Chinese translation, Foreign Languages, Technical and Research Press, Beijing. ISBN 7513585725

______________(2017) Turkish translation, Boğaziçi University Press, Istanbul. ISBN 978-605-4787-87-6

______________(2017) Spanish translation, Fondo de Cultura Económica, Ciudad de México, Mexico. ISBN 978-607-16-5039-9

Matthews, M.R.: 2019, Feng Shui: Teaching About Science and Pseudoscience, Springer Dordrecht. ISBN 978-3-030-18821-4

Matthews, M.R.: 2021, History, Philosophy and Science Teaching: A Personal Story, Springer, Dordrecht.

== Edited books ==
Matthews, M.R. (ed.): 1989, The Scientific Background to Modern Philosophy, Indianapolis, Hackett Publishing Company. ISBN 0-87220-075-2

Matthews, M.R. (ed.): 1991, History, Philosophy and Science Teaching: Selected Readings, Teachers' College Press, New York. ISBN 0-7744-0353-5

Matthews, M.R. (ed.): 1998, Constructivism in Science Education: A Philosophical Examination, Kluwer Academic Publishers, Dordrecht. ISBN 0-7923-5033-2

Matthews, M.R., Bevilacqua, F. & Giannetto, E. (eds.): 2001, Science Education and Culture: The Role of History and Philosophy of Science, Kluwer, Dordrecht.

_______(2008), Greek Translation, Epicentre Press, Thessaloniki. ISBN 960-8183-20-0

Matthews, M.R., Gauld, C.F. & Stinner, A. (eds.): 2005, The Pendulum: Scientific, Historical, Philosophical and Educational Perspectives, Springer, Dordrecht.

Matthews, M.R. (ed.): 2009, Science, Worldviews and Education, Springer, Dordrecht. ISBN 978-90-481-2778-8

Matthews, M.R. (ed.): 2014, International Handbook of Research in History, Philosophy and Science Teaching (three volumes), Springer, Dordrectht. ISBN 978-94-007-7653-1

Matthews, M.R. (ed.): 2018, History, Philosophy and Science Teaching: New Perspectives, Springer, Dordrecht. ISBN 978-3-319-62614-7

Matthews, M.R. (ed.): 2019, Mario Bunge: A Centenary Festschrift, Springer, Dordrecht. ISBN 978-3-030-16672-4

== Other publications ==
Matthews has authored over 50 book and handbook chapters, and encyclopedia entries. And 60 journal articles in science education, philosophy of education, and history and philosophy of science.

== Journal editorship ==
Matthews was Foundation Editor of the Springer journal Science & Education: Contributions of History and Philosophy of Science (1992-2014), the first journal devoted to research in the field of HPS and science teaching.

== Awards ==
In 2007 Matthews became president of the Teaching Commission of the Division of History of Science and Technology (DHST) of the International Union of the History and Philosophy of Science (IUHPS). In 2011 the Division of the Logic, Methodology and Philosophy of Science (DLMPS) of the IUHPS joined with the DHST to create a joint Teaching Commission, of which Matthews was the founding president.

In 2010 he was awarded the ‘Joseph H. Hazen Education Prize for Excellence in Education’ by US History of Science Society.

In 2015 the International History, Philosophy and Science Teaching Group initiated a ‘Distinguished Achievement Award’ Matthews was honoured to be its first recipient.

In 2019 he was elected a Fellow of the Royal Society of New South Wales (FRSN) for contributions to international HPS&ST research.
