= Luopan =

Chinese compass used in feng shui

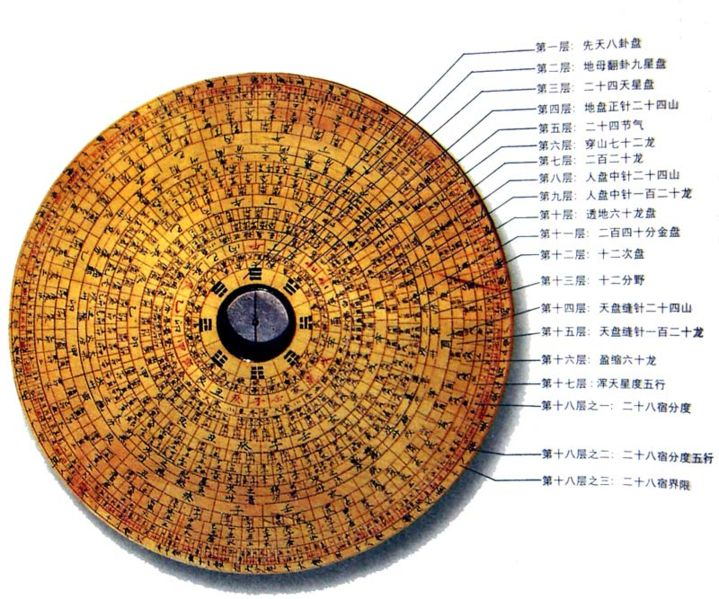
- Luopan
- Traditional Chinese: 羅盤
- Simplified Chinese: 罗盘
Transcriptions
Standard Mandarin
- Hanyu Pinyin: luópán
Wu
- Romanization: lu boe
Yue: Cantonese
- Jyutping: lo^{4} pun^{4*2}
Southern Min
- Hokkien POJ: lô-pôaⁿ

The luopan or geomantic compass is a Chinese magnetic compass, also known as a feng shui compass. It is used by a feng shui practitioner to determine the precise direction of a structure, place or item. A luopan contains information and formulas regarding its functions. The needle points towards the south magnetic pole.

== Form and function ==
Like a conventional compass, a luopan is a direction finder. However, a luopan differs from a compass in several important ways. The most obvious difference is the feng shui formulas embedded in up to 40 concentric rings on the surface. This is a metal or wooden plate known as the heaven dial. The circular metal or wooden plate typically sits on a wooden base known as the earth plate. The heaven dial rotates freely on the earth plate.

A red wire or thread that crosses the earth plate and heaven dial at 90-degree angles is the Heaven Center Cross Line, or Red Cross Grid Line. This line is used to find the direction and note position on the rings.

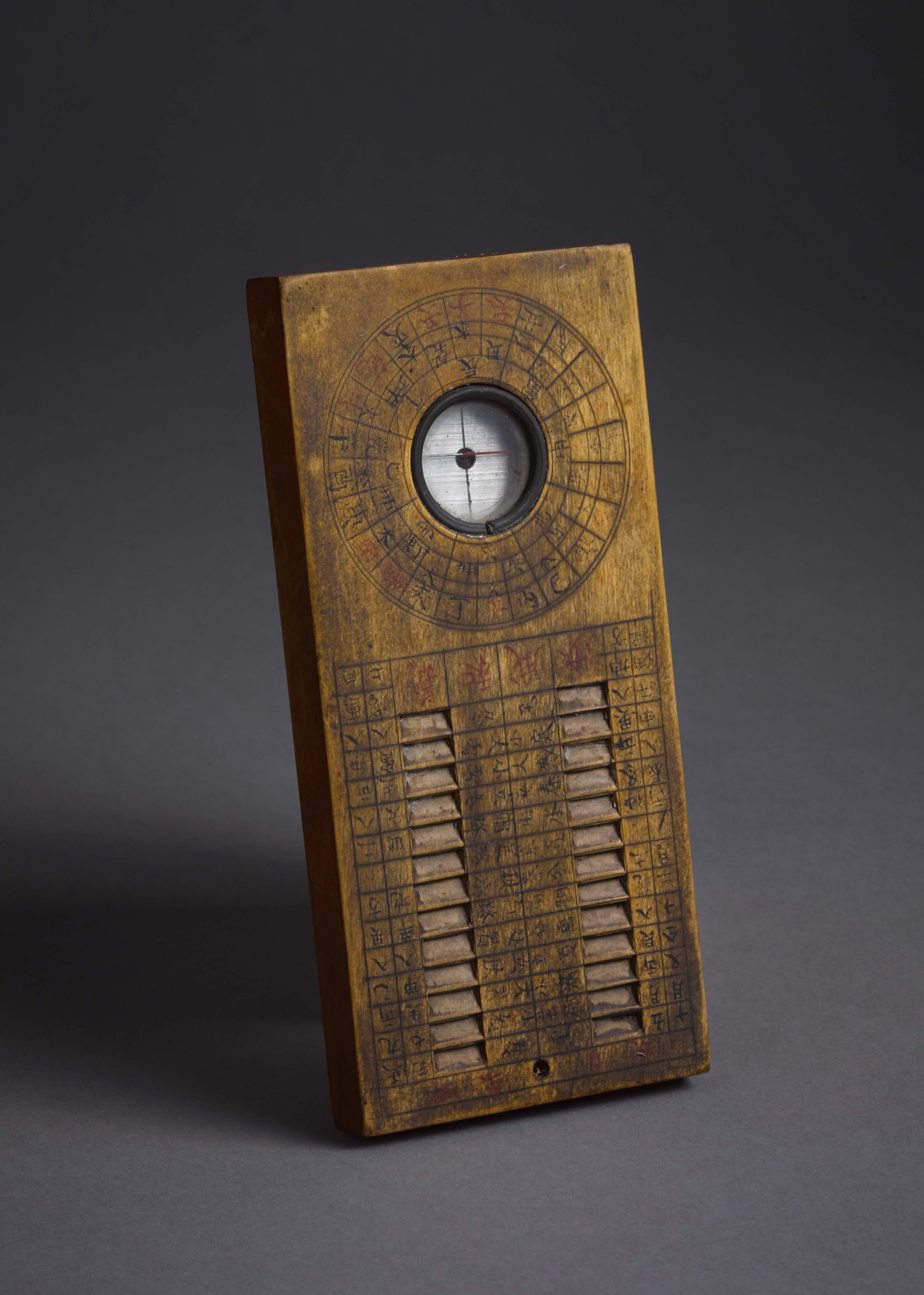
Small feng shui compass, c. 1800–1894, from the Oxford College Archives of Emory University.

A conventional compass has markings for four or eight directions, while a luopan typically contains markings for 24 directions. This translates to 15 degrees per direction. The Sun takes approximately 15.2 days to traverse a solar term, a series of 24 points on the ecliptic. Since there are 360 degrees on the luopan and approximately 365.25 days in a mean solar year, each degree on a luopan approximates a terrestrial day.

Unlike a typical compass, a luopan does not point to the north magnetic pole of Earth. The needle of a luopan points to the south magnetic pole (it does not point to the geographic South Pole). The Chinese word for compass, 指南針 (zhǐnánzhēn in Mandarin), translates to “south-pointing needle.”

== Types ==
Since the Ming and Qing dynasties, three types of luopan have been popular. They have some formula rings in common, such as the 24 directions and the early and later heaven arrangements.

=== San He ===
This luopan was said to have been used in the Tang dynasty. The San He contains three basic 24-direction rings. Each ring relates to a different method and formula. (The techniques grouped under the name "Three Harmonies" are the San He methods.)

=== San Yuan ===
This luopan, also known as the jiang pan (after Jiang Da Hong) or the Yi Pan (because of the presence of Yijing hexagrams) incorporates many formulas used in San Yuan (Three Cycles). It contains one 24-direction ring, known as the Earth Plate Correct Needle, the ring for the 64 hexagrams, and others. (The techniques grouped under the name "Flying Stars" are an example of San Yuan methods.)

=== Zong He ===
This luopan combines rings from the San He and San Yuan. It contains three 24-direction-rings and the 64 trigrams ring.

=== Other types ===
Each feng shui master may design a luopan to suit preference and to offer students. Some designs incorporate the bagua (trigram) numbers, directions from the Eight Mansions (八宅; bāzhái) methods, and English equivalents.

== History and development ==
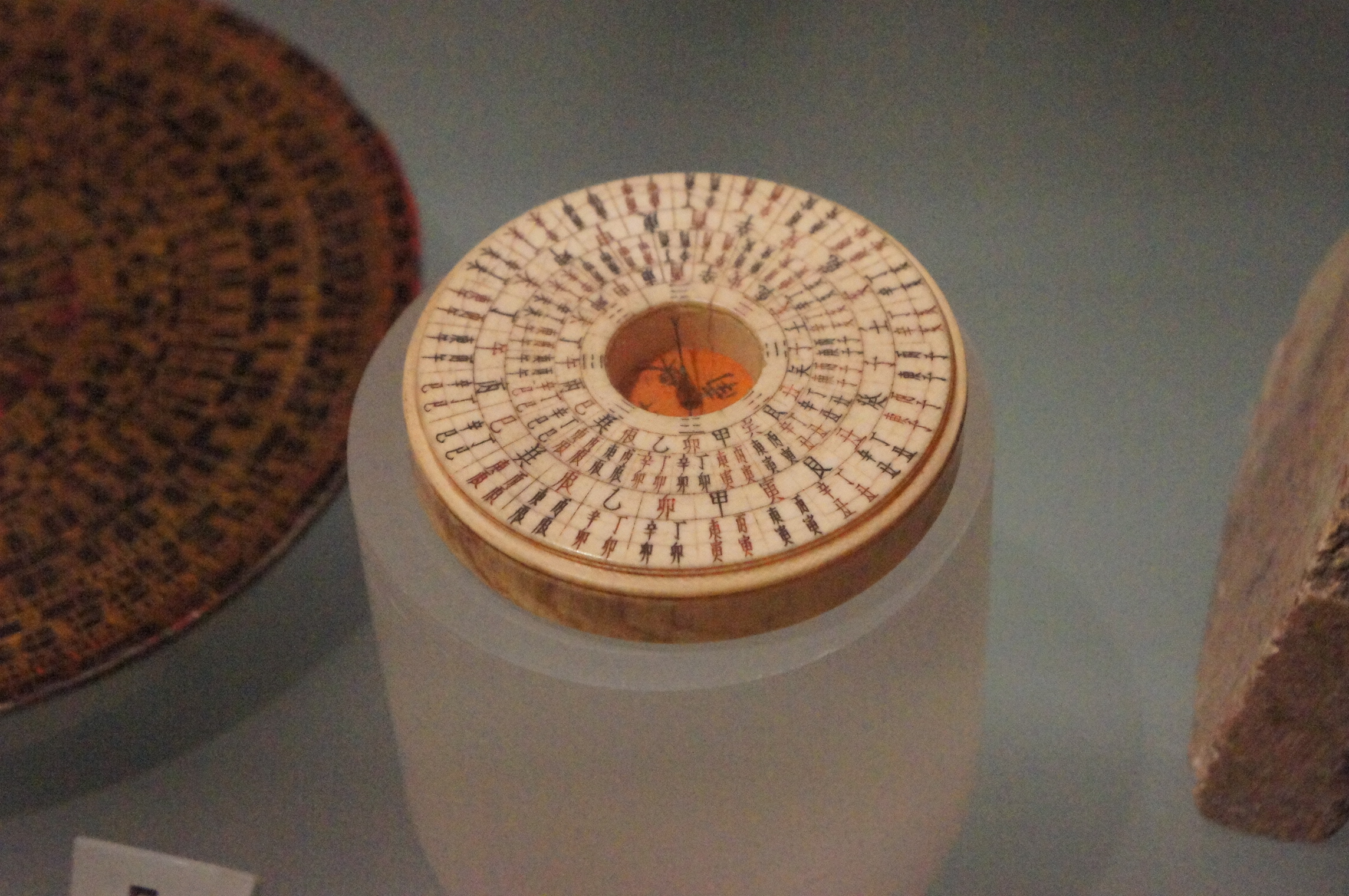
Chinese geomantic compass c. 1760 from the National Maritime Museum in London

The luopan is an image of the cosmos (a world model) based on tortoise plastrons used in divination. At its most basic level it serves as a means to assign proper positions in time and space, like the Ming Tang (Hall of Light). The markings are similar to those on a liubo board.

The oldest precursors of the luopan are the 式; shì or 式盤; shìpán, meaning astrolabe or diviner's board—also sometimes called liuren astrolabes—unearthed from tombs that date between 278 BCE and 209 BCE. These astrolabes consist of a lacquered, two-sided board with astronomical sightlines. Along with divination for Da Liu Ren, the boards were commonly used to chart the motion of Taiyi through the nine palaces. The markings are virtually unchanged from the shi to the first magnetic compasses. The schematic of earth plate, heaven plate, and grid lines is part of the "two cords and four hooks" (二繩四鉤; èrshéngsìgōu) geometrical diagram in use since at least the Warring States period. The zhinan zhen or south-pointing needle, is the original magnetic compass, and was developed for feng shui. It featured the two cords and four hooks diagram, direction markers, and a magnetized spoon in the center.

== See also ==
- Automatic writing
- Chu Silk Manuscript
- Dowsing
- Geomancy

== Bibliography ==
- Cheng, Jian Jun; Fernandes-Gonçalves, Adriana (1998). Chinese Feng Shui Compass: Step by Step Guide. Nanchang, Jianxi: Jianxi Science and Technology Publishing House. ISBN 9787539014302.
- Campbell, Wallace H. (2001). Earth Magnetism: A Guided Tour Through Magnetic Fields. San Diego: Academic Press. ISBN 9780121581640.
- Kalinowski, Mark; Brooks, Phyllis (1998). "The Xingde 刑德 Texts from Mawangdui". Early China. 23: 125–202. doi:10.1017/S0362502800000973. S2CID 163626838.
- Yin, Difei (1978). "Xi-Han Ruyinhou de zhanpan he tianwen yiqi" 西漢汝陰侯的占盤和天文儀器 [Western Han Lord of Runyin's divining plate and astrological apparatus]. Kaogu. 5: 338–343. ISSN 0453-2899.
- Yan, Dunjie (1978). "Guanyu Xi-Han chuqi de shipan he zhanpan" 關於西漢初期的式盤和占盤 [Regarding Western Han's early shìpán and divining plates]. Kaogu. 5: 334–37. ISSN 0453-2899.
- Lewis, Mark Edward (2006). The Construction of Space in Early China. SUNY series in Chinese philosophy and culture. Albany, NY: State University of New York Press.
- Allan, Sarah (1991). "The shape of the cosmos". The Shape of the Turtle: Myth, Art, and Cosmos in Early China. SUNY series in Chinese philosophy and culture. Albany, NY: State University of New York Press.
