= Tieban shenshu =

Chinese form of divination

Tie Ban Shen Shu (simplified Chinese: 铁板神数; traditional Chinese: 鐵板神數; pinyin: Tiě Bǎn Shén Shù; trans. "iron plate spiritual numerology") is an ancient form of divination from China, which is still in use in mainland China, Taiwan, Singapore and the Chinese diaspora in Southeast Asia. Tie ban shen shu is regarded as among the most accurate and most difficult methods of personal fortune divination. Tie Ban is as well regarded as the collective Three Arts or Three Styles (三式 sān shì), Qi Men Dun Jia, Da Liu Ren and Tai Yi Shen Shu, China's highest metaphysical arts.

== History ==
Tie Ban Shen Shu is associated with Shao Yong, the metaphysician of the Northern Song dynasty, as he is often credited as author of the 12,000 lines of texts used in Tie Ban Shen Shu divination. Those texts were regarded highly enough by Qing dynasty scholars as to have been included in the Qing dynasty archive, the Four Treasures Siku Quanshu 四库全书 collection.

Chinese legend holds that at any one time, there are only five people in the world who have mastered the art of Tie Ban Shen Shu. If a new master of Tie Ban happens along, this means that an older one has already passed on.

Chinese legend also holds that learning Tie Ban is problematic, as the literary sources are deliberately obscured to prevent novices from easily gaining this precious knowledge.

== Technique ==
Tie Ban Shen Shu contains 12,000 individual texts, which are applied to each individual divination, through a series of twelve different procedures. The procedures for arriving at the correct texts are based on the Four Pillars (Ba Zi), which include the ten Heavenly Stems and twelve Earth Branches, numerology, the 64 hexagrams of the I Ching and the Six Familial Relationships of Chinese metaphysics. Tie Ban's emphasis on the specific quarter-hour (fifteen-minute segment) of birth ensures the relatively high degree of accuracy, in comparison with other divination methods. When the time of birth was not recorded, it could be calculated based on information from the parents, siblings and life experience, down to the quarter-hour period.

For example, text number 3253 states, "Of ten siblings, nine of them will be aristocrats."

The different texts are accumulated through the various calculation methods, and then combined to make a complete reading which covers the lifetime of an individual.

== See also ==
- Chinese astrology
- Chinese astronomy
- Chinese classical texts
- Da Liu Ren
- Feng shui
- Hexagrams
- I Ching & I Ching divination
- Jiaobei & Poe divination
- Kau Cim
- Kimon Tonkou – Japanese name for Qi Men Dun Jia.
- Shaobing Song
- Siku Quanshu
- Tai Yi Shen Shu
- Tui bei tu
- Tung Shing

== Literature ==
- "Tie ban shen shu yu ce xue", by Jian Quan, published by Zhong Guo Guo Ji Guang Bo Yin Xiang Chu Ban she, 2006 ISBN 7-89994-529-1/C51.03
- source documents from the Qing Imperial Archive, the Siku Quanshu (四库全书) or Four Treasures collection.
- "Tie Ban Shen Shu Explained" by Jack Sweeney 2009
