= Taiyi shenshu =

Form of Chinese divination

- Traditional Chinese: 太乙神數
- Simplified Chinese: 太乙神数
Transcriptions
Standard Mandarin
- Hanyu Pinyin: tàiyǐshénshù

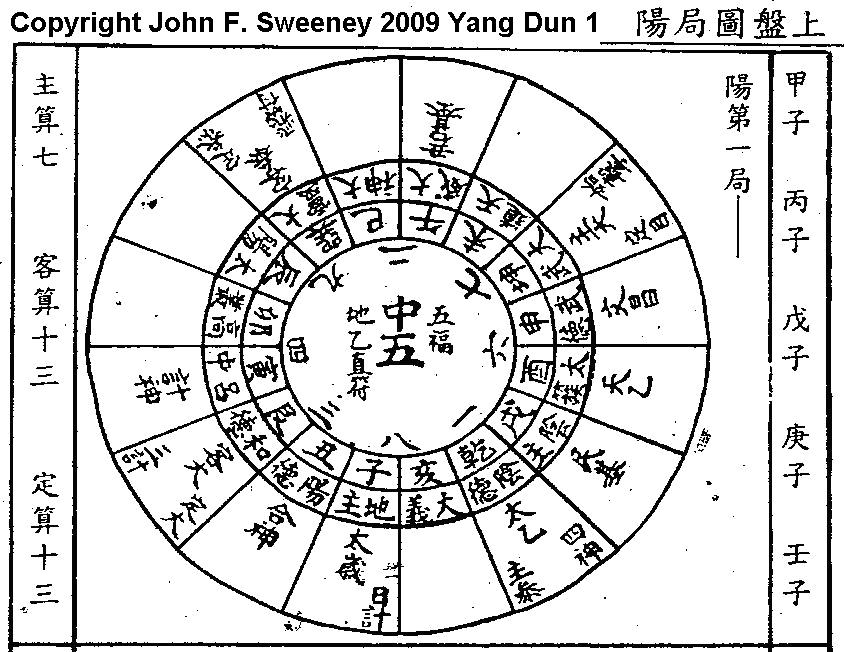
A rendering of the position of the symbols and counts of No. 1 Yang Dun array for Tai Yi divination. The entire series consists of 72 Yang Dun and 72 Yin Dun arrays for Taiyi

Taiyishenshu is a form of divination originating in China. It is one of the Three Styles (三式; sānshì; 'three styles') of divination. The others are Da Liu Ren and Qi Men Dun Jia. The system takes its name from Taiyi (太乙, "Supreme Unity"), the celestial deity whose movement among the palaces of the cosmic board governs the method.

Taiyishenshu was applied to matters of state, such as the prospects of military campaigns and the interpretation of unusual celestial phenomena; one form developed over the centuries was also used to predict personal fortunes. Numerous examples of its use appear in classical Chinese literature, especially in the dynastic histories. The historian of science Ho Peng Yoke notes that the Taiyi method described in medieval sources displays the same essential features as the technique current under the Tang and Song.

== Method ==
The methodology is similar to the other Three Styles, with a rotating heavenly plate and a fixed earthly plate, and draws on the eight trigrams and the sixty-four hexagrams as a foundation. Analysis is conducted from the Taiyi cosmic board and the array of symbols found thereon, with special reference to the position of symbols in specific palaces.

Spirits rotate around the sixteen palaces of the Taiyi cosmic board. Seventy-two cosmic boards apply to the Yin Dun period of each year, and seventy-two to the Yang Dun period; the spirits land in different palaces with each configuration of the board. Each board contains "counts" or numbers, of which the Host Count and the Guest Count take primary importance over the Fixed Count.

== See also ==
- Chinese astrology
- Chinese astronomy
- Chinese classical texts
- Classical Chinese literature
- Da Liu Ren
- Feng shui
- Hexagrams
- I Ching & I Ching divination
- Jiaobei & Poe divination
- Kau Cim
- Qi Men Dun Jia
- Shaobing Song
- Complete Library of the Four Treasuries
- Tie Ban Shen Shu
- Tui bei tu
- Tung Shing
