= Daliuren =

Chinese calendrical astrology

- Chinese: 大六壬
- Literal meaning: Great Six Ren
Transcriptions
Standard Mandarin
- Hanyu Pinyin: dàliùrén

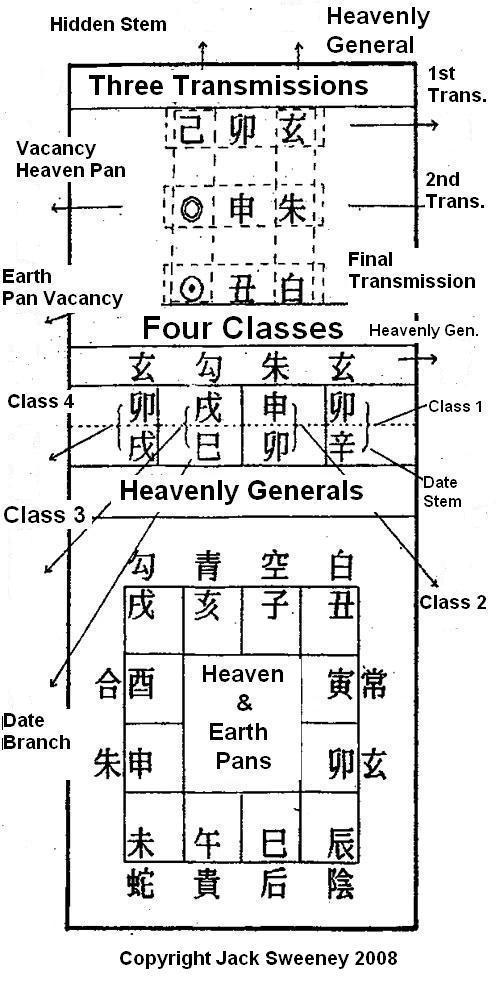
The Da Liu Ren array, with the Three Transmissions on top, the Four Classes, their Heaven and Earth pan positions, the twelve generals, and the Heaven Pan superimposed above the Earth pan. Vacancies are noted in the right margin, along with the Date and the Ju number.

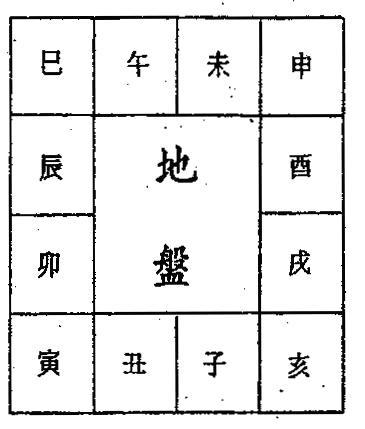
The fixed, unmoving Earth Pan positions of the twelve Earth Branches. The Heaven Pan sprits rotate around the Earth pan.

Da Liu Ren is a form of Chinese calendrical astrology dating from the later Warring States period. It is also a member of the Three Styles (三式; sānshì; 'three rites') of divination, along with Qi Men Dun Jia (奇門遁甲) and Taiyi (太乙).

Li Yang describes Da Liu Ren as the highest form of divination in China. This divination form is called Da Liu Ren because the heavenly stem rén (壬), indicating "yang water", appears six times in the Sexagenary cycle. In order, it appears in rénshēn (壬申), rénwǔ (壬午), rénchén (壬辰), rényín (壬寅), rénzǐ (壬子), and rénxū (壬戌).

== Instrument ==
The diviner's board (shi) used for the Three Styles differ markedly. The Qi Men Dun Jia divinor's board consists of a 3 × 3 magic square, while the Tai Yi board is somewhat larger, and may be drawn as either a square or circle. The Da Liu Ren cosmic board contains positions for the Earth pan and Heaven pan, which hold the twelve Earthly Branches and the twelve spirits. In addition, the Da Liu Ren cosmic board indicates the Three Transmissions (三傳; sānchuán) and Four Classes (四課; sìkè).

A shi (also known as a liuren astrolabe) from the Six Dynasties period (222–589 CE) consists of a Heaven Plate (天盤) placed over an Earth Plate (地盤). On the Earth Plate are three groups of inscriptions:

- Outer band: 36 animals (12 associated with the earthly branches, plus the 28 animals associated with the xiù or lunar mansions)
- Middle band: 28 xiù lunar mansions
- Inner ring: Stems and Branches (ganzhi).

The square plate is divided diagonally into four sections that allocate 9 animals, 7 xiu, and 5 ganzhi to a section. A diviner examined current sky phenomena to set the board and adjust their position in relation to the board.

A modern version of the Da Liu Ren cosmic board places the Three Transmissions at the top of the board, along with the corresponding Earth Branch and any pertinent vacancies. The Four Classes are placed below the Three Transmissions, with the Heaven Pan and Earth Pan positions clearly indicated below the corresponding spirit position. A diagram of the Heaven Pan positions of the twelve generals and their corresponding Earth Branch positions in the Heaven Pan completes the illustration. The Earth pan is not depicted. The sexagenary cycle date is given in the upper right–hand margin, with the corresponding situation (局; jú) number, the location of pertinent vacancies, and an indication of whether the array belongs to daytime or evening divination. The structured situation types for each array are provided in the left-hand margin. In some versions, an annotated description of the major aspects of each situation is provided. The description is often taken from the body of classical literature about Da Liu Ren.

== Technique ==
Divination in Da Liu Ren is determined by relationships of five elements (五行; wu xing) and yin and yang (陰陽) between and among the Three Transmissions, Four Classes, Twelve Generals, and the Heaven and Earth Plates. Each double-hour of the day contains a cosmic board for daytime and evening divination. The Three Transmissions are derived from configurations of the Heavenly Stem and Earthly Branch of the date. The Four Classes are determined in a similar manner.

Qi Men Dun Jia was widely used in China during the Tang and Song dynasties. By the time of the Yuan dynasty, Da Liu Ren had become the more prominent of the two in the divinatory literature. As is true with Qi Men Dun Jia, Da Liu Ren was first used in China for the purposes of devising military strategy and later developed into a more popular and widespread form of divination which grew to include medical divination, matchmaking, childbirth, travel, criminology, and weather forecasting.

In view of its complex nature, Da Liu Ren was regarded as the highest of the Three Styles, since mastery of its rule structure required many years of memorization. The extant historical literature on Da Liu Ren is extensive, surpassing that of Qi Men Dun Jia.

== See also ==
- Chinese astrology
- Chinese astronomy
- Chinese Classical Texts
- Feng Shui
- Flying Star Feng Shui
- I Ching & I Ching divination
- Jiaobei & Poe divination
- Kau Cim
- Qi Men Dun Jia
- Shaobing Song
- Siku Quanshu
- Tai Yi Shen Shu
- Tui bei tu
- Tung Shing
