= Qimen Dunjia =

Ancient Chinese cosmological divination system

- Traditional Chinese: 奇門遁甲
- Simplified Chinese: 奇门遁甲
- Literal meaning: Mysterious gates, hidden Jia
Transcriptions
Standard Mandarin
- Hanyu Pinyin: qíméndùnjiǎ

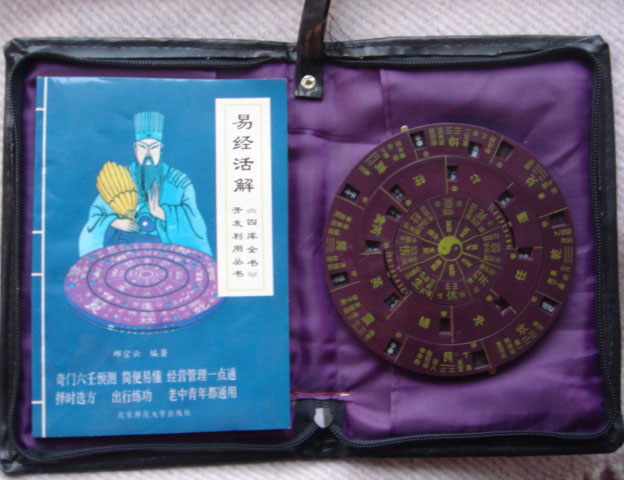
A modern Qimen Dunjia luopan

Qimen Dunjia (simplified Chinese: 奇门遁甲; traditional Chinese: 奇門遁甲; pinyin: qíméndùnjiǎ; lit. 'mysterious gates', 'hidden Jia') is an ancient Chinese divination and cosmological calculation system. It is one of the Three Styles (三式; sānshì; 'three methods') of Chinese divinatory arts, alongside Da Liu Ren and Tai Yi Shen Shu. Originally developed in the context of military strategy and statecraft, the system integrates principles from the Yijing (Book of Changes), yinyang cosmology, the Five Phases, the Heavenly Stems and Earthly Branches, and astronomical observation into a structured analytical framework. Qimen Dunjia remains in active use in mainland China, Taiwan, Hong Kong, Singapore, Malaysia, and among the Chinese diaspora in Southeast Asia.

== Etymology ==
The name Qimen Dunjia is composed of three elements. Qi (奇) refers to the three "wonderful" or "extraordinary" stems (乙 yǐ, 丙 bǐng, 丁 dīng) among the ten Heavenly Stems, which play a special role in the system's calculations. Men (門) refers to the eight "gates" (八門, bāmén) that form one of the system's analytical layers. Dunjia (遁甲) literally means "hidden Jia" or "concealed Jia", referring to the stem 甲 (jiǎ), which in the system is considered the commander or chief element and is symbolically concealed among the other stems during calculation. The name thus encapsulates the system's core mechanism: the interplay of extraordinary stems, gates, and the hidden position of the principal stem within a cosmological matrix.

== History ==
=== Origins and early development ===
The origins of Qimen Dunjia are obscured by legend and hagiography. Traditional accounts attribute the system's creation to the Yellow Emperor (黃帝, Huángdì) or to the mythical sage Jiutian Xuannü (九天玄女, the Mysterious Lady of the Nine Heavens), who is said to have transmitted the method to aid in military campaigns against the rebel Chi You. These origin narratives, while not historically verifiable, reflect the system's longstanding association with military strategy and statecraft in Chinese cultural memory.

More reliably, elements of the cosmological framework underlying Qimen Dunjia can be traced to the Warring States period (475–221 BCE) and the Han dynasty (206 BCE – 220 CE), when correlative cosmology — the systematic mapping of correspondences between celestial phenomena, temporal cycles, and terrestrial events — became a central feature of Chinese intellectual culture. The Huainanzi (c. 139 BCE) and other Han-era texts describe cosmological models involving the Heavenly Stems and Earthly Branches, directional correlations, and cyclical time calculations that form the conceptual basis for later Qimen Dunjia practice.

=== Military applications ===
Qimen Dunjia has been closely associated with military strategy throughout its history. The system's structure — which maps spatial, temporal, and cosmological variables onto a grid that can be read to determine advantageous positions, timing, and directions — lent itself to battlefield applications. Traditional Chinese historical and literary sources attribute the use of Qimen Dunjia or related methods to several prominent military figures, including Zhuge Liang (181–234 CE), the celebrated strategist of the Three Kingdoms period, who is credited in popular tradition with employing the baguazhen (八卦陣, "Eight Trigrams formation"), a tactical arrangement said to derive from Qimen Dunjia principles.

The strategist and polymath Liu Bowen (Liu Ji, 1311–1375) is traditionally credited with applying Qimen Dunjia in his military counsel to Zhu Yuanzhang, the founder of the Ming dynasty. While such attributions blend historical fact with legend, they illustrate the persistent cultural association between Qimen Dunjia and strategic decision-making at the highest levels of Chinese governance.

=== Imperial court usage ===
During the Ming (1368–1644) and Qing (1644–1912) dynasties, Qimen Dunjia was among the divinatory and cosmological systems maintained by the Qintianjian (欽天監, Imperial Astronomical Bureau), the state body responsible for astronomical observation, calendar production, and divination on behalf of the emperor. Certain Qimen Dunjia texts were reportedly classified and their use restricted to court officials, reflecting the system's perceived strategic value. The restriction of advanced divinatory texts was part of a broader pattern in which the Chinese imperial court sought to maintain control over cosmological knowledge that could be used to challenge or undermine the ruling dynasty's claim to the Mandate of Heaven.

=== Modern period ===
Following the fall of the Qing dynasty in 1912 and subsequent modernisation campaigns — particularly during the New Culture Movement and later under the People's Republic of China — Qimen Dunjia, along with other traditional divinatory practices, was officially characterised as superstition (迷信, míxìn) and discouraged. However, the practice survived in popular usage and experienced a significant revival from the late 20th century onward, particularly in Taiwan, Hong Kong, Singapore, and Malaysia, where it has been adapted for contemporary applications including business strategy, financial planning, and personal consultation.

== Structure and technique ==
=== The cosmic board ===
The Qimen Dunjia system is structured around a cosmic board (式盤; shìpán) consisting of a 3 × 3 magic square of nine palaces (九宮; jiǔgōng), corresponding to the eight directional sectors of the bagua (eight trigrams) plus a central palace. Layered onto this nine-palace grid are several interacting plates or layers of information:

- Heaven plate (天盤, tiānpán) — carries the nine stars (九星, jiǔxīng), which rotate through the palaces according to temporal cycles
- Earth plate (地盤, dìpán) — the fixed base representing the spatial ground of the situation
- Spirit plate (神盤, shénpán) — carries eight spirits or deities (八神, bāshén) that rotate through the palaces
- Eight gates (八門, bāmén) — eight symbolic gates (Open, Rest, Life, Harm, Block, Scenery, Death, Shock) positioned on the board, each carrying specific divinatory meanings

The various symbolic elements rotate through the nine palaces according to the time of the divination, based on the sexagenary (sixty-unit) cycle of Heavenly Stems and Earthly Branches. This rotation produces 1,080 distinct configurations (局, jú, "situations"), which are cycled four times per year and divided between the yin and yang halves of the annual cycle.

=== Casting a chart ===
A Qimen Dunjia chart is cast for a specific moment in time, typically the moment a question is posed to the diviner. The analyst determines which of the 1,080 configurations corresponds to that moment by reference to the Chinese calendar, the solar terms (二十四節氣), and the sexagenary cycle. The resulting chart displays the arrangement of stars, gates, spirits, and stems across the nine palaces for that specific temporal moment.

Each type of Qimen Dunjia divination employs a specific set of "use spirits" (用神; yòngshén), which are the primary symbolic elements the analyst focuses on when interpreting the chart. For example, medical divination relies principally on the star plate, while questions about travel or conflict may focus on the gates and spirits. The analyst interprets the relationships between the various layers — including whether elements are in supporting or conflicting positions according to Five Phase theory — to respond to the question at hand.

=== Relationship to other systems ===
Qimen Dunjia shares its cosmological foundations with the other two of the Three Styles: Da Liu Ren and Tai Yi Shen Shu. All three systems employ the Heavenly Stems, Earthly Branches, and correlative cosmology, but differ in their specific structures and applications. Da Liu Ren is oriented toward answering specific personal questions, Tai Yi Shen Shu toward large-scale prognostication about states and dynasties, and Qimen Dunjia toward strategic and situational analysis.

Qimen Dunjia also shares conceptual ground with feng shui, particularly the Compass school tradition and Flying Star Feng Shui, both of which employ the luopan compass and map cosmological cycles onto spatial configurations. However, whereas feng shui is primarily concerned with the assessment of fixed environments, Qimen Dunjia is time-centred and oriented toward the analysis of specific moments and situations.

== Cultural significance ==
Qimen Dunjia occupies a distinctive place in Chinese cultural history as a system that bridges divination, military science, and cosmological philosophy. Its association with legendary strategists such as Zhuge Liang and Liu Bowen has made it a recurring motif in Chinese wuxia and historical fiction. The baguazhen tactical formation attributed to Qimen Dunjia principles appears in the classical novel Romance of the Three Kingdoms and has entered Chinese popular culture as a symbol of strategic genius.

In modern practice, Qimen Dunjia has expanded beyond its traditional military and governmental applications to encompass personal consultation, business strategy, and financial decision-making, particularly in the Chinese-speaking communities of Southeast Asia.

== Academic research ==
In the European academic context, the Qimen Dunjia system has been addressed in specialized studies such as the doctoral dissertation by Alejandro Peñataro Sánchez, submitted at the Free University of Berlin, which analyzes the system from a historical and cognitive perspective within the context of divination practices in imperial China.

== See also ==
- Chinese astrology
- Chinese astronomy
- Chinese classical texts
- Da Liu Ren
- Feng shui
- Flying Star Feng Shui
- Four Pillars of Destiny
- Hypernumbers
- I Ching and I Ching divination
- Wen Wang Gua
- Jiaobei and Poe divination
- Kau Cim
- Jiutian Xuannü
- Luopan
- Shaobing Song
- Tai Yi Shen Shu
- Tie Ban Shen Shu
- Tui bei tu
- Tung Shing
- Yuan Hai Zi Ping
- Wude Zhongshi Shuo

== Sources ==
- Bruun, Ole (2003). Fengshui in China: Geomantic Divination Between State Orthodoxy and Popular Religion. University of Hawaiʻi Press. ISBN 0-8248-2757-0.
- Elman, Benjamin A. (2005). On Their Own Terms: Science in China, 1550–1900. Harvard University Press. ISBN 978-0-674-01685-9.
- Ho, Peng Yoke (2003). Chinese Mathematical Astrology: Reaching Out to the Stars. Routledge. ISBN 978-0-415-86310-0.
- Kalinowski, Marc (2010). "Divination and Astrology: Received Texts and Excavated Manuscripts". In Lagerwey, John; Kalinowski, Marc (eds.). Early Chinese Religion, Part One: Shang through Han (1250 BC–220 AD). Brill. pp. 339–396. ISBN 978-90-04-16835-0.
- Mak, Michael Y.; So, Albert T. (2015). Scientific Feng Shui for the Built Environment: Theories and Applications. City University of Hong Kong Press. ISBN 978-962-937-253-8.
- Skinner, Stephen (2008). Guide to the Feng Shui Compass: A Compendium of Classical Feng Shui. Golden Hoard Press. ISBN 978-0-9547639-0-9.
