= Shao bing (disambiguation) =

Shao bing, or shaobing, is a type of Chinese baked pastry.

Shao bing may also refer to:

- Naan, also known as "shao bing" in China, type of Asian bread commonly eaten in West, Central and South Asia
- Shao Bing (born 1968), Chinese actor

== See also ==
- Shaobing Song
