= Spirit writing in China =

Method of planchette writing originated in China

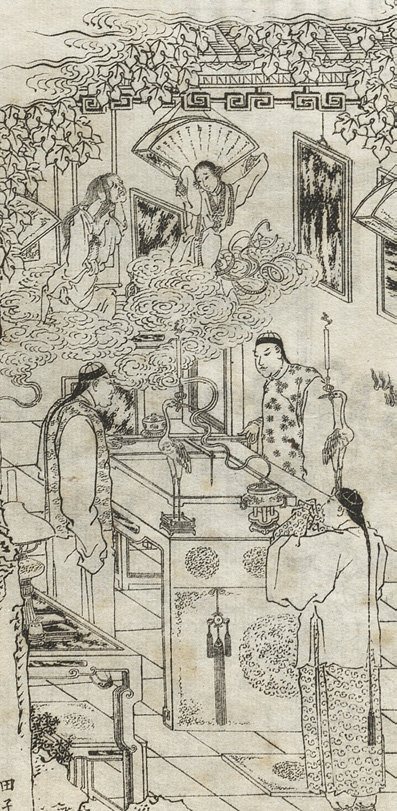
Lithography called Feiluan Xinyu in the magazine Dianshizhai Pictorial (1884–1898). It represents the technique of fuji during the Qing dynasty, also called "descending of the phoenix" (feiluan), with the pencil being held by two mediums over a sand tray, in which characters allegedly directed by the spirits (in the cloud above) are written.

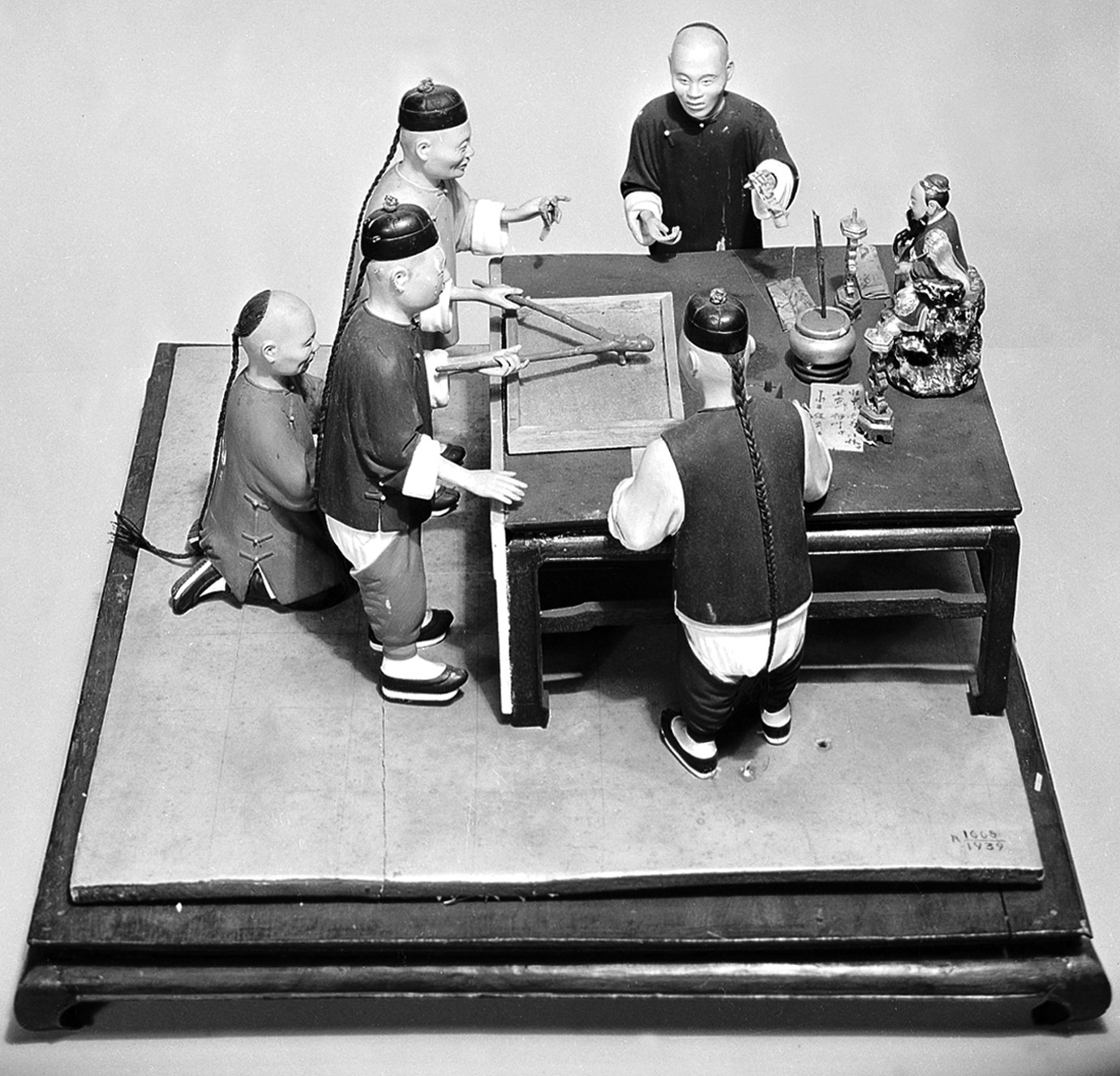
A model of fuji practitioners in front of a fuji altar

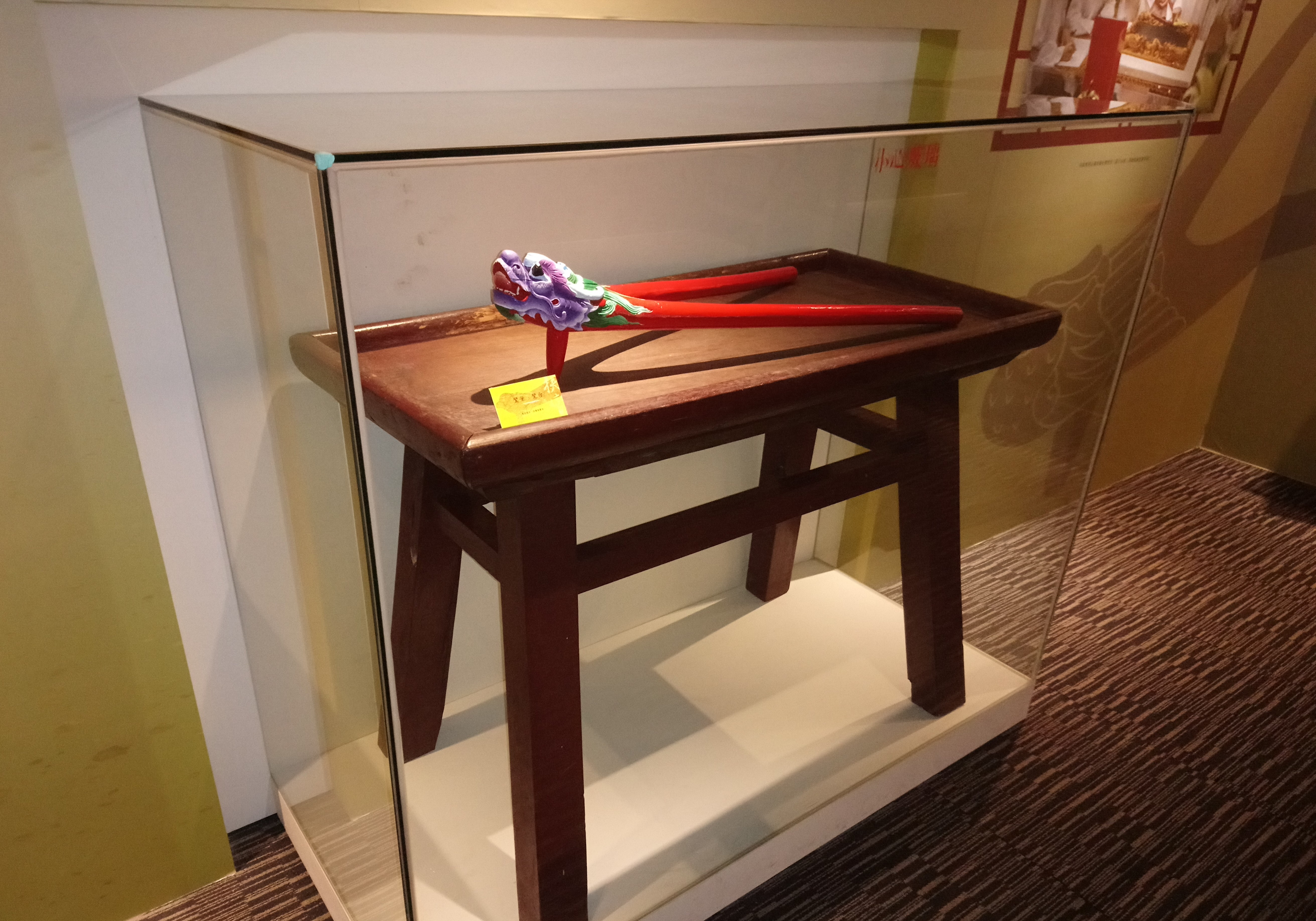
Fuji pen and table at Lanyang Museum, in Yilan County, Taiwan.

Spirit writing, also referred to as fuji (Chinese: 扶乩; pinyin: fújī or 扶箕) or as planchette writing, is a religious practice in Chinese religions where messages from deities, ancestors, or spirits, are conveyed through a wooden or metal stylus guided by a medium or a group of participants. Fuji is a form of automatic writing that often uses a suspended sieve or tray called a planchette, which is filled with sand or incense ash where characters are written using a pen or stylus. The practice is documented as early as the Song dynasty, and serves as a method for connecting individuals or communities assembled at an altar with a particular deity. This practice aims to fulfill personal requests, promote healing, provide moral guidance on individual or societal matters, and, in some cases, assist in the pursuit of loftier spiritual goals.

During the fuji session, the deity communicates by descending into a medium's body and dictating responses—ranging from brief messages to extensive scriptures—using various writing utensils on paper, sand, or ashes. When inscribing on sand, attendants read the words aloud and transcribe them. Occasionally, the deity is said to directly manipulate the writing tool without requiring a human medium. The resulting messages are shared with individuals or the wider community. Distributing and printing these scriptures is an integral part of the practice, fostering merit and legitimacy for the community while reinforcing its connection to the deity. Spirit-writing often transcends affiliation with a single religious tradition, incorporating diverse ritual elements and divine figures.

The practice of fuji has played a significant role in Daoist, folk Chinese, and Buddhist religious contexts, each of which has shaped its functions and meanings in distinct ways. Fuji exemplifies a syncretic interplay among these traditions, serving as a medium for divine communication, moral instruction, and religious guidance. Texts written through the fuji method have become important in some Chinese religious sects. These texts usually contain moral teachings, cosmological insights, or guidance for conducting rituals. Fuji is also practiced in some Southeast Asian communities, such as in the Vietnamese new religion of Caodaoism.

== History ==
Spirit-writing has a long history in Chinese folk religion and seeking messages from the spirits is even older. Priest of Celestial Master Daoism (天師道; Tianshidao) during the late Eastern Han era sent written petitions (章; zhang) to the deities and the deities were believed to have revealed scriptures in return (though the specific techniques used for this varied).

The actual technique of fuji spirit-writing is first recorded during the Liu Song dynasty (420–479 CE). Fuji became popular during the Song dynasty (960–1279), when authors like Shen Kuo and Su Shi associated its origins with summoning the goddess Zigu (紫姑; "Purple Maiden"), the Spirit of the Latrine. She was initially invoked by groups of female devotees who often asked the goddess about silk production. Over time the practice was adopted by the elites and literati, becoming an increasingly sophisticated way to communicate with deities and ancestors. Fuji was also adopted by Daoist priests and became connected with Daoist ritual practice. Daoist priests saw it as a way to communicate with the celestial bureaucracy of Heaven.

Fuji writing also flourished during the Ming dynasty (1368–1644), where various religious groups maintained special altars or jitan (乩壇; "planchette altar") where mediums would communicate with specific deities and produce texts written through the fuji method. Usually this involved a special dual handle pen which would be used to write on sand. Fuji was quite popular with the elites by this time. The Jiajing Emperor (r. 1522–1566) built a special jitan (乩壇; "planchette altar") in the Forbidden City.

During the Qing dynasty (1644–1912), the practice continued among numerous various communities, each having their own mediums and spirit altars. As spirit-writing became central to many Chinese religions of the time, the scripture collections produced by these spirit writing groups grew exponentially during the Mind and Qing eras. Spirit writing became increasingly popular during the Qing era despite being prohibited by the Qing code.

Fuji writing is the source of several influential Chinese religious texts, such as The Secret of the Golden Flower and possibly the Xingming guizhi (性命圭旨,; "Principles of Inner Nature and Vital Force").

During the Republican Period, spirit-writing continued being popular. It was widely adopted by the various Chinese "redemptive societies" (救世團體; jiushi tuanti), also known as "Salvationist Religions", who sought to receive guidance from the gods during uncertain times. Redemptive Societies which incorporated spirit writing included the China Life Saving Society, the Society for Awakening and Goodness, and the Institution of the Dao. The rise of the publishing industry also led to a proliferation of spirit-writing books, many of which became widely distributed. Various components of the educated elites sought to rationalize the practice of spirit writing, including Lingxuehui (Shanghai Spiritualist Society).

The journal New Youth and intellectuals associated with the journal (including Chen Duxiu and Chen Daqi) criticized spirit writing and those like Lingxuehui which sought to legitimize the practice. According to academic Matthias Schumann, this was the first time that spirit writing was systematically criticized (as opposed to sporadically criticized) as "superstitious".

After this public debate, spirit writing communities including Daoyuan and Wushanshe became prominent; these organizations tied spirit writing to charitable and religious practice. They also legitimated spirit writing through contrasting it with "Western material modernity," which was increasingly criticized by Chinese intellectuals after World War I.

During the Beiyang period, established religious groups criticized spirit writing groups, in part because they were threatened by the spread of these organizations.

During the late 1920s, spirit writing organizations, much like redemptive societies of the period, modeled their organizations on civic associations of the late Qing period, writing constitutions, bylaws, and publishing their precepts and doctrines. Their writings emphasized the moral and social value of the organization, including charitable projects. Over time, the Beiyang governments accepted some of the bigger spirit writing organizations as registered religious organizations.

In 1928, the ROC government banned two of the largest redemptive societies which engaged in spirit writing, the Daoyuan and the Wushanshe.

Fuji spirit-writing is still an important part of Chinese religious life, especially among groups in Taiwan, Hong Kong, Guangdong, Malaysia, Southeast Asia, as well as folk shrines in Mainland China and in the Chinese diaspora. Spirit writing takes place in highly diverse communities, such as spirit-writing altars (乩壇; jitan, i.e. 扶乩道壇; fuji daotan), which are specifically centered around spirit-writing and a specific deity, as well as other groups, including Daotan (道壇; "Daoist altar") or Daotang (道堂; "Daoist halls"), Rutan (儒壇; "Confucian altars"), shantan and shantang (charitable altars or halls) and "vegetarian halls" (齋堂; zhaitang). These communities may also conduct other religious activities, including meditation, charity, healing, divination, scripture chanting, and listening to morality sermons.

Some non-Chinese religions have also adopted the practice, like Caodaism and Minh Đạo Vietnamese religions.

Xu Dishan was an early figure in the study of spirit writing practices and his 1941 text An Investigation into of the Superstition of Spirit Writing is a major work in the area.

== Chinese religions ==
=== Daoism ===
In Daoist religions, fuji is seen as a means of engaging with the spirit world. Daoist priests often use this technique in rituals to communicate with celestial beings, immortals, or ancestors and receive guidance on religious matters.

Throughout its history, fuji has also been a vehicle for the creation and transmission of Daoist religious texts. Many spirit-writing sessions produced scriptures that were subsequently canonized within specific traditions, particularly during the Ming and Qing dynasties. The Daozang (Daoist Canon) contains many scriptures written through spirit-writing. Examples include the Daozang jiyao (道藏輯要; "Essentials of the Daoist Canon"), a Qing era collection of Daoist texts, the Lüzu quanshu (Complete collection of Patriarch Lü), and the Wendi quanshu (Complete collection of Thearch Wen).

=== Buddhism ===
Fuji spirit writing also influenced and was influenced by Chinese Buddhism. Some Daoist fuji writings show clear Buddhist influence. Several popular Buddhist deities (like Guanyin, Maitreya and Ji Gong) became the central deities of spirit-writing altars where they were contacted by mediums. This was especially popular from the mid-nineteenth century onward. This practice led to numerous Buddhist spirit-writing texts.

Many Chinese Buddhist lay intellectuals were also deeply involved in the practice of fuji. One example is the influential literatus Peng Shaosheng (1740–1796). This continued during the Republican period with lay Buddhists like Wang Yiting 王 一亭 (1867–1938) and Ding Fubao 丁福保 (1874–1952). Both of them "participated in the religious and philanthropic activities of spirit-writing organizations." While most Buddhist monks were not as enthusiastic as laypeople when it comes to fuji, many did not totally reject the teachings found in spirit writing texts (which promoted charity and other good works), even if they did not think Buddhist deities would actually engage with people in this manner.

In contemporary spirit-writing culture, fuji halls often contain Buddhist and Daoist elements. This syncretism reflects the popular ideology of the "unity of the three teachings" (三教合一; sanjiao heyi).

=== Chinese folk religions ===
In folk religion, fuji is more decentralized, practiced in local temples or by spirit-medium associations. Unlike its formalized use in Daoism, folk practitioners often employed fuji for pragmatic purposes such as resolving personal crises, diagnosing illnesses, or seeking advice on family or business matters. Deities like Guandi (the God of War) and Mazu (the Sea Goddess) are commonly invoked. This aspect of fuji underscores its accessibility and adaptability. In this setting, fuji often reinforced local customs and strengthened community bonds.

Fuji has also been important in certain organized Chinese traditions, such as the Yiguandao movement, which integrated fuji-derived texts into their religious corpus, claiming divine origin for the moral, philosophical, or eschatological messages they contained.

== Vocabulary ==
Chinese fuji spirit-writing involves some specialized vocabulary. Luan (鸞; "a mythical phoenix-like bird") is used in synonyms such as fuluan (扶鸞; "support the phoenix"), feiluan (飛鸞; "flying phoenix"), and jiangluan (降鸞; "descending phoenix").

The fuji process involves specialized participants. The two people (or rarely one) who hold the sieve or stylus are called jishou (乩手; "planchette hands"), only one of whom is ostensibly possessed by a shen (神; "spirit; god") or xian (仙; "immortal; transcendent"). Their assistants include a pingsha (平沙; "level sand") who smooths out the shapan (沙盤; "sand table"), a dujizhe (讀乩者; "planchette reader") who interprets the characters, and a chaojizhe (抄乩者; "planchette copyist") who records them. Jiwen (乩文; "planchette writing") is a general reference to texts produced through Chinese fuji spirit-writing.

During the Ming, the terminology of fuji also developed further. For example, the term 扶箕 "support the sieve" (referring to the suspended sieve or winnowing tray where writing is done) to 扶乩 "support the planchette" (directing a stick or stylus, typically made from a willow or peach branch, and roughly resembling a dowsing-rod).

== See also ==
- Chinese fortune telling
- Chinese spiritual world concepts
- Fenghuang
- I Ching divination
- Jiaobei
- Jailangkung
- Kau chim
- Kokkuri
- Omikuji
- Ouija
- Poe divination
- Thoughtography
- Tongji – medium or oracle in Chinese folk religion
- Tung Shing – Chinese divination guide and almanac
- The Secret of the Golden Flower
