= O-mikuji =

Fortunes written on paper at shrines and temples in Japan

Omikuji (御御籤/御神籤/おみくじ) are random fortunes written on strips of paper at Shinto shrines and Buddhist temples in Japan. Literally "sacred lot", these are usually received by making a small offering and randomly choosing one from a box, hoping for the resulting fortune to be good. As of 2024, vending machines sometimes dispense omikuji.

The omikuji predicts the person's chances of their hopes coming true, of finding a good match, or generally matters of health, fortune, life, etc. When the prediction is bad, it is a custom to fold up the strip of paper and attach it to a pine tree or a wall of metal wires alongside other bad fortunes in the temple or shrine grounds. A purported reason for this custom is a pun on the word for pine tree (松, matsu) and the verb 'to wait' (待つ, matsu), the idea being that the bad luck will wait by the tree rather than attach itself to the bearer. In the event of the fortune being good, the bearer has two options: they can also tie it to the tree or wires so that the fortune has a greater effect or they can keep it for luck. Omikuji are available at many shrines and temples, and remain one of the traditional activities related to shrine or temple-going.

The term kuji itself carries a double meaning: it can refer to the use of random chance to render a verdict impartial, or to the act of consulting the divine will in matters where a kami's judgment is considered appropriate. Beyond personal fortune-telling, omikuji continue to be used today in some provincial festivals to select the person responsible (tōnin) or other religious roles for the coming year: candidates' names are written on slips of paper, and the choice is determined by a ritual strike of a gohei wand. A similar custom of writing a prayer on a specially-prepared wooden block called an ema, which is then tied to an ad hoc scaffold, also exists.

== History ==
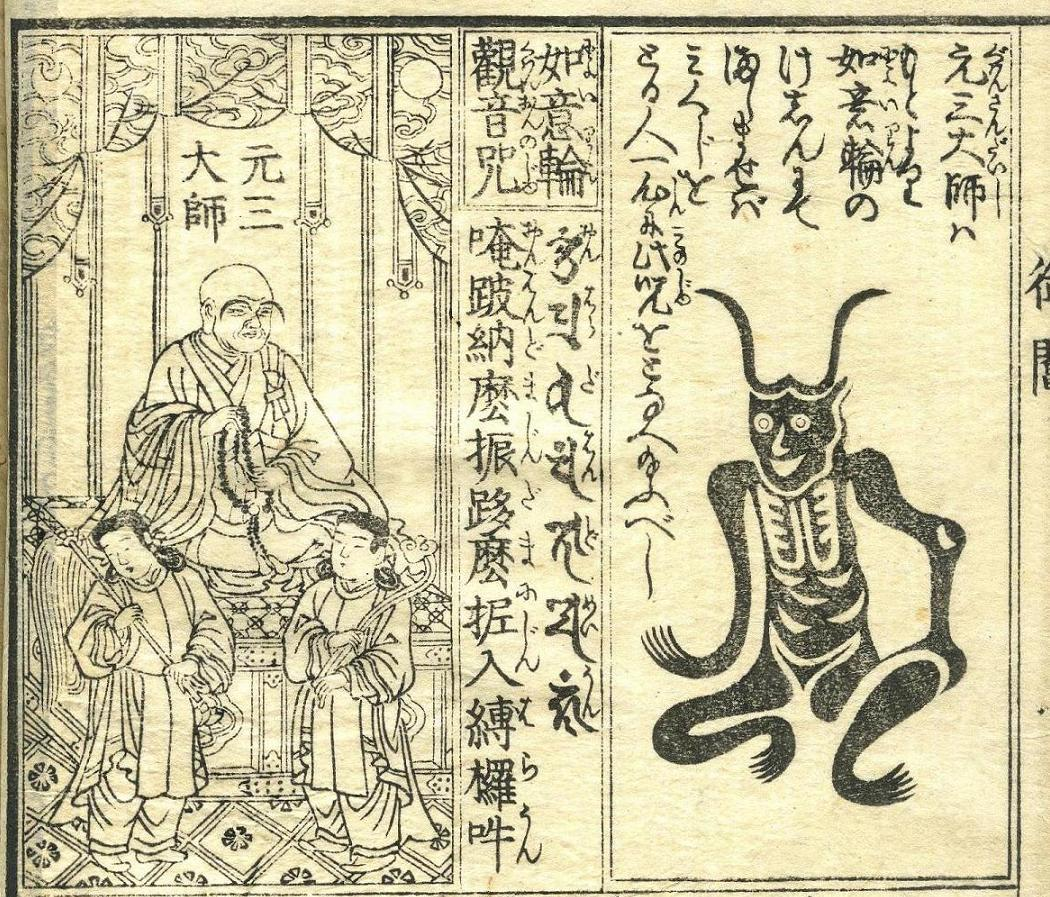
Ryōgen (left), 18th chief abbot (zasu) of Enryaku-ji

The omikuji sequence historically commonly used in Japanese Buddhist temples, consisting of one hundred prophetic five-character quatrains, is traditionally attributed to the Heian period Tendai monk Ryōgen (912–985), posthumously known as Jie Daishi (慈恵大師) or more popularly, Ganzan Daishi (元三大師), and is thus called Ganzan Daishi Hyakusen (元三大師百籤, lit. 'Ganzan Daishi's One Hundred Lots') or the Kannon Hyakusen (観音百籤, "Avalokiteśvara's One Hundred Lots"), after a legend claiming that these verses were revealed to him by the Bodhisattva Avalokiteśvara (Kannon).

Historically, however, the Japanese omikuji system is thought to have been modeled after the Chinese kau chim, a similar form of divination involving a tube full of bamboo sticks and a sequence of written or printed oracles. A wooden container containing oracular lots dated 1409 (Ōei 16) is preserved in Tendai-ji in Iwate Prefecture, suggesting that this method of fortune telling was imported to Japan somewhere before the Muromachi period (1336–1573). The quatrains of the Ganzan Daishi Hyakusen are themselves ultimately based on a set of oracles dating from the Southern Song period (1127–1279) known as the Tiānzhú língqiān (天竺靈籤, lit. 'Indian Numinous Lot'; Japanese: Tenjiku reisen).

The Ganzan Daishi Hyakusen became popular in the Edo period due to the notable monk Tenkai (1536–1643), who is credited with attaching Ryōgen's name to it. A story related by one of Tenkai's disciples claims that Tenkai was once visited in a dream by Ryōgen, who revealed to him the existence of the 100 quatrains, which had been supposedly lost for centuries. Copies of these short poems were eventually discovered at Togakushi Shrine in Shinano Province (modern Nagano Prefecture) and widely disseminated. The Ganzan Daishi Hyakusen eventually became standard across many Buddhist temples (even those not affiliated with the Tendai school) and served as a model for other omikuji sequences. Various books explaining the meaning of the oracles were published during the period, suggesting their widespread popularity.

== Fortunes ==
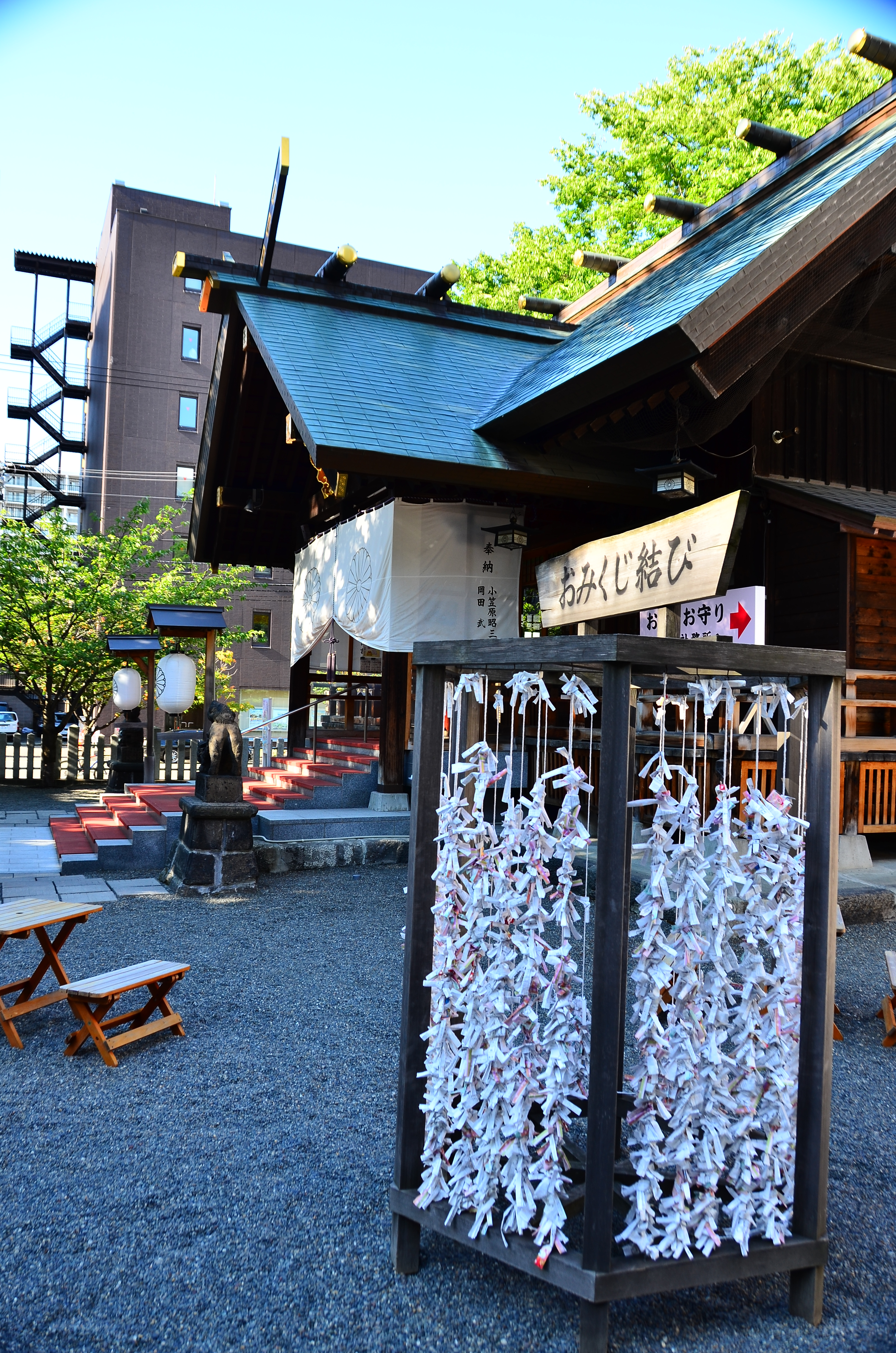
Omikuji at Hokkaido Shrine Tongu in Sapporo

The standard Ganzan Daishi Hyakusen sequence contains the following fortunes (from best to worst):

- Great blessing (大吉, dai-kichi)
- Blessing (吉, kichi)
- Small blessing (小吉, shō-kichi)
- Half-blessing (半吉, han-kichi)
- Future blessing (末吉, sue-kichi)
- Future small blessing (末小吉, sue-shō-kichi)
- Misfortune (凶, kyō)

Other sequences may include additional degrees such as "middle blessing" (中吉, chū-kichi), "great misfortune" (大凶, dai-kyō), or "blessing [and] misfortune still undetermined" (吉凶未分, kikkyō imada wakarazu; i.e. one's fortune could end up being either good or bad depending on one's actions).

It then lists fortunes regarding specific aspects of one's life, which may include any number of the following among other possible combinations:

- hōgaku (方角) – auspicious/inauspicious directions (see feng shui)
- negaigoto (願事) – one's wish or desire
- machibito (待人) – a person being waited for
- usemono (失せ物) – lost article(s)
- tabidachi (旅立ち) – travel
- akinai (商い) – business dealings
- gakumon (学問) – studies or learning
- sōba (相場) – market speculation
- arasoigoto (争事) – disputes
- ren'ai (恋愛) – romantic relationships
- tenkyo (転居) – moving or changing residence
- shussan (出産) – childbirth, delivery
- byōki (病気) – illness
- endan (縁談) – marriage proposal or engagement

== Relation to fortune cookies ==
The random fortunes in fortune cookies may be derived from omikuji; this is claimed by Seiichi Kito of Fugetsu-Do, and supported by evidence that American fortune cookies derive from 19th century Kyoto crackers called tsujiura senbei.

== Gallery ==
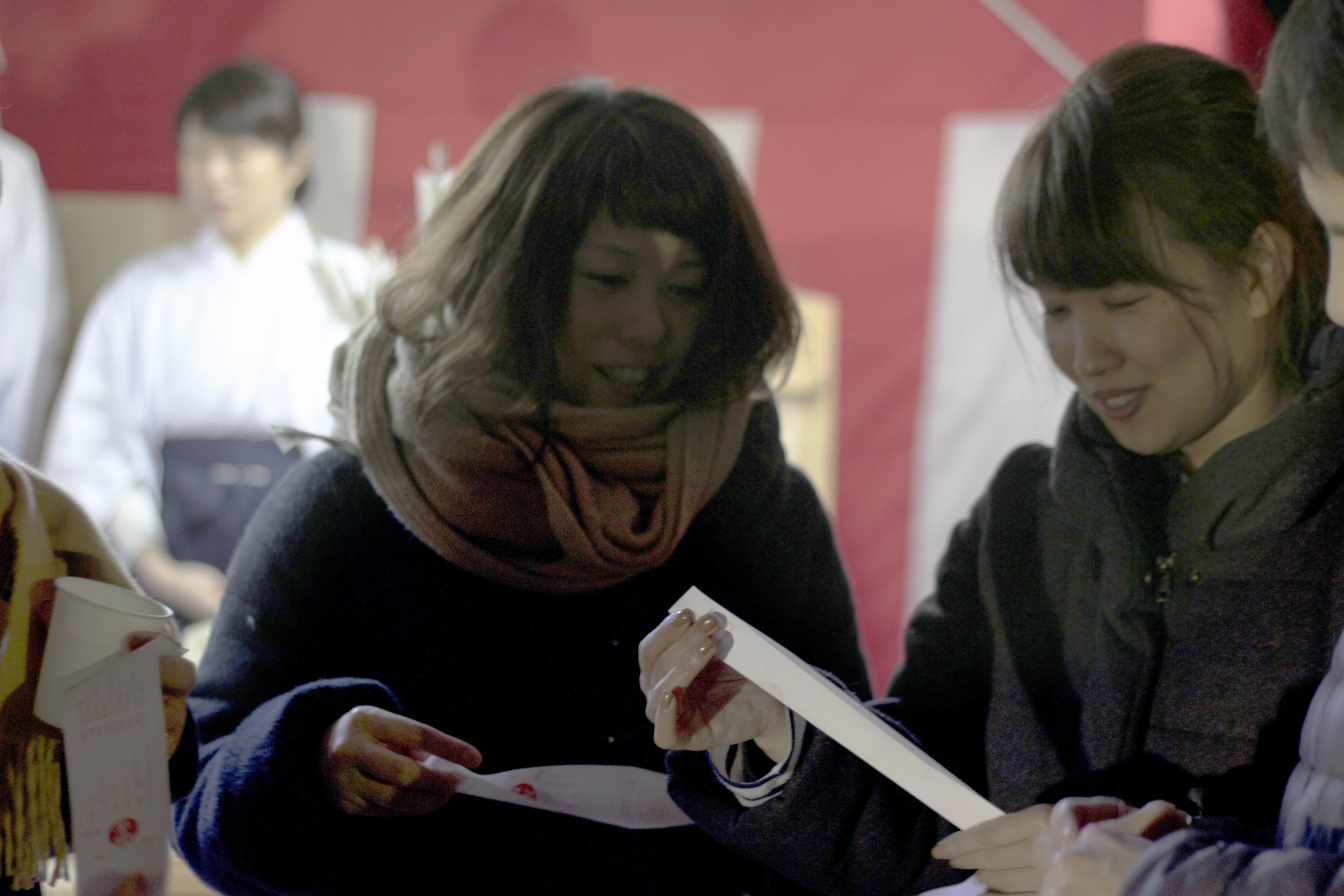
Young people in Osaka comparing omikuji on New Year's Eve

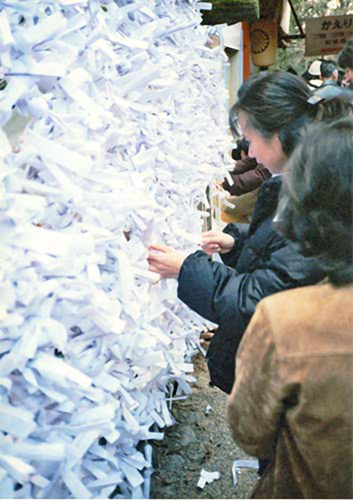
Tying omikuji at Kasuga Shrine in Nara

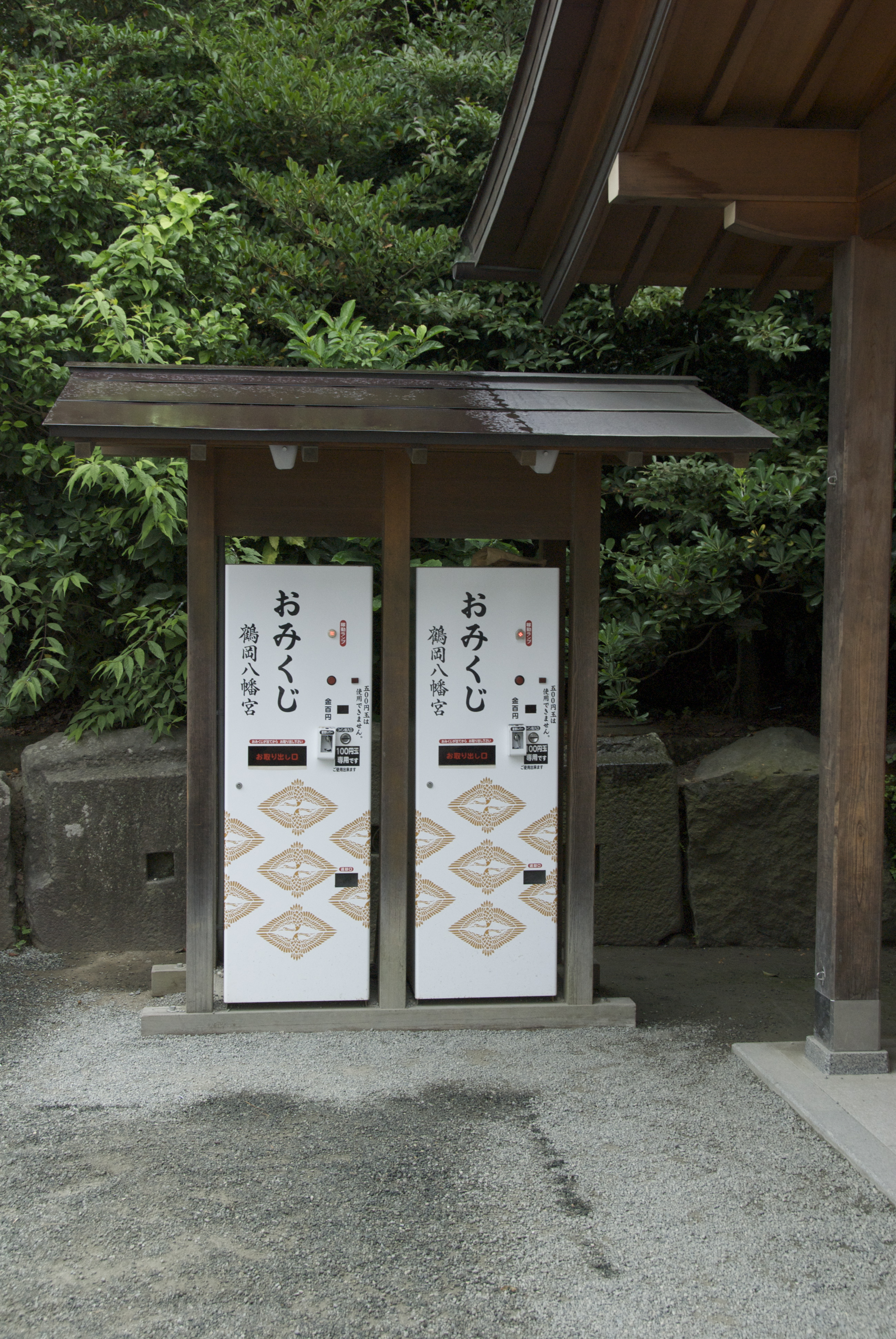
An omikuji vending machine at Tsurugaoka Hachiman-gū

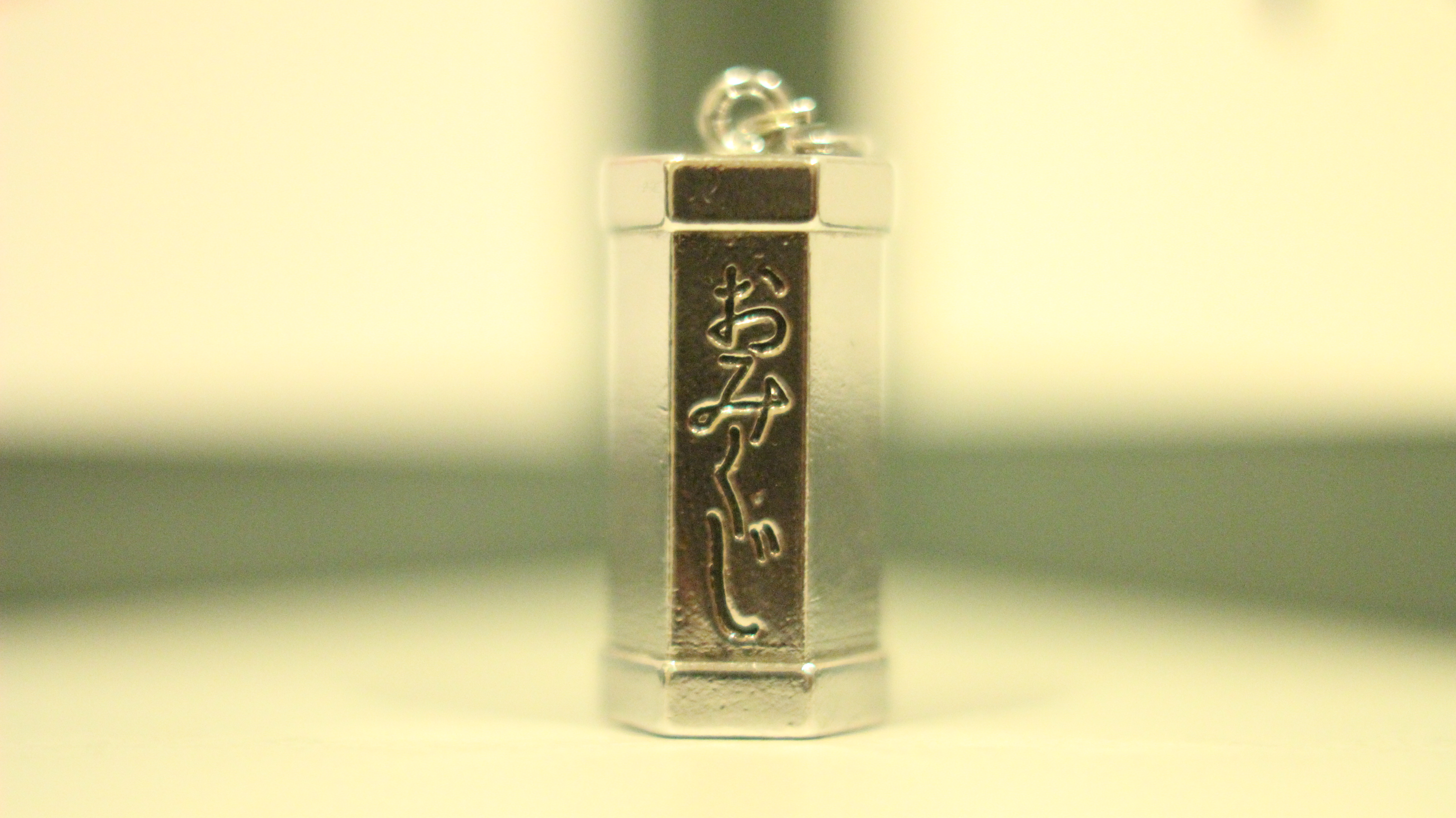
Pocket omikuji

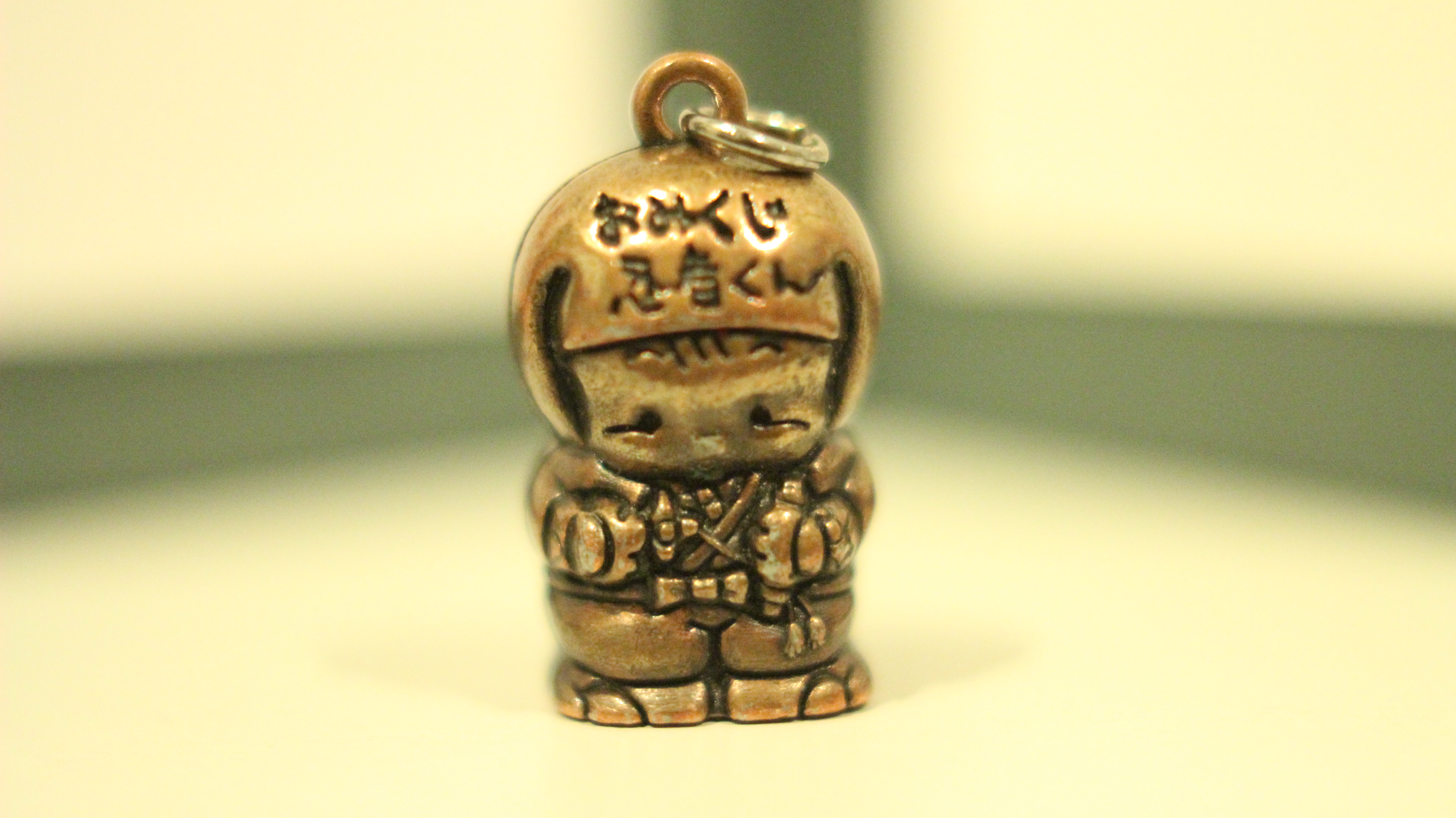
Decorative pocket omikuji

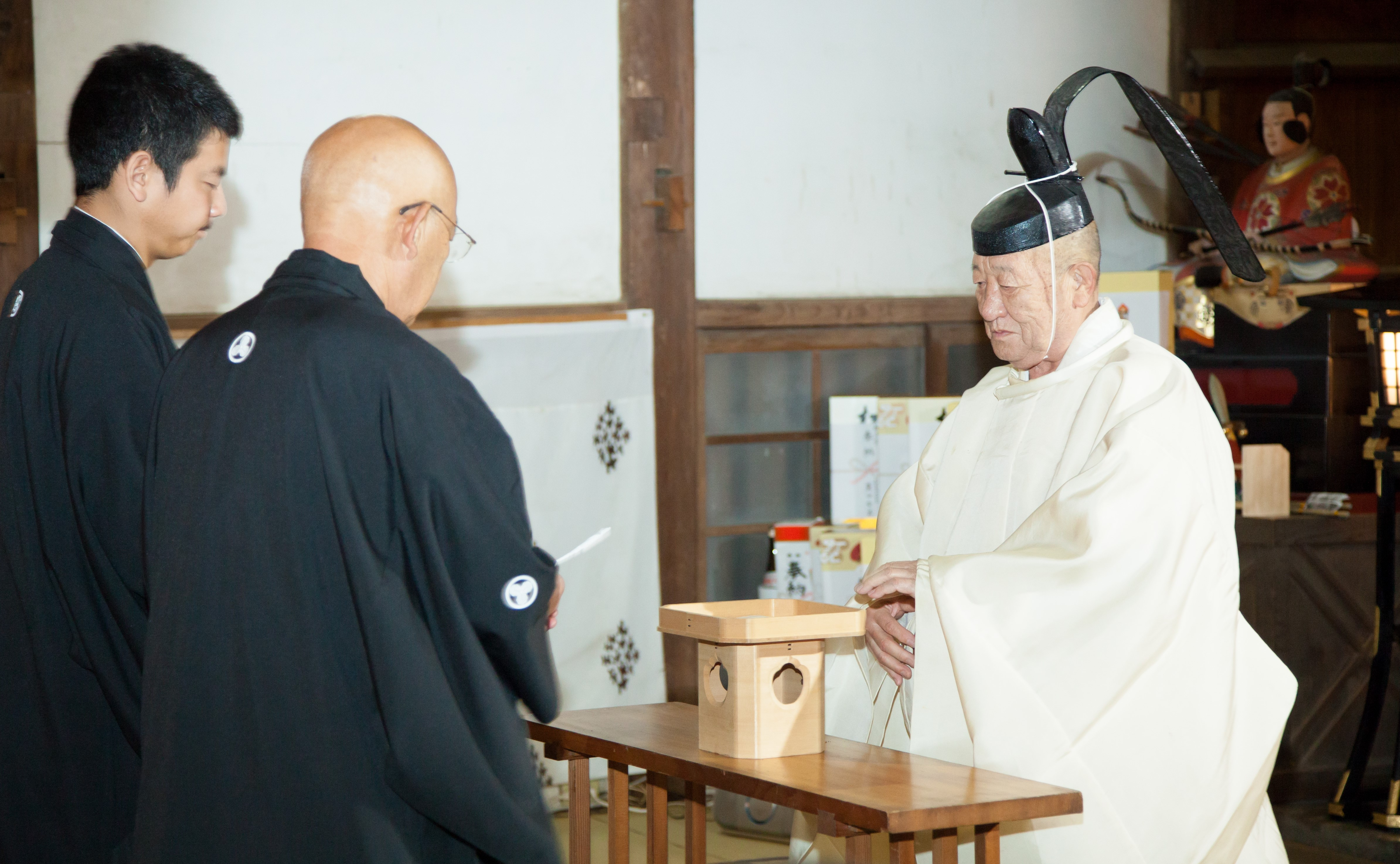
Omikuji ritual at Omuro Sengen Shrine, Fujiyoshida, Yamanashi

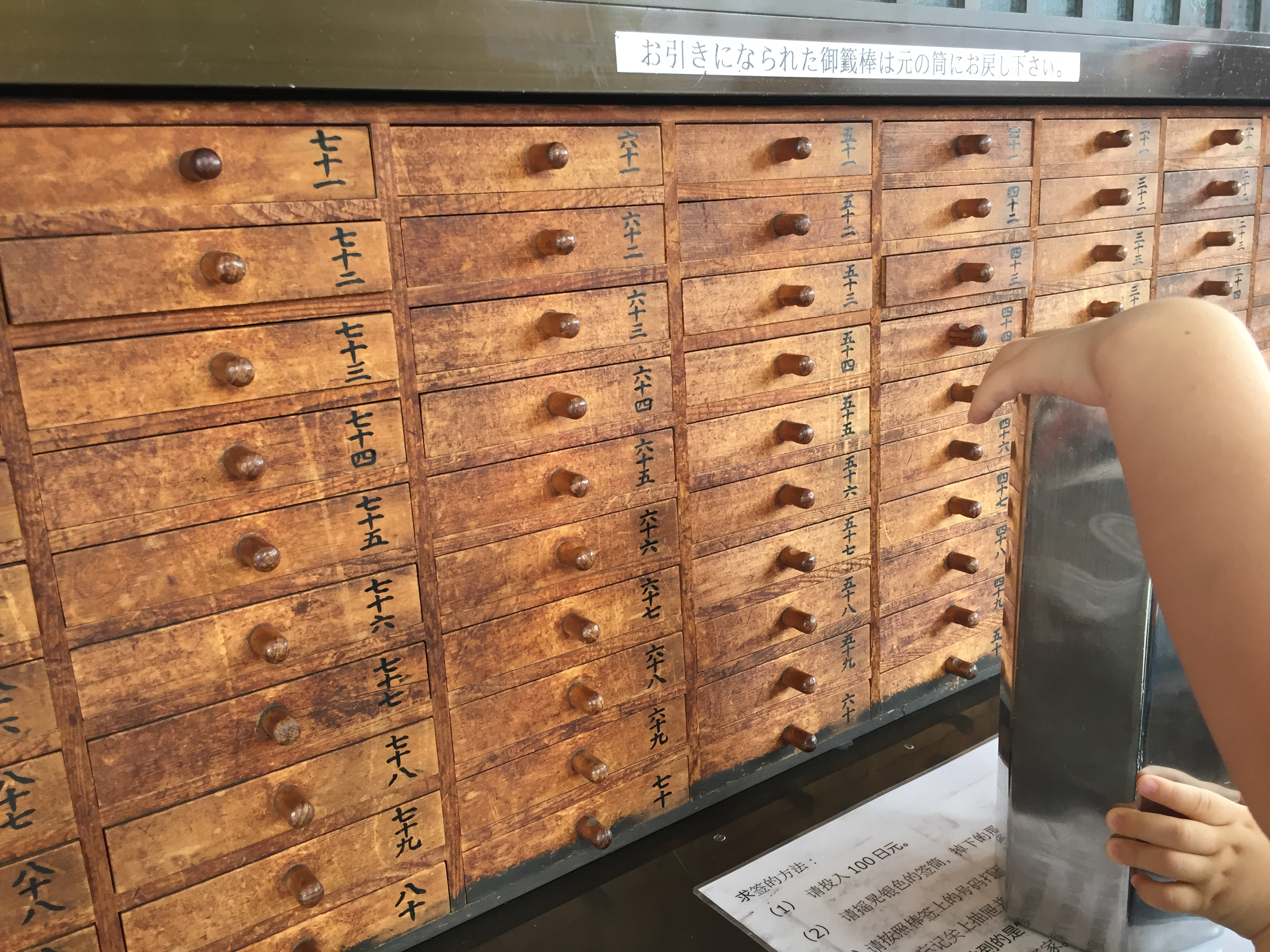
Children drawing omikuji fortune sticks from a metal cylinder at Asakusa Temple (Sensoji) in Tokyo, Japan.

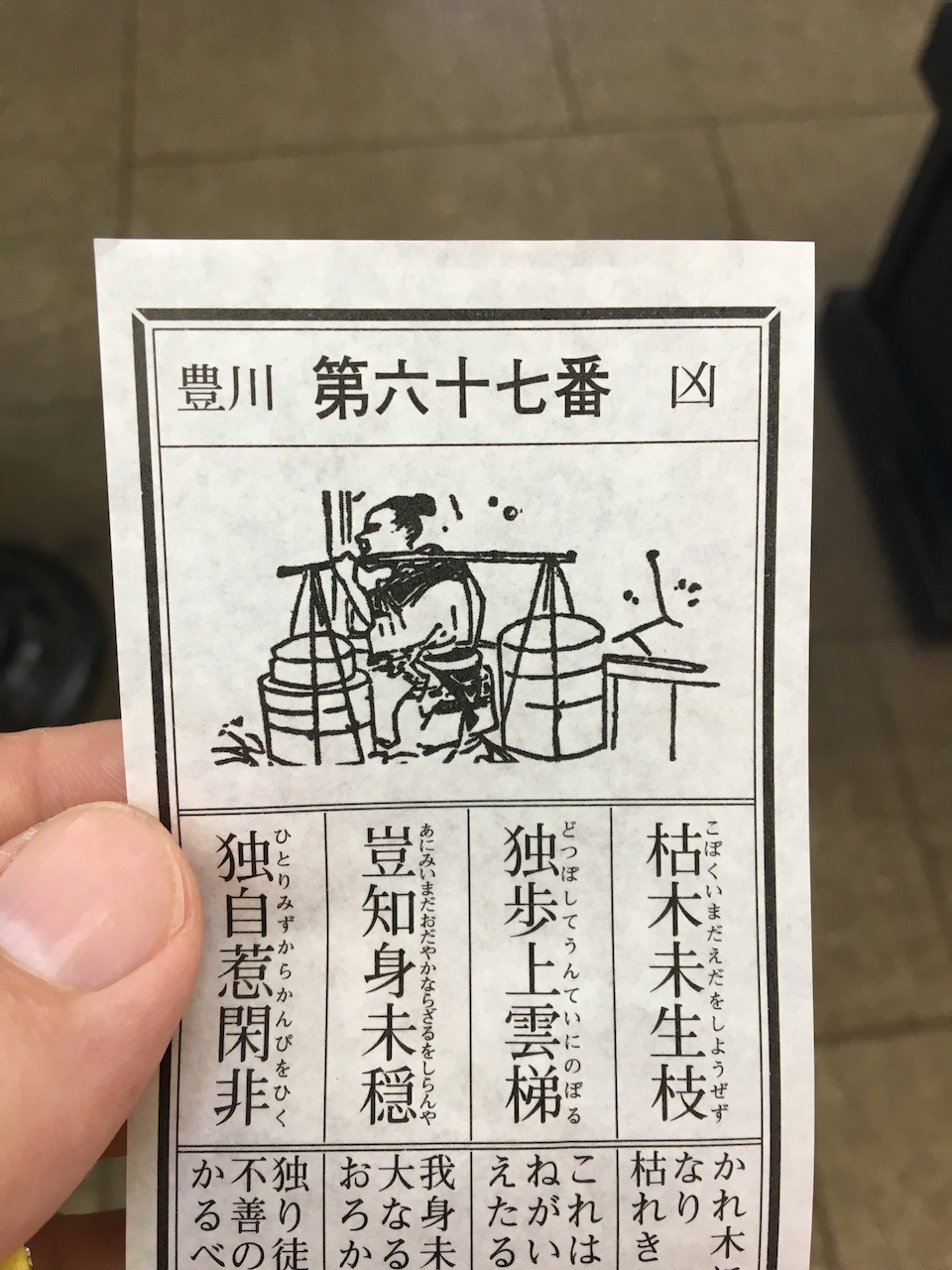
A bad omikuji fortune (凶, upper right) drawn at the Toyokawa Inari branch temple in Tokyo, Japan.

== See also ==
- Futomani
- I Ching divination
- Itako
- Kokkuri
- Kau chim
- Jiaobei
- Omamori
- Onmyōdō
- Poe divination
- Tengenjutsu
- Lotteries in Japan
