= Tui bei tu =

Chinese prophecy book from the 7th-century Tang dynasty

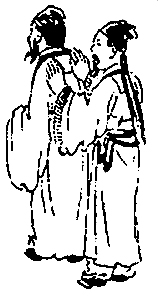
- Image of the last frame (60th) of Tui bei tu, which is the namesake of the book's name
- Author: Li Chunfeng, Yuan Tiangang
- Original title: 推背圖
- Illustrator: Li Chunfeng, Yuan Tiangang
- Language: Chinese
- Subject: prophecy
- Publication date: Tang dynasty
- Publication place: China
- Media type: print
- Original text: 推背圖 at Chinese Wikisource

Tui bei tu
- Traditional Chinese: 推背圖
- Simplified Chinese: 推背图
- Literal meaning: push back chart push back picture push back graphics
Transcriptions
Standard Mandarin
- Hanyu Pinyin: Tuī Bèi Tú
Yue: Cantonese
- Yale Romanization: teui1 bui3 tou4
- Jyutping: teoi1 bui3 tou4

Tui bei tu (traditional Chinese: 推背圖; simplified Chinese: 推背图; pinyin: tuī bèi tú) is a Chinese prophecy book from the 7th-century Tang dynasty. The book is known for predicting the future of China, and is written by Li Chunfeng and Yuan Tiangang (袁天罡), and has been compared to the works of famous western prophet Nostradamus. Well known in Hong Kong, Macau and Taiwan, the book was previously banned in the People's Republic of China under the Communist party for superstition (one of the "Four Olds"), though it has since reappeared in street-side book stalls in the 1990s as a bestseller.

== Description ==
The book is supposed to contain clues to China's future conveyed through a series of 60 surreal drawings, each accompanied by an equally obscure poem. The title means "Back-Pushing Sketch" and comes from the last illustration.

Each poem is a prophecy, which describes a Chinese historical event that will occur in order. For example, the 36th poem should occur before the 40th poem. Poem number 60 is the last prophecy. Some sources have said that out of the 60 prophecies, 55 of them are supposed to have already been fulfilled. Though just like Nostradamus's work, the interpretations largely depend on the individuals. Some scholars compared the different versions and found the book has been rewritten many times.

《中國預言七種》"the Seven Chinese Prophecies" 清溪散人編，1915（民國四年）上海 中華書局，文明書局 發行 Chunghwa Books, Shanghai, 1915

== Usage ==
During the end-of-dynasty turmoil, rebels used it to prophesize victory for their cause and thereby drum up public support. As the introduction to one mainland China version of the book explained, Tui Bei Tu is a way of shaping public opinion used by feudal rulers to seize power or consolidate power. It is also similarly used by oppressed people to overthrow their rulers.

== See also ==
- I Ching
- Lingqijing
- Lo Shu Square
- Qi Men Dun Jia
- Tung shing
- Jiaobei
- Kau Cim
- Shaobing Song, another famous Chinese prophetic text
- Chinese classic texts
