= Tung Shing =

Chinese divination guide

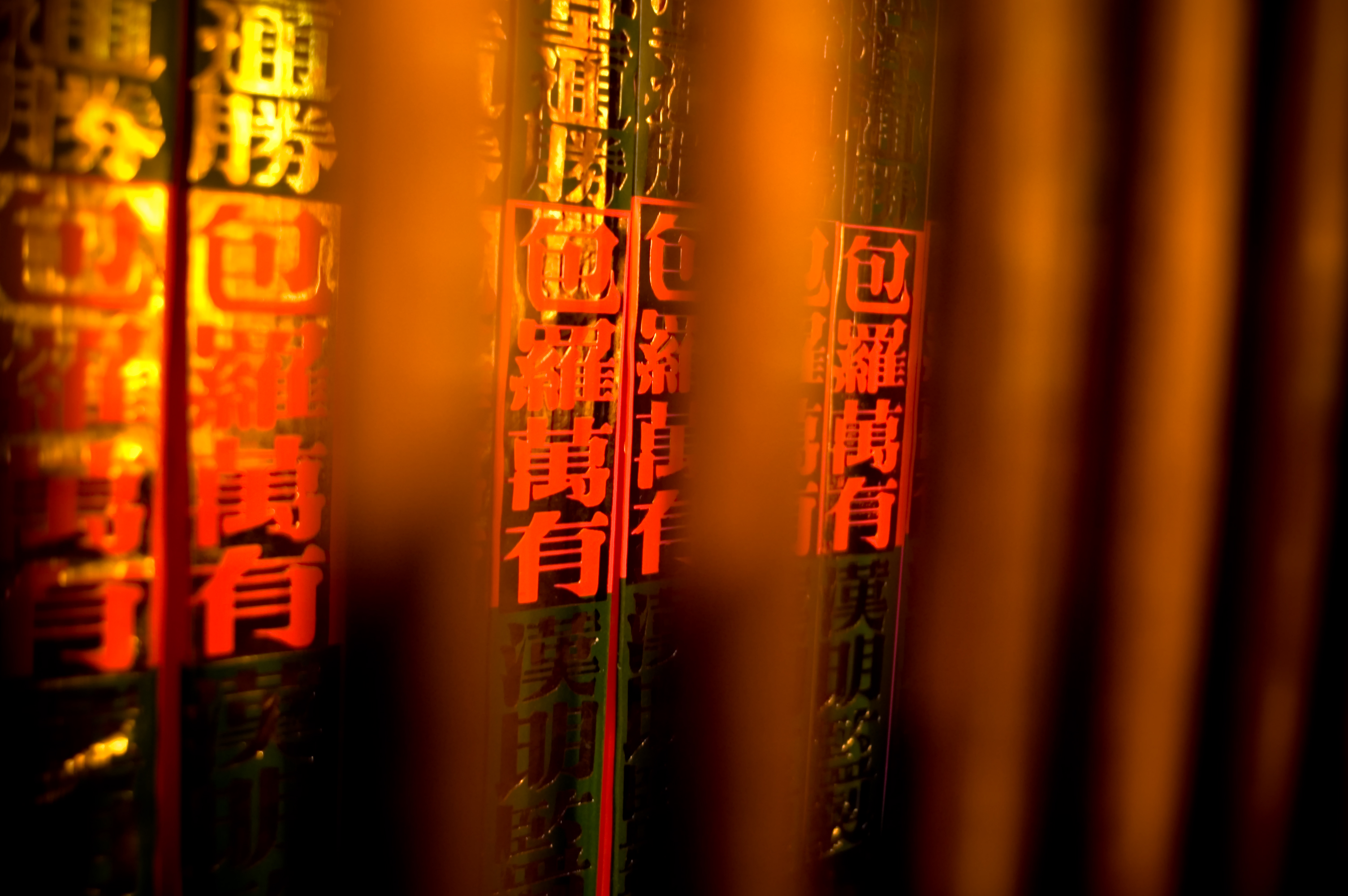
- Traditional Chinese: 通勝
- Simplified Chinese: 通胜
Transcriptions
Standard Mandarin
- Hanyu Pinyin: Tōngshèng
- Wade–Giles: T'ung^{1}-sheng^{4}
Yue: Cantonese
- Yale Romanization: Tūng sing
- Jyutping: Tung^{1} sing^{3}
Southern Min
- Hokkien POJ: Thong-sèng

Tung Shing
- Traditional Chinese: 通書
- Simplified Chinese: 通书
Transcriptions
Standard Mandarin
- Hanyu Pinyin: Tōngshu
Southern Min
- Hokkien POJ: thong-su

Tung Shing
- Traditional Chinese: 農民曆
- Simplified Chinese: 农民历
Transcriptions
Standard Mandarin
- Hanyu Pinyin: nóngmínlì
Southern Min
- Hokkien POJ: lông-bîn-li̍k

Tung Shing (Chinese: 通勝), also called the Yellow Calendar or the Imperial Calendar, is a Chinese divination guide and almanac. It consists primarily of a calendar based on the Chinese solar terms rather than the Chinese lunar-solar calendar.

== History ==
Tung Shing originated from Wong Lik (黃曆, the "Yellow Calendar"), which legend attributes to the Yellow Emperor. It has changed its form numerous times throughout the years during all the dynasties; the latest version was said to have been edited under the Qing dynasty and was called the Tung Shu (通書). Tung (通) means "all", Shu (書) means "book", so Tung Shu literally meant "All-knowing Book". However, in Cantonese Chinese and Mandarin Chinese, the pronunciation of the word for "book" is a homophone of a word for defeated (輸), so Tung Shu sounded like "Defeated in All Things" (通輸). Therefore, the name was changed to Tung Shing (通勝), which means "Victorious in All Things".

== Contents ==
Most of the contents of the book deals with what is suitable to do on each day. Some Chinese families still follow these days for wedding ceremonies, funerals, etc.

Tung Shing is also used by many fung shui practitioners and destiny diviners to complement other date selection methods for selecting dates and times for important events like marriages, official opening ceremonies, house moving-in and big contract signings, as well as smaller events like time to start renovations or travel.

The most common use of Tung Shing is in choosing a wedding date. Tung Shing contains information on the auspicious and inauspicious days for weddings or engagements. In addition, it provides the auspicious timing in which to carry out such activities.

Tung Shing also provide a conversion of years and date between the lunar year and the common year. In more detailed versions, the calendar will list eclipses (both solar and lunar), the start of each season, and days when it will be cold or hot. It also teaches ethics and values through stories.

Tung Shing sold in Hong Kong, Macau and Taiwan are based on two late-Qing versions. It is known for its English definitions and words transliterated into Cantonese characters.

== Gallery ==
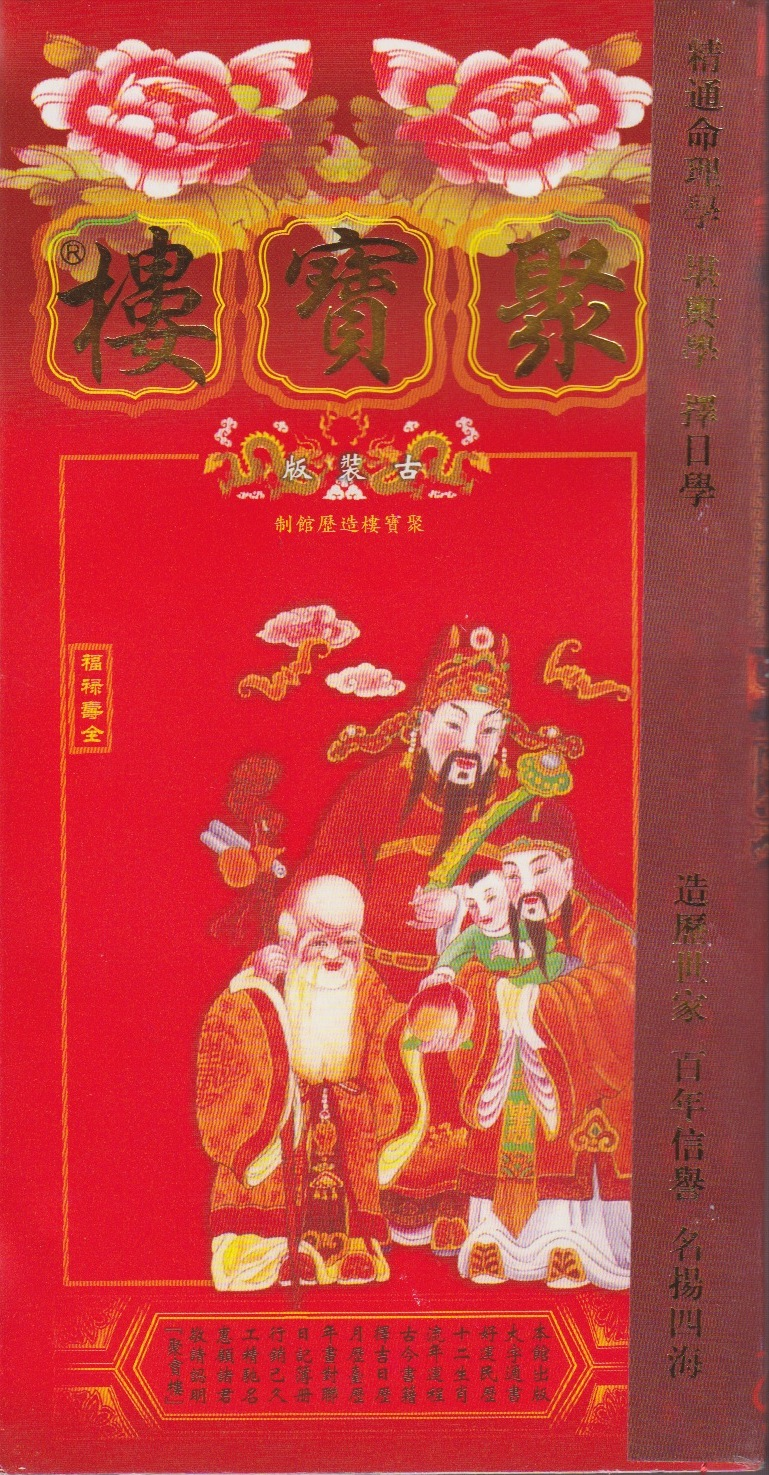
Cover of a version of 通勝 Tung Shing from year 2010

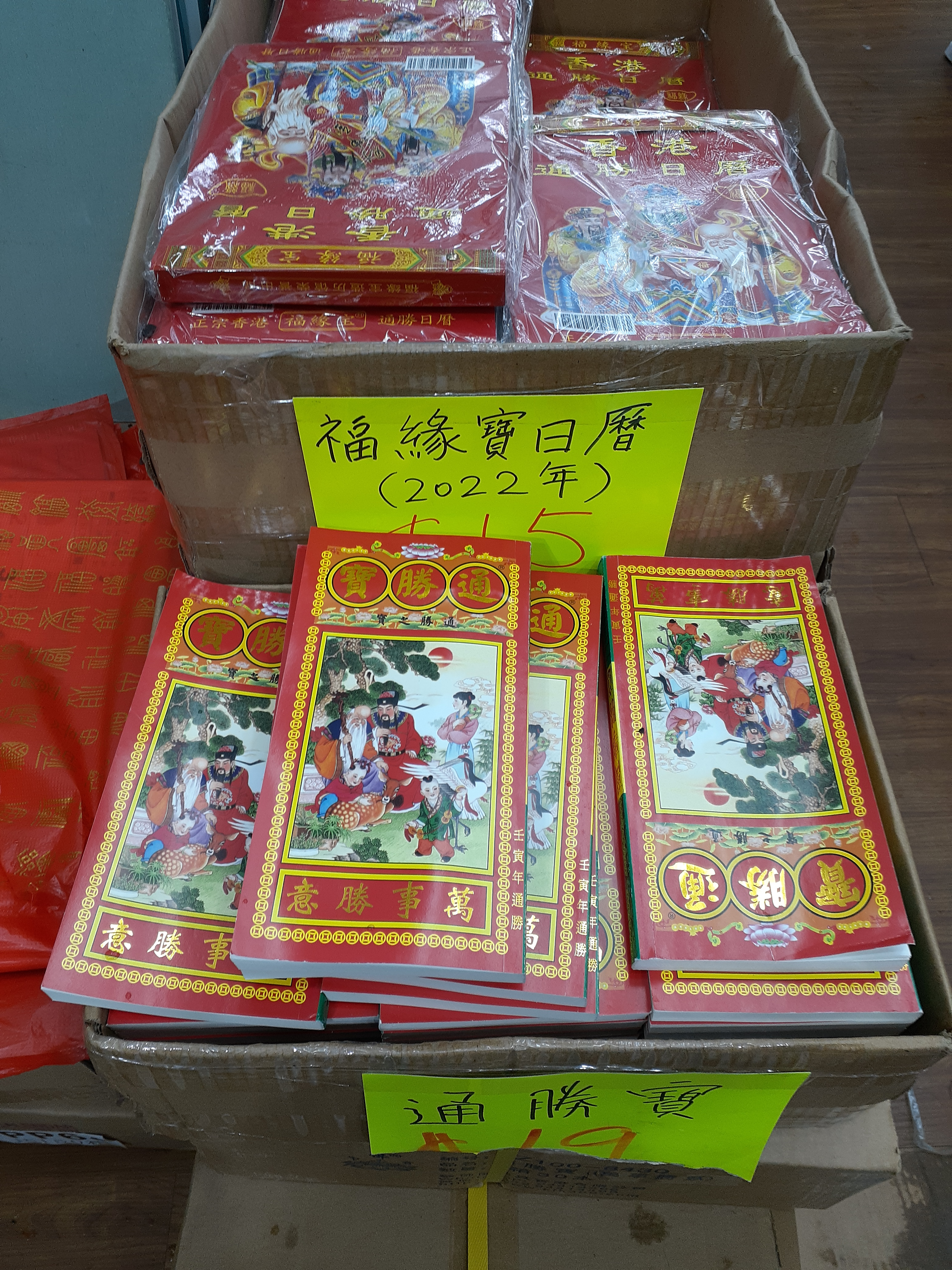
Tung Shing sold at a market

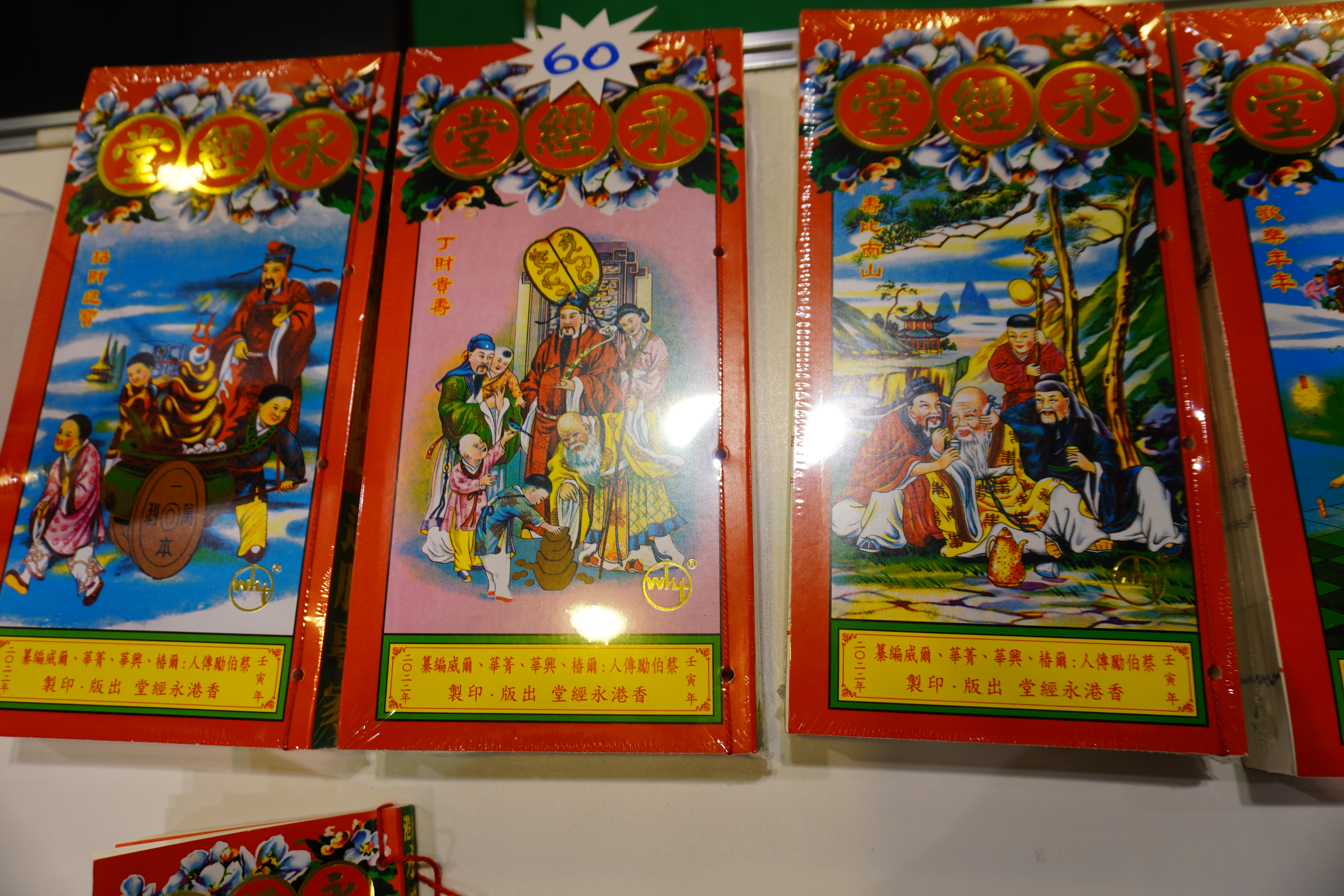
Covers depicting, from left: wealth, family, longevity

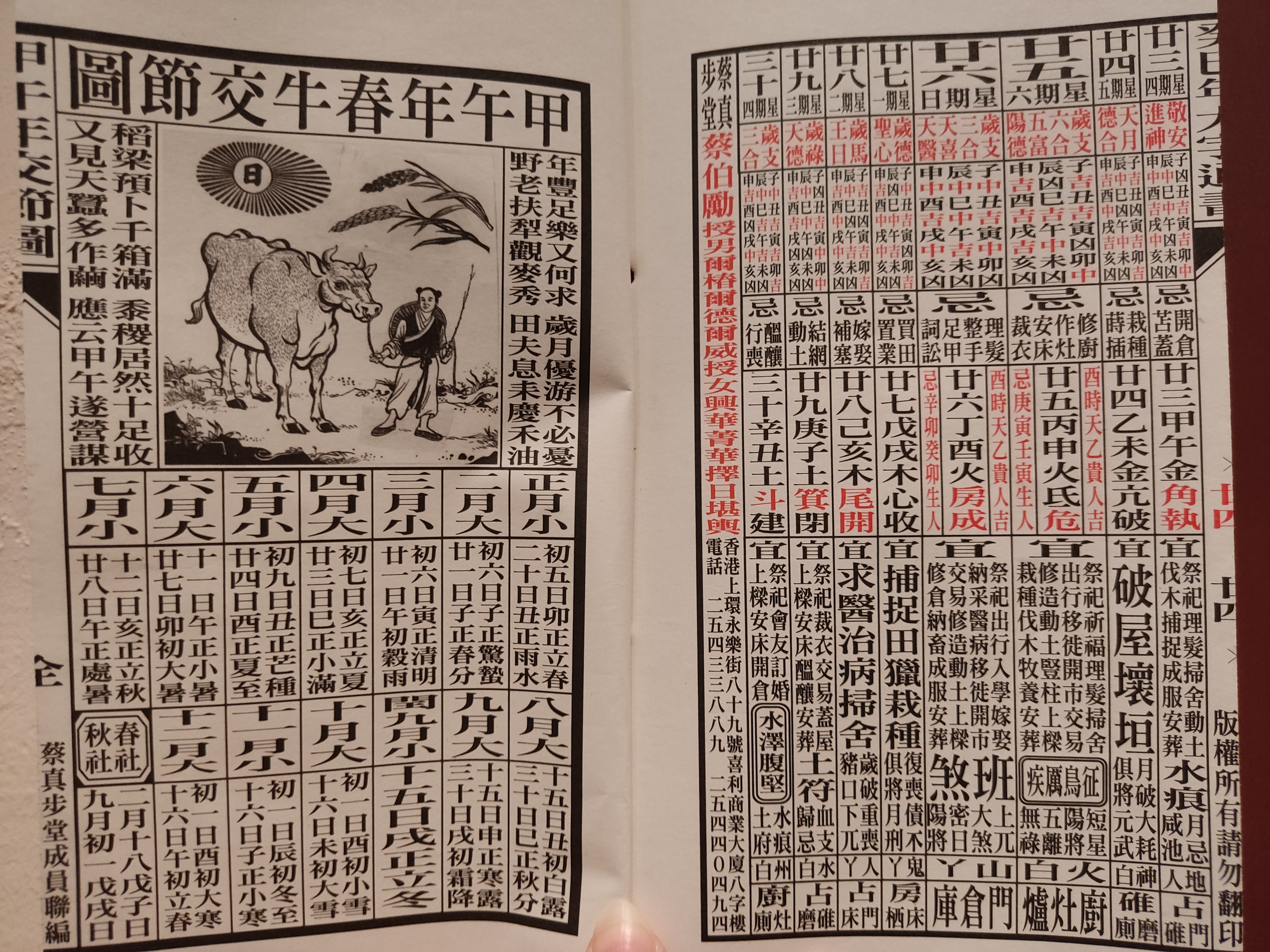
Spring Cow Chart (春牛图) and lunar week

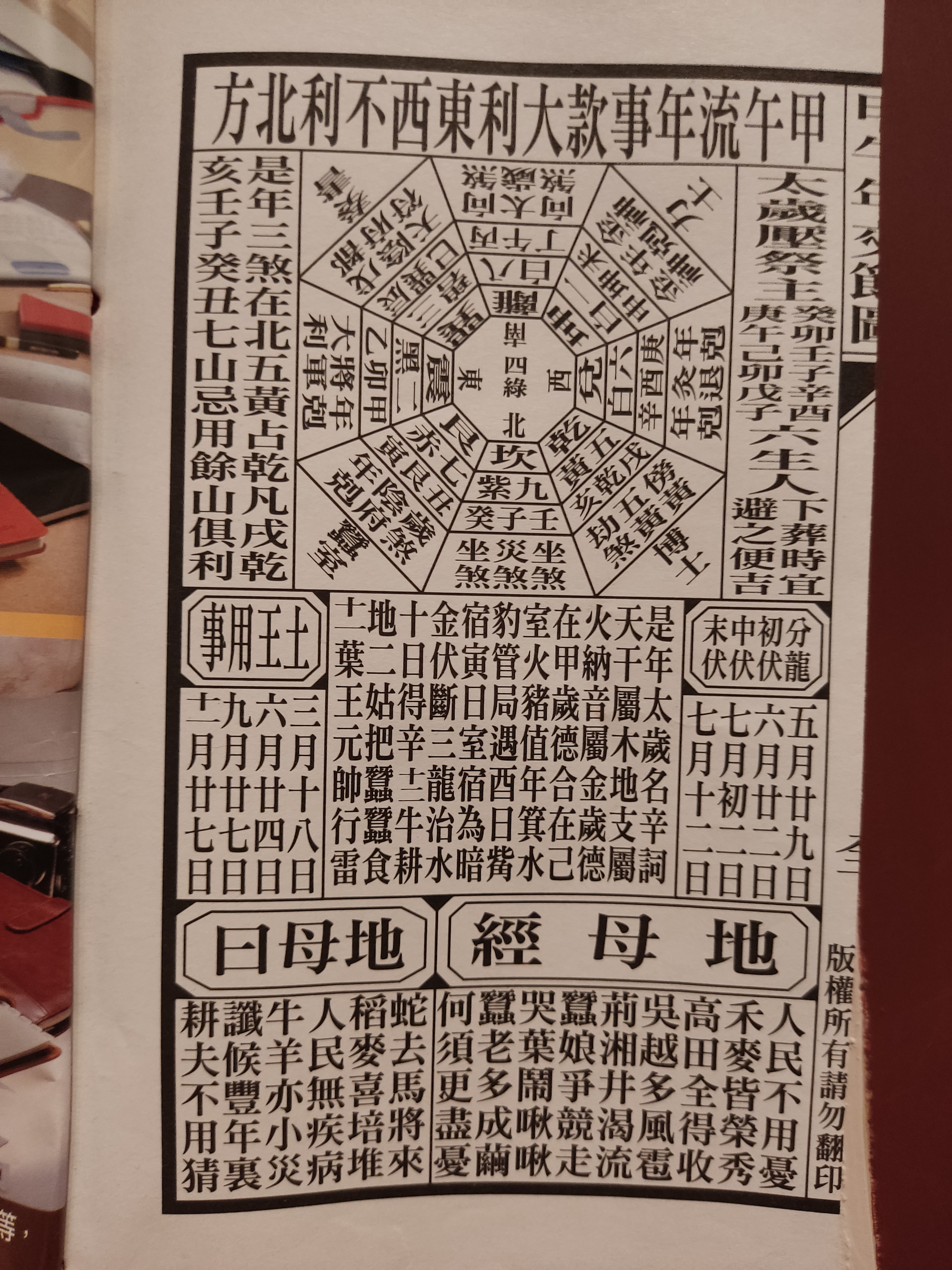
Feng shui and agricultural forecast

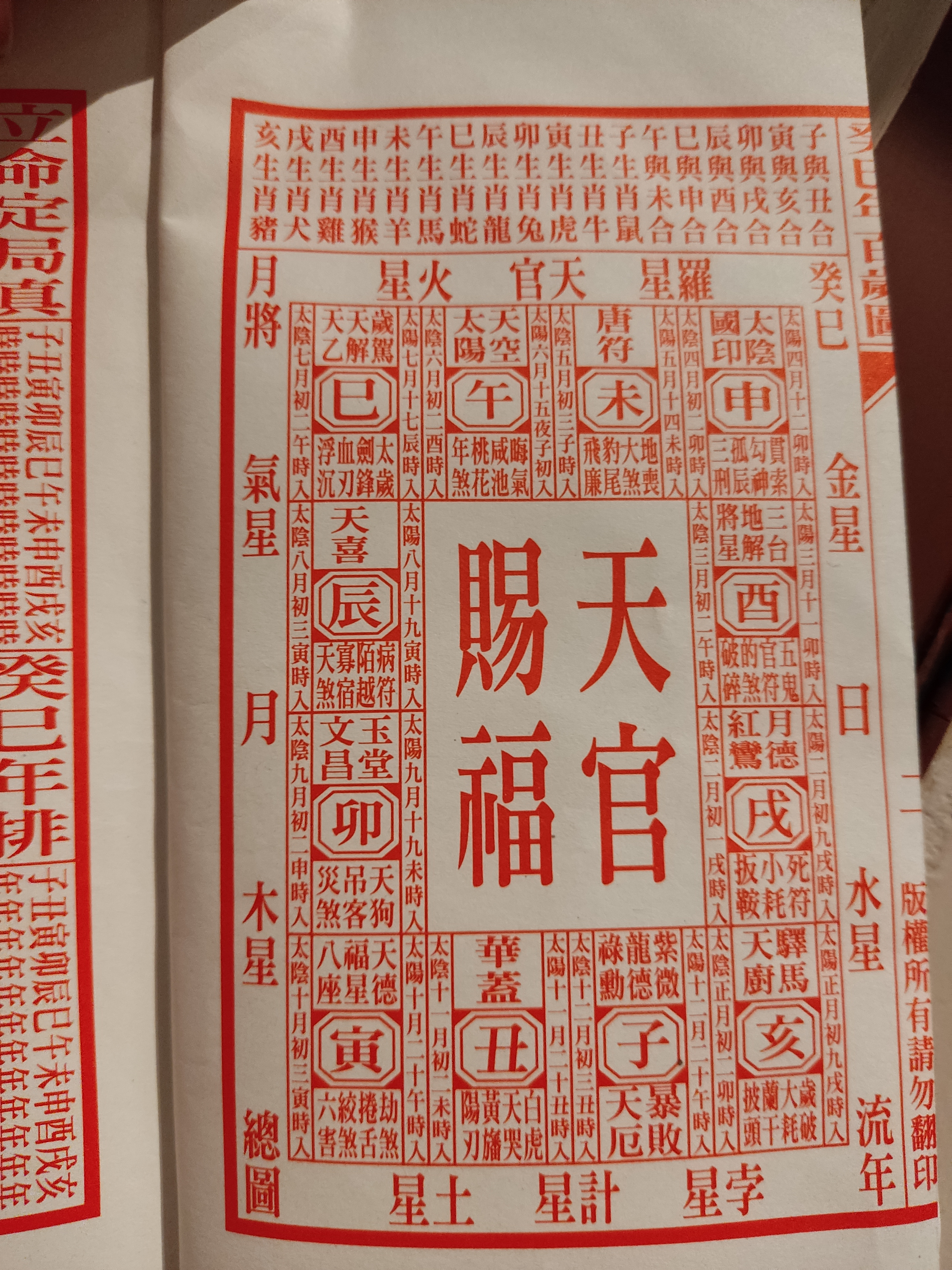
Heaven Official's Blessing (天官賜福) chart

== Other specialties ==
- Interpret one's fate
- Measure one's soul weight (requires Four Pillars of Destiny)
- Face reading and palm reading charts
- "For many centuries the T'ung Shu was known as the Farmers' Almanac, and most of its practical information was geared to weather, crops, sowing, harvesting and so forth."

== See also ==
- Chinese astrology
- Da Liu Ren (大六壬)
- Fuji (planchette writing)
- Fulu
- I Ching divination
- Lingqijing
- Kau Cim
- Qi Men Dun Jia (奇門遁甲)
- Shaobing Song
- Tai Sui
- Tai Yi Shen Shu (太乙神數)
- Tangki
- Tui bei tu
- Wen Wang Gua
