= Shaobing Song =

Poem purported to be written by Liu Bowen during the Ming dynasty

- Traditional Chinese: 燒餅歌
- Simplified Chinese: 烧饼歌
- Literal meaning: shaobing song
Transcriptions
Standard Mandarin
- Hanyu Pinyin: shao1 bing5 ge1
Yue: Cantonese
- Jyutping: siu1 beng2 go1

The Shaobing Song (Chinese: 燒餅歌), also known as Pancake Poem or Pancake Song, is a poem purported to be written by Liu Bowen during the Ming dynasty. He supposedly presented the poem to the Hongwu Emperor.

== Prophecy ==
The poem is named after the Chinese pastry shaobing. It is written in cryptic form and is difficult to understand. Some believe that certain lines contain references to the future of China at the time including:

- Jingnan campaign (1399-1402)
- Tumu Crisis
- Rise of Zheng He
- Political unrest of Wei Zhongxian (魏忠贤乱政)
- Fall of the Ming dynasty and rise of the Qing dynasty
- First Opium War
- First Sino-Japanese War
- Founding of the Republic of China

== Evaluations ==
Some Chinese researchers claimed that Pancake Poem is quite spiritual and is representative of the Chinese prophecy culture.

However, most of the work's predictions of what would happen after 1911 are too vague and inaccurate. This led some experts to believe the work is a hoax of recent production, designed to reassure people that all would be well when there was much unrest as a consequence of the Japanese invasion and the rise of communism.

== See also ==
- I Ching
- Lingqijing
- Lo Shu Square
- Qi Men Dun Jia
- Tui bei tu, another Chinese famous prophetic text
- Tung shing
- Kau Cim
- Chinese classic texts
