= Jiaobei =

Chinese wooden divination tools

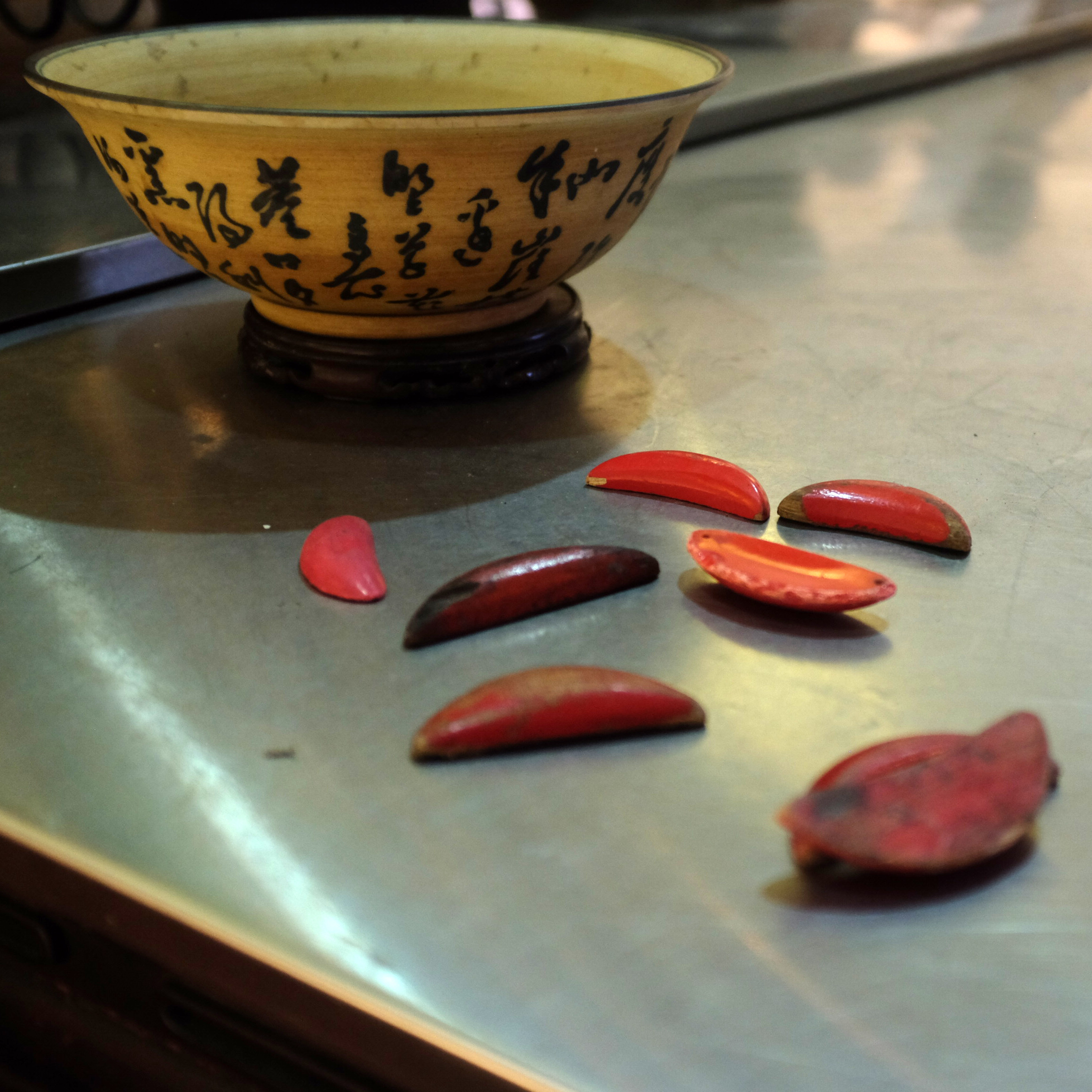
- A set of moon blocks in Yueh Hai Ching temple
- Chinese: 筊杯
Transcriptions
Standard Mandarin
- Hanyu Pinyin: jiǎobēi
- Bopomofo: ㄐㄧㄠˇ ㄅㄟ
- Wade–Giles: chiau^{3}-pei^{1}
Yue: Cantonese
- Jyutping: gaau2 bui1
Eastern Min
- Fuzhou BUC: gá-buŏi

Alternative Chinese name
- Chinese: 桮
Transcriptions
Southern Min
- Hokkien POJ: poe
- Tâi-lô: pue
Eastern Min
- Fuzhou BUC: buŏi

Second alternative Chinese name
- Chinese: 筊仔
Transcriptions
Hakka
- Pha̍k-fa-sṳ: kâu-é

Moon blocks, jiaobei (also written as jiao bei; Chinese: 筊杯 or 珓杯; pinyin: jiǎo bēi), or poe (from Chinese: 桮; Pe̍h-ōe-jī: poe; as used in the term "poe divination"), are wooden divination tools originating from China, which are used in pairs and thrown to seek divine guidance in the form of a yes or no question. They are made out of wood or bamboo and carved into a crescent shape. A pair of clam shells can also be used.

Each block is round on one side (known as the yin side) and flat on the other (known as the yang side). It is one of the more commonly used items found in Chinese traditional religion, along with fortune sticks, and are used in temples and home shrines. Moon blocks and fortune sticks are often used together when requesting an answer from deities.

== Practice ==
Simplified interpretation of poe divination outcomes

A woman using poe divination at Xingtian Temple, Taiwan

In poe divination, moon blocks can be used by themselves, or they can be accompanied by fortune sticks to clarify an oracle. Occasionally, coins of similar face value and design are substituted for moon blocks. When used alone, moon blocks are first purified by revolving the blocks around the incense burner three times. The questioner then kneels and says their name, date of birth, residence, and question while cupping the blocks between their hands in prayer. The blocks are dropped on the floor.

There are four possible answers that the moon blocks can produce:

1. Shèngjiǎo (聖筊; "divine answer"): One flat block and one round block. A "yes" answer.
2. Nùjiǎo (怒筊; "angry answer"), also kūjiao (哭筊; "crying answer") or méijiǎo (沒筊; "no answer"): Two flat blocks. A "no" answer. It is said that the gods are displeased or show disagreement with the question, and this is shown in the way the blocks fall flat.
3. Xiàojiǎo (笑筊; "laughing answer"): Two round blocks. This has several interpretations; in any case it is said the gods are laughing at the question. It can be interpreted as an emphasized "no" answer, that the question is unclear, or that the answer is obvious. One characteristic of this answer is when the blocks sway back and forth when dropped, which symbolizes laughter.
4. Lìjiǎo (立筊; "standing answer"): One or both blocks standing up on the two pointed ends. It is said that the deities do not understand the question, and the procedure must be repeated.

When used alone without the fortune sticks, the blocks are thrown three times in order to maintain accuracy of the deity's answer. A successful answer is usually three consecutive throws showing shèngjiǎo, or at best, two out of three throws.

Poe divination can be observed at Taoist and Chinese temples, such as Guangdi temples and Mazu temples. While it is most common in China and Taiwan, it is also practiced in the rest of the world.

== Usages ==
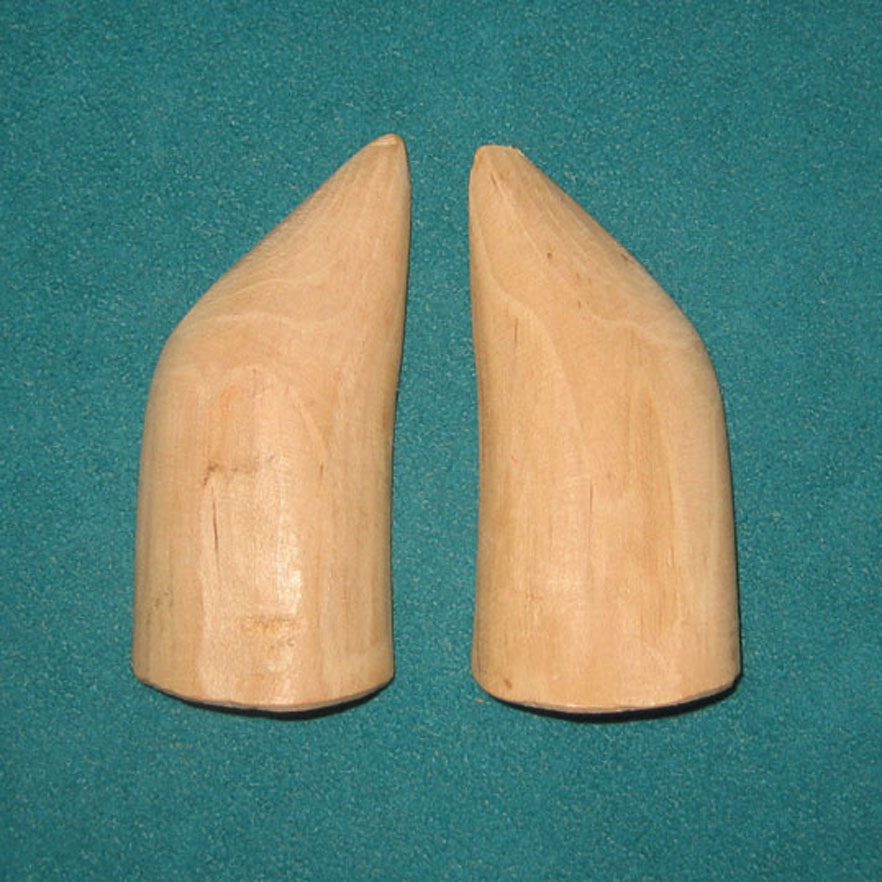
Moon blocks

Aside from questioning the deities on mundane affairs, moon blocks are also used to verify a range of issues, such as proper ritual protocol, spiritual presence of the gods or if they have eaten the offerings presented to them.

Jiaobei are depicted as one of the nine treasures of the goddess Mazu, known as the Xiantao Jiaobei (仙桃擲筊).

== See also ==
- Binary lot
- Feng shui
- Fuji (planchette writing)
- Jailangkung
- Kau cim
- Omikuji
- Oracle
- Tangki
- Tung Shing
