= Kau chim =

Chinese fortune telling practice

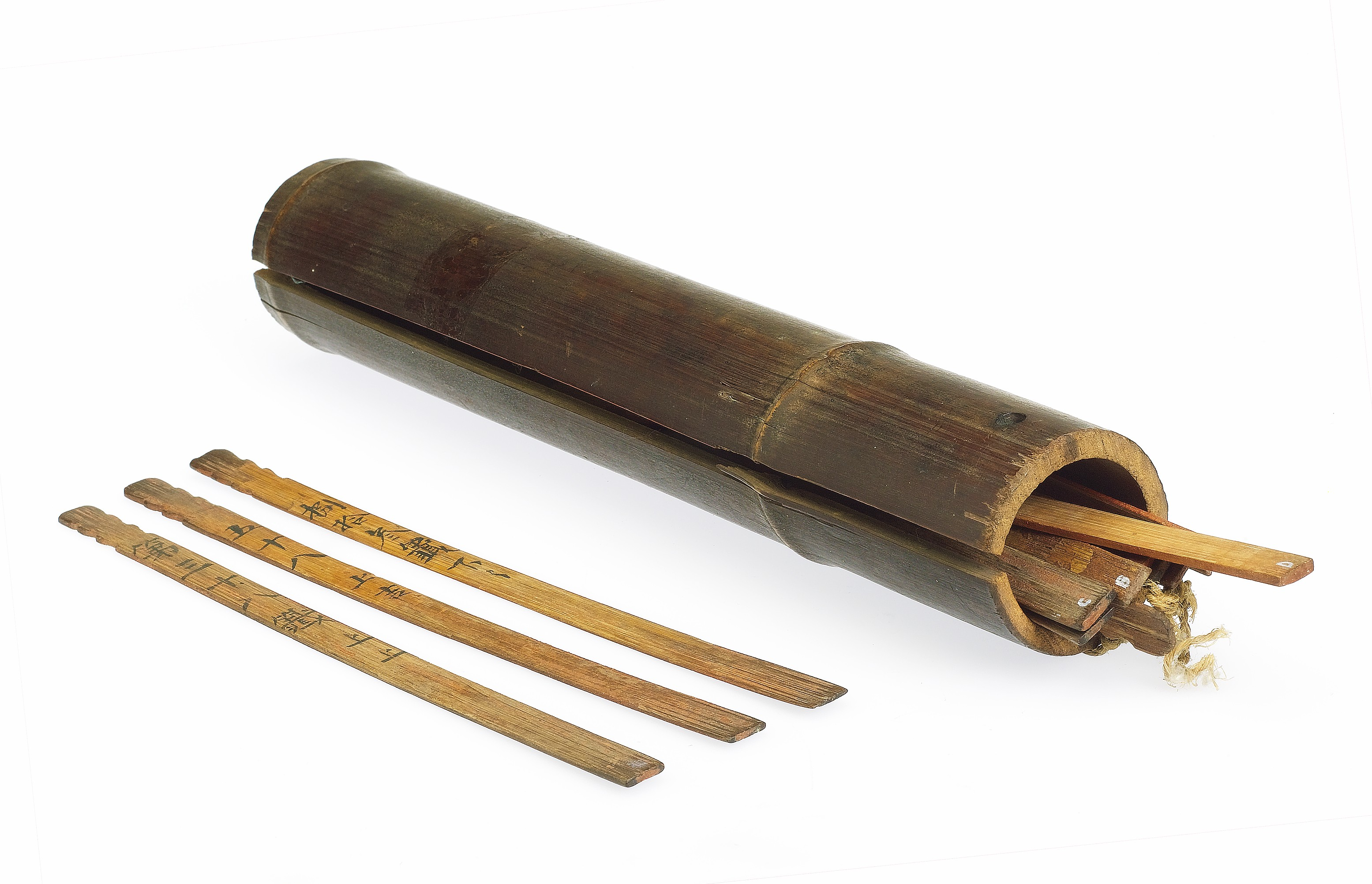
- Chien Tung sticks, cylindrical container with 18 inscribed sticks, China, 1800–1920
- Traditional Chinese: 求籤
- Simplified Chinese: 求签
- Literal meaning: Request or beg a stick
Transcriptions
Standard Mandarin
- Hanyu Pinyin: qiúqiān
Yue: Cantonese
- Sidney Lau: kau4 chim1

Kau chim, kau cim, chien tung, "lottery poetry" and Chinese fortune sticks are names for a fortune telling practice that originated in China in which a person poses questions and interprets answers from flat sticks inscribed with text or numerals. The practice is often performed in a Taoist or Chinese Buddhist temple in front of an altar. In the US, a version has been sold since 1915 under the name chi chi sticks. It is also sometimes known as "The Oracle of Kuan Yin" in Chinese Buddhist traditions, a reference to the bodhisattva Guanyin. It is widely available in Thai temples, known using the Teochew dialect as siam si (Thai: เซียมซี). The similar practice is also found in Japan, named O-mikuji.

== Tools ==
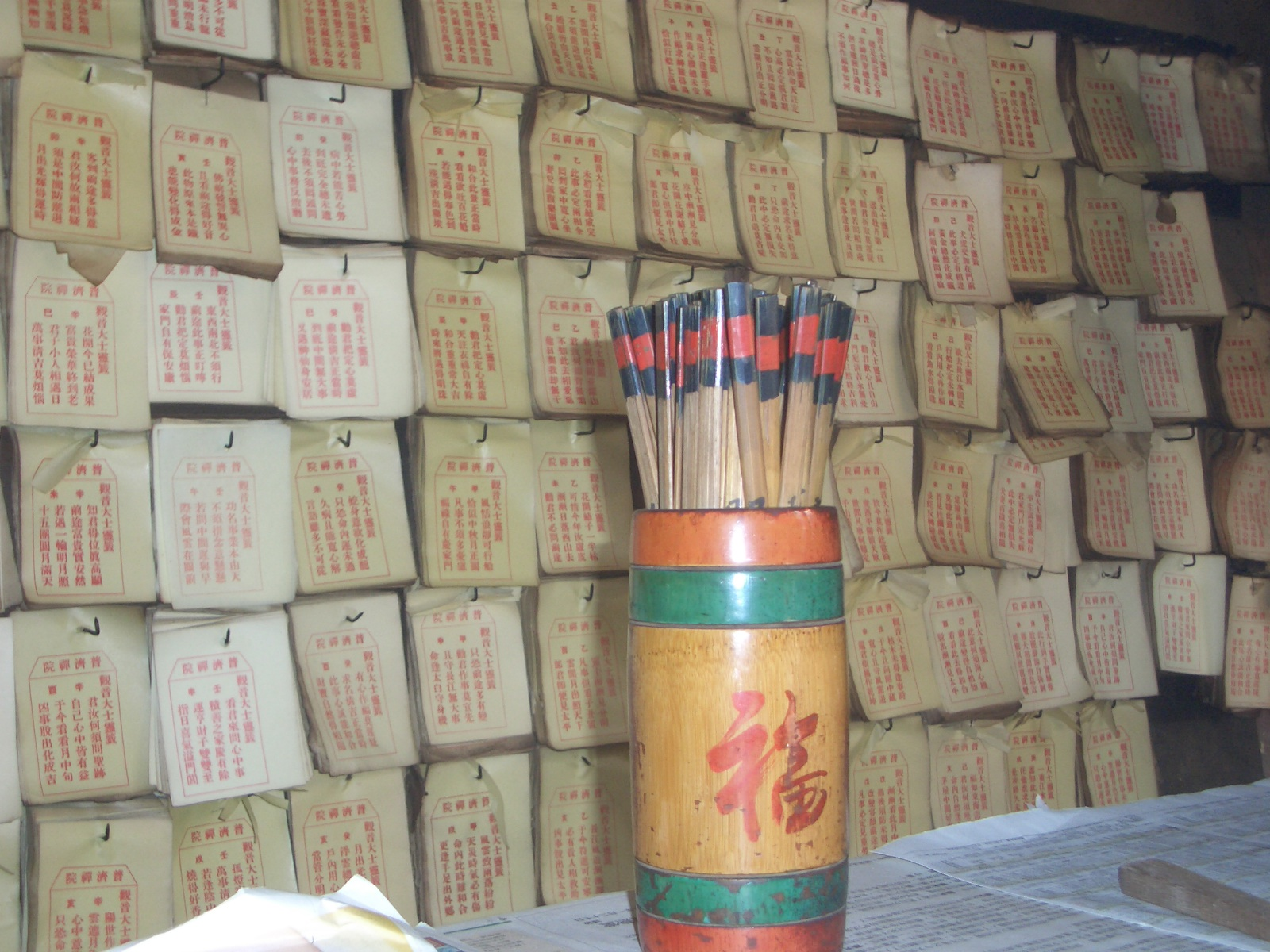
The lottery and lottery poems in a Hong-Kong temple.

- Chim bucket (Chinese: 籤筒; pinyin: qiāntǒng; Jyutping: cim^{1}tung^{4}): A long cylindrical bamboo cup or tube.
- Kau chim sticks (籤; qiān; cim^{1}): The flat sticks which are stored in the tube. Generally made of bamboo, they resemble wide, flat incense sticks, and are often painted red at one end. A single number, both in Arabic numerals and in Chinese characters, is inscribed on each stick. Each stick has a different number on it, and no two are alike. There are usually a total of 100 sticks in the cup, although the chi chi sticks variation sold in the US for fortune telling has only 78 sticks.
- 100 written oracle outcomes (or 78, for the Chi Chi sticks variation). A German, Werner Banck, has classified the contents of 420 sets into 24 categories and 160 sub-categories.

== History ==
The practice of kau chim or chien tung interpretation dates back to the Jin dynasty, according to the Jade Box Records, an ancient Chinese book on date selection, written by the famous Taoist monk Xu Xun in the 3rd century AD. Despite the Cultural Revolution in mainland China during the 1960s and 1970s, lottery poetry still persists today in temples in Taiwan, Hong Kong, Macau, mainland China, Malaysia, Indonesia, Thailand and Singapore. Most Taoist temples have lottery poetry to provide religious guidance for believers.

== Practice ==
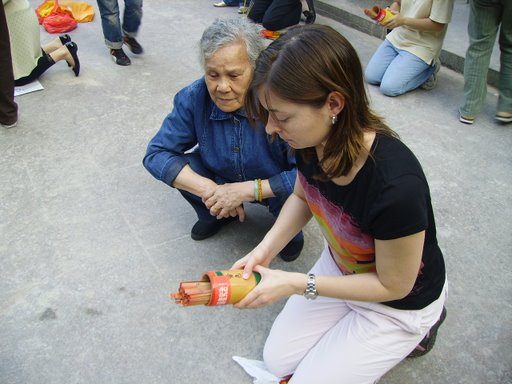
Practicing kau chim at Wong Tai Sin Temple, Hong Kong

The prediction begins with the cup storing a number of the sticks. After the querent has finished their devotions to the main deity, the querent purifies the cylinder by revolving it around the incense burner three times and mixing the sticks by hand. The querent kneels in prayer, holding the cup between their palms and asking their question to the deity, either aloud or by whispering. This part is done decisively, as one should not shift questions or hesitate on the question in the middle of the rite. The shaking of the cylinder, which is usually tipped slightly downward, results in at least one stick leaving the cylinder and being dropped onto the floor. In most cases, if multiple sticks leave the cylinder, those fortunes do not count and must be shaken again. Each stick, with its designated number, represents one answer.

When a single stick falls out, the number will correspond to one of the hundred written oracles with an answer on it. The writing on the piece of paper will provide an answer to the question. In most cases, to confirm the validity of the answer given by the deity, the querent will pick up and toss two jiaobei blocks. Each block is round on one side and flat on the other. A successful answer requires one flat and one round side to be facing up, a failed answer will result in two round sides facing up. Much emphasis is placed on denial when both sides flat are tossed; some legends say when this happens, the deities are laughing at the querent. The querent will have the option to ask for a fortune again until a successful answer can be made.

Following a successful fortune, interpretation may be needed to comprehend the answer. Answers can be interpreted by a temple priest or volunteers or can be self-interpreted by the querent. In many cases, an offering is made prior to the asking of the question in order to carry good favor from the higher powers. These offerings typically consist of incense, fresh fruits, cakes, or monetary donations.

== Alternative tools and practice ==
At places such as the Thean Hou Temple in Kuala Lumpur, the handheld bucket is replaced with a larger container. On the inside at the bottom of the container are protrusions (such as the heads of fixing bolts). To consult the oracle, the querent holds the sticks (sometimes refer to as oracle sticks) in a vertical bundle, raises them a little inside the bucket and drops them while holding them loosely. Any stick that stands proud of the rest (because it is resting on a protrusion, not having bounced off) is considered part of the divined answer.

== Interpretation ==
The stick result is analyzed by an interpreter, who has a book of Chinese poetic phrases and stories. The interpretation is generally short ranged, typically covering no more than one year, using Chinese New Year as the starting point. The interpreter typically charges a small fee. Often, interpreters provide other services such as palm or face reading.

Because the supposed accuracy of the prediction very much depends on the interpreter, some people run the result through a number of different interpreters to see whether similar results are drawn. The interpreted answer is usually a historical Chinese story re-told in modern sense. The story is basically the forthcoming event the querent is about to experience.

In some traditions, the believer draws one lottery and looks for the corresponding poem to the lottery. The poems are written or printed on a piece of paper, usually 12–15 cm (4.7–5.9 in) long and 4 cm (1.6 in) wide, with a Jueju poem on each piece as the answer to the believer from the gods.

== Locale ==
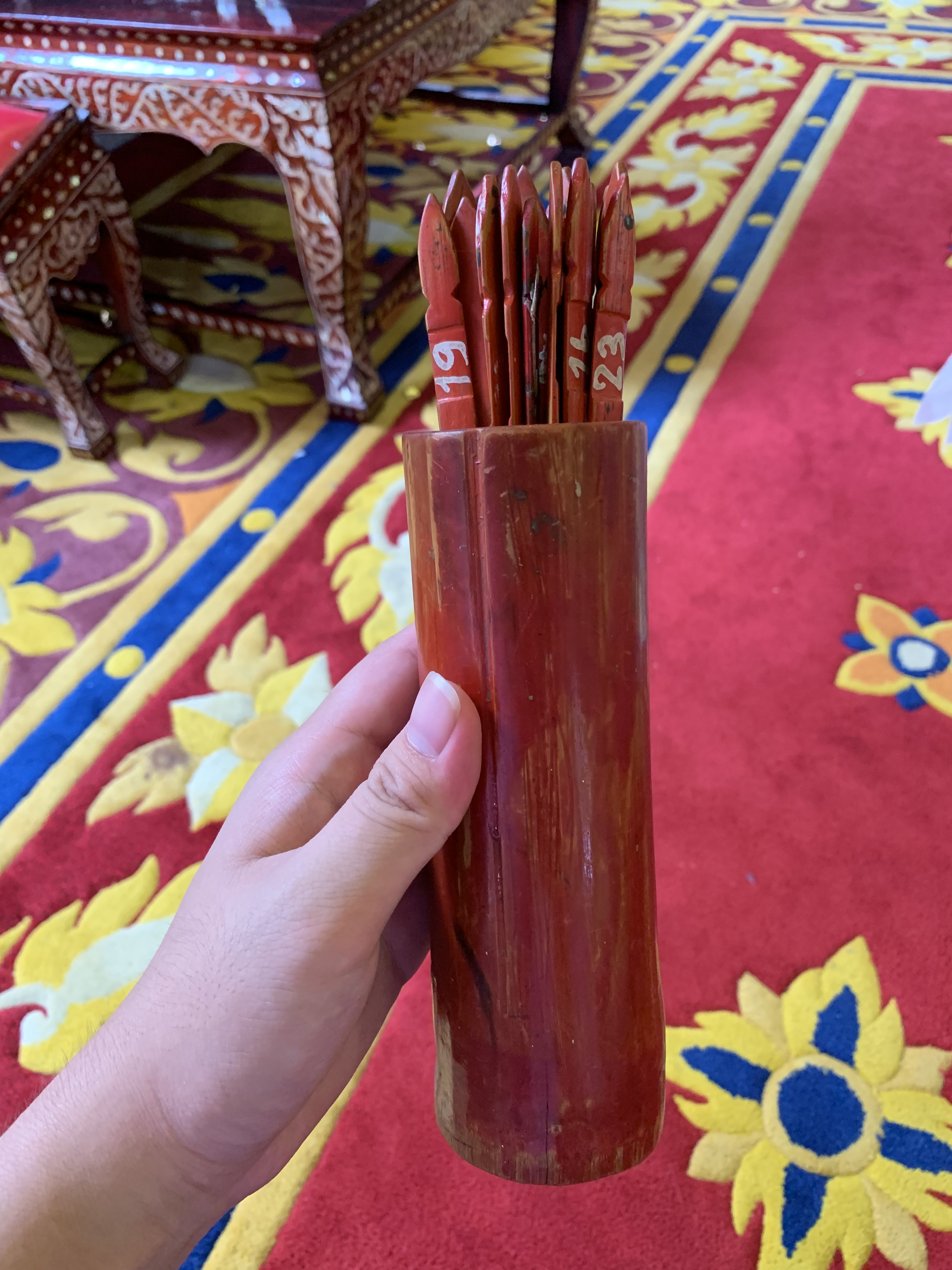
Seam Si at a temple in Thailand

In Hong Kong, the most popular place for this fortune telling practice is the Wong Tai Sin Temple, which draws thousands to millions of people each year.

In Thailand, kau chim is commonly known as seam si (Thai: เซียมซี; alternatively spelled siem si, siem see). It is believed that seam si came to Thailand with the Chinese diasporas and was presumably first introduced at the oldest Chinese temple in Thailand; the Lim Ko Niao Shrine in Pattani Province. The oracles were only available in Chinese until as early as the reign of King Chulalongkorn, where one of the earliest translation of the oracles were printed in Thai by Plean Sae-song (เปลี่ยน แซ่ซ้อง) for Wat Kanlayanamit in Thonburi.

In 1915, kau chim sticks were introduced to the United States under the trade name "Chi Chi Chinese Fortune Teller" by the Pacific Dry Goods Company of San Francisco, California, where a large population of Cantonese Chinese immigrants had settled. The Chi Chi sticks, 78 in number, were made in China of bamboo but they were marked with Arabic numerals instead of Chinese characters, and were packaged in a bright yellow and red chipboard tube with a black lid (like a modern mailing tube). They were accompanied by a rolled-up booklet of 78 rhyming interpretations that fit inside the tube with the sticks.

By the early 1920s, chi chi sticks were available all across America, from several importers and under a variety of trade names, including "Chien Tung Fortune Teller." They were heavily marketed to African American fortune tellers through mail-order catalogs. They fell out of popularity during World War II, but only due to problems with supply, as China had been invaded by Japan and trade routes were disrupted.

In the 1990s, importations of kau chim sticks were available again in the US. This time, packaged in leather-covered tubes painted with ornate Chinese designs, but also with the old rhyming Chi Chi stick booklet so well known to Americans. Meanwhile, Chi Chi sticks of the 1915-1935 era (if all their parts and the booklet are intact) have become artifacts among those who collect fortune telling objects.

The practice of using sticks in Chien Tung may be related to the game of pick-up sticks played today. This theory is based on a Japanese variation, called Mikado, which also has an emperor stick. A form of the game developed in the 16th century and may have been adapted from Chinese culture and religion.

Some Taoist temples in Taiwan and Malaysia also revere a special Medicinal Oracle sticks (藥簽) which the poems are written in the form of Traditional Chinese medicine (TCM) concoction. Visitors can use the poem to buy items from the nearby Traditional Chinese Medicine shop. This was a common practice at certain Baosheng Dadi temples in olden days.

== See also ==
- Drawing straws
- Feng shui
- Fuji (planchette writing)
- Hong Kong Government Lunar New Year kau chim tradition
- Jiaobei
- O-mikuji
- Oracle
- Tangki
- Tung Shing
