= Huaisheng Mosque =

Mosque in Guangzhou, Guangdong, China

- 怀圣寺
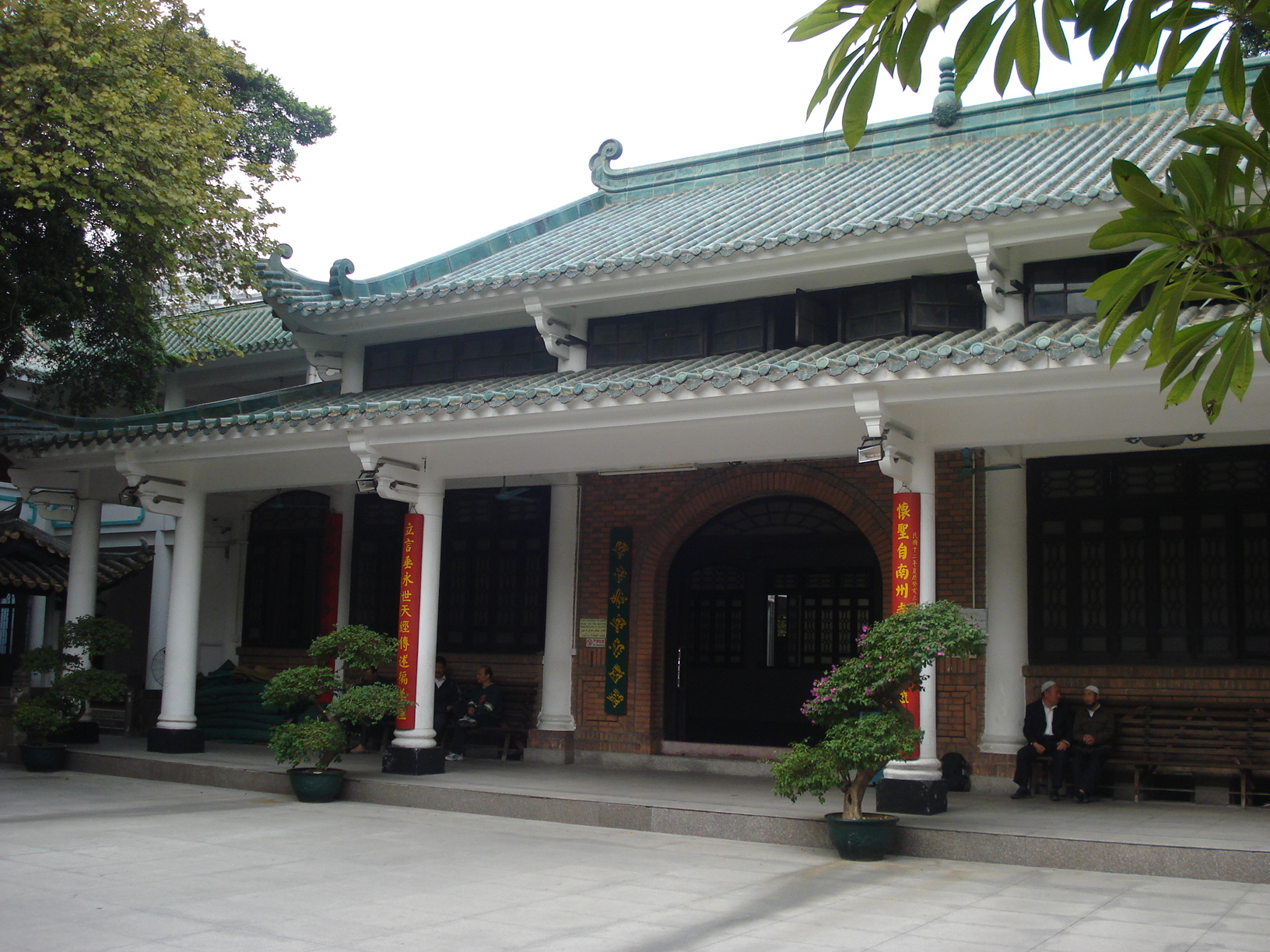

- Location of the mosque in Guangdong

Religion
- Affiliation: Sunni Islam
- Ecclesiastical or organisational status: Mosque
- Status: Active

Location
- Location: 56 Guangta Rd, Yuexiu District, Guangzhou, Guangdong
- Country: China
- Interactive map of Huaisheng Mosque
- Coordinates: 23°7′31″N 113°15′13″E

Architecture
- Type: Mosque
- Completed: Disputed: c. 627 CE; or; Tang or Song dynasties; 1350 and 1695 (rebuilt)

Specifications
- Minaret: 1
- Minaret height: 36 m (118 ft)

Major cultural heritage sites under national-level protection
- Official name: Huaisheng Mosque 怀圣寺光塔
- Type: Cultural
- Criteria: Religion
- Reference no.: 4-85

Huaisheng Mosque
- Simplified Chinese: 广州怀圣寺
- Traditional Chinese: 廣州懷聖寺
Transcriptions
Standard Mandarin
- Hanyu Pinyin: Guǎngzhōu Huái Shèng Sì
Yue: Cantonese
- Jyutping: gwong2 zau1 waai4 sing3 zi6*2

The Huaisheng Mosque (simplified Chinese: 广州怀圣寺; traditional Chinese: 廣州懷聖寺; also known as the Lighthouse Mosque and the Great Mosque of Canton (Note: Other names and romanizations include the Hwai Sun Su Mosque, Huai-Sheng Mosque, Huai-Shang Mosque, Huai-Shang Si Mosque, and the Ying Tong Mosque.)) is the main mosque of Guangzhou, located in the Yuexiu District, in the Guangdong Province of China. Rebuilt many times over its history, some historical texts claim that it was first built in the 7th century, but modern scholarship places its foundation at a later period during the Tang or Song dynasties.

The most unusual feature of the mosque is its pointed 36-metre-high (118 ft) minaret, the Guangta or Kwangtah. Although this meant the "Plain Pagoda" in reference to its unadorned surface, it is also sometimes taken to mean "lighthouse" and gave the mosque its alternate name. Somewhat similar "minimalist" minarets can be seen outside China, e.g. at the Khan's Mosque in Kasimov, Russia.

The mosque was listed as a Chinese major cultural heritage site. This mosque and the Xianxian mosque are both attributed to the Muslim companion (Sahabi) Sa'd ibn Abi Waqqas (c. 595 – 674).

== History ==
Old Chinese Muslim manuscripts say the mosque was built in 627 CE by Sa'd ibn Abi Waqqas, a Companion of the Prophet who supposedly came on to China in the 620s. Although modern secular scholars do not find any historical evidence that Sa'd ibn Abi Waqqas actually visited China, they agree that the first Muslims must have arrived to China within the 7th century, and that the major trade centers, such as Guangzhou, Quanzhou, and Yangzhou, probably already had their first mosques built during the Tang dynasty (r. 618–690), even though no reliable sources attesting to their actual existence has been found. (Note: Lipman notes that, according to Leslie's detailed analysis of both Chinese and West Asian manuscripts, the earliest reliable dates for mosque constructions in China pertain to the Song dynasty (r. 960–1279).)

The minaret measures 36 metres (118 ft) in height and consists of two storeys. It was the tallest building in the city until the beginning of the 20th century. In the Middle Ages, it served various functions, functioning as a lighthouse, a wind vane, and a control tower.

It is very likely that the mosque existed during the early years of the Song dynasty. In 1349, Ramadan ibn Alauddin, the first named Korean Muslim, was buried in the mosque cemetery. The mosque was rebuilt in 1350 then again in 1695 after being destroyed in a fire. The Huaisheng Light Tower or minaret was built at an earlier period. As late as the 19th century, the minaret tower was one of the major landmarks of Guangzhou.

The Tatar traveler Abdurreshid Ibrahim who was an acquaintance of one of the Mosque's ahongs, Wang Kuan, was dismissive of the claim that this mosque was built by Sa'd ibn Abi Waqqas. He called it a peculiar idea:

This history is indisputable to the Chinese and it would seem to be impossible to persuade them that this was not the case ..... Sa’d bin Vakkâs was a famed person among the Noble Companions and the ten companions who were promised Paradise, and his biography is well known to Muslims. If Vakkâs had been an envoy [from the Arabs to China], the great Hadith scholars would have recorded it ... because some of them would have understood that anything that happened in the era of our Prophet Muhammad would have to be written down, without ignoring the slightest detail. If an envoy had been dispatched to China like this, Hadith scholars should have recorded it."

== Transportation ==
The mosque is accessible within walking distance south east of Ximenkou Station of Guangzhou Metro.

== Gallery ==
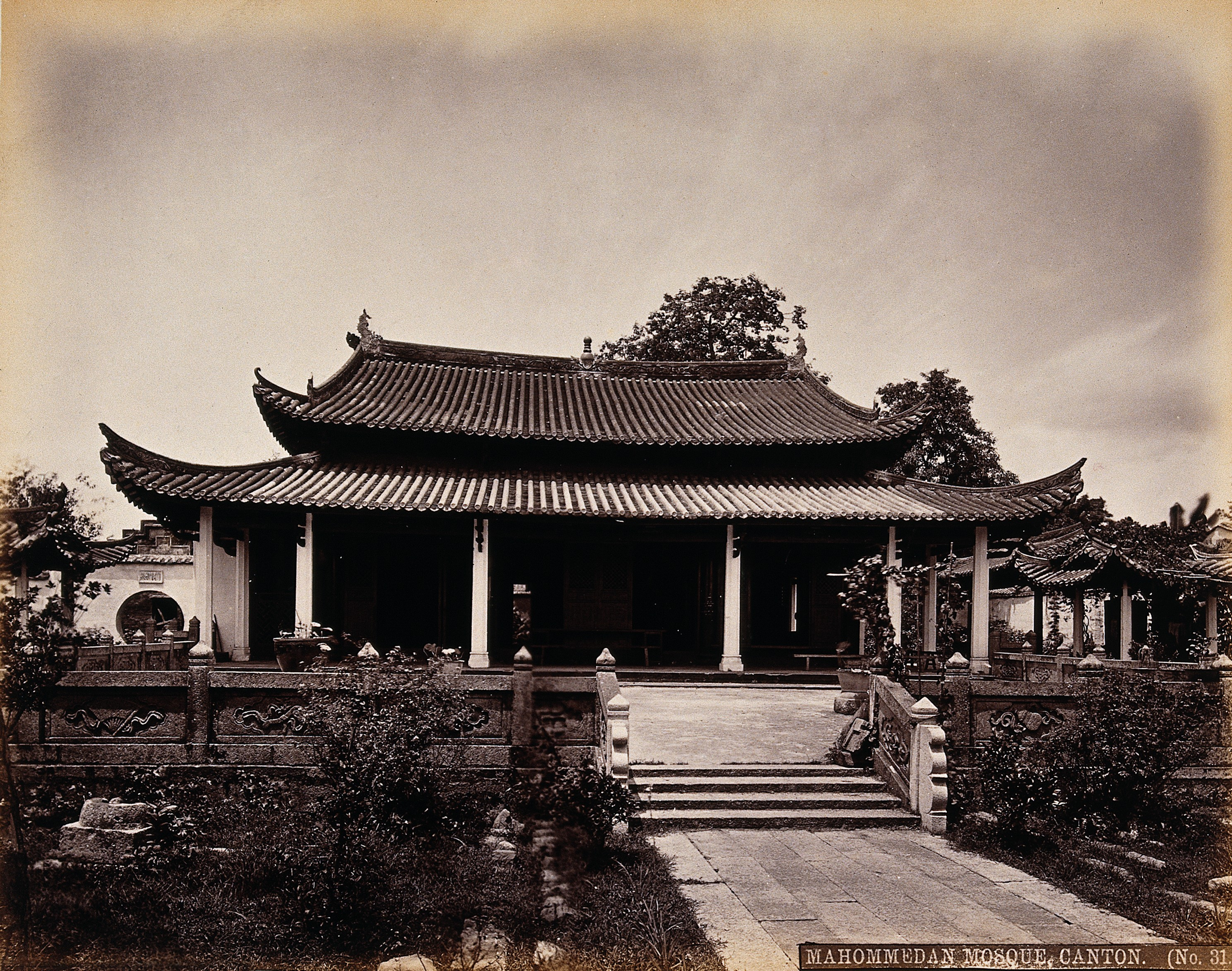
The mosque entrance, c. 1873

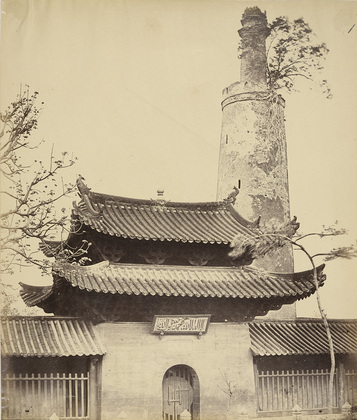
The mosque and minaret, 1860

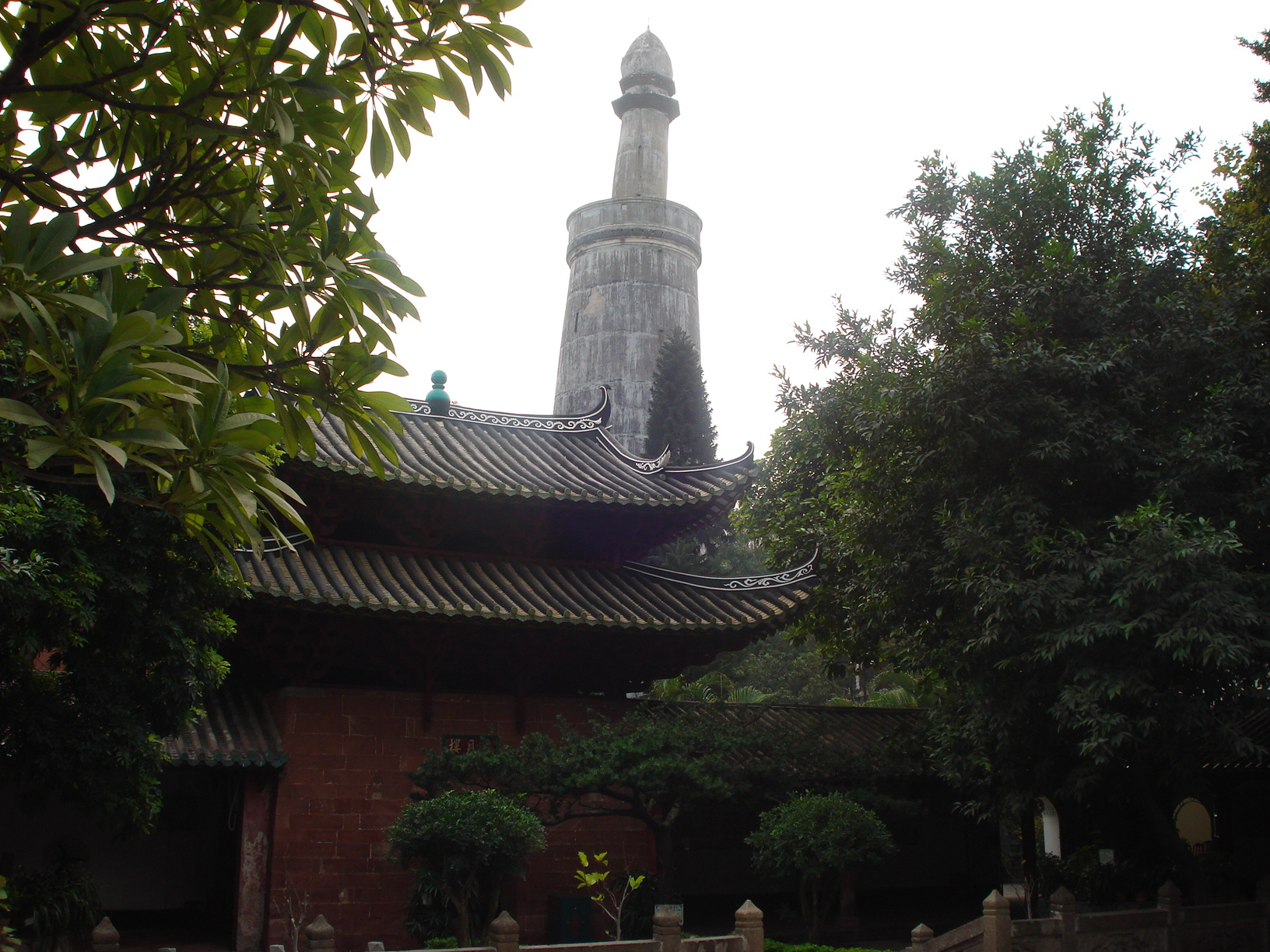
The mosque and minaret, 2007

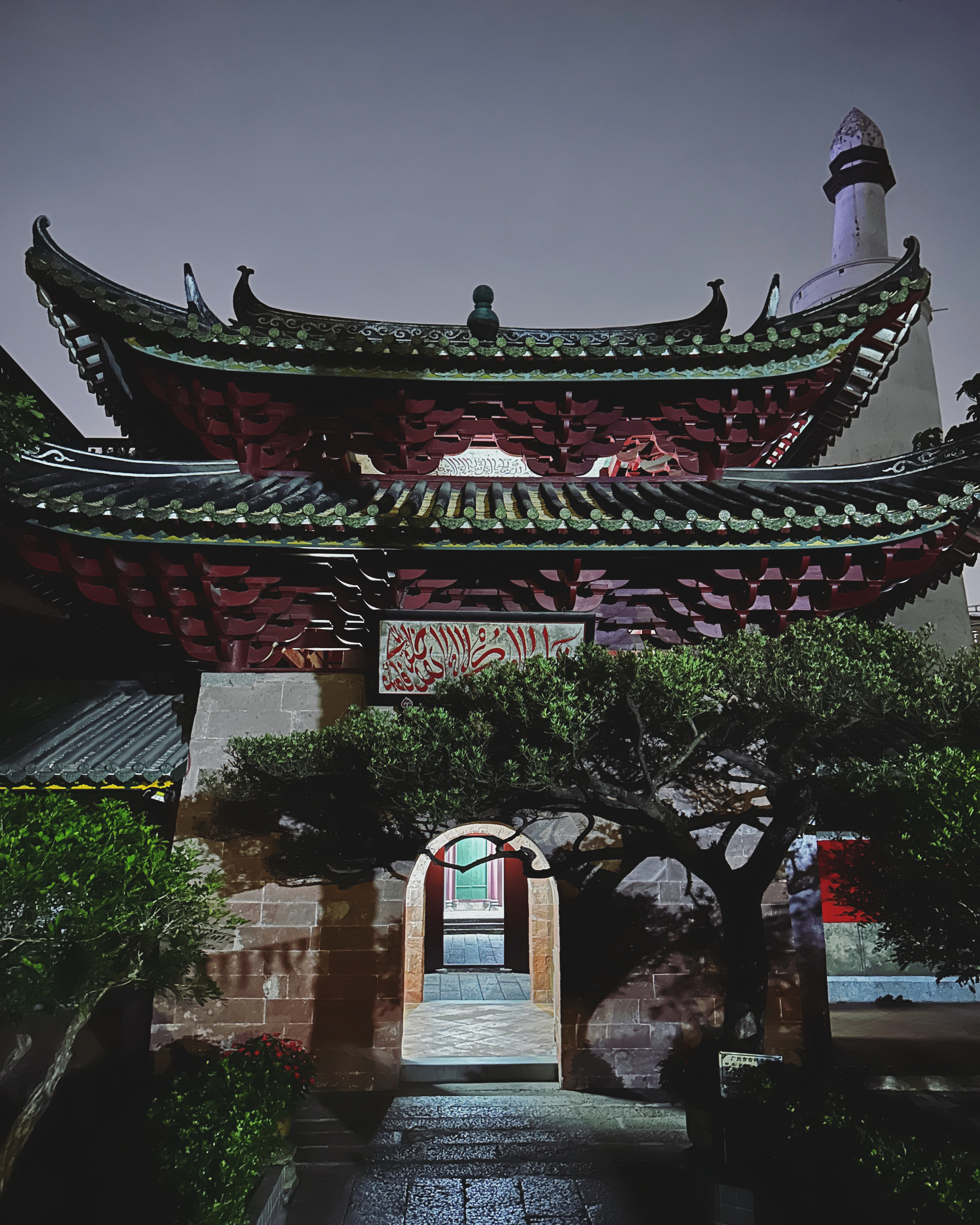
Huaisheng Mosque in night

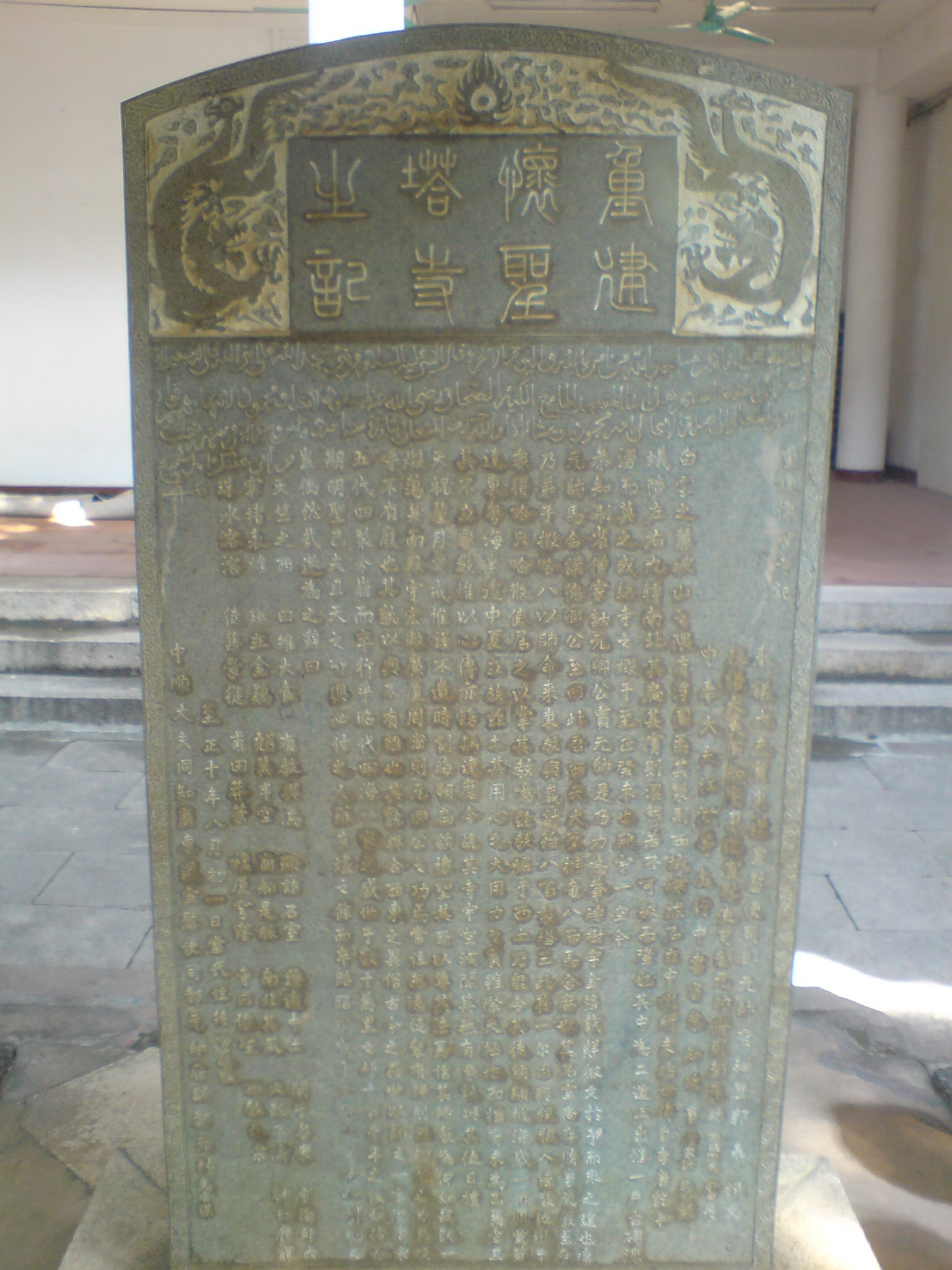
Stele of Reconstruction of the Huaisheng Mosque

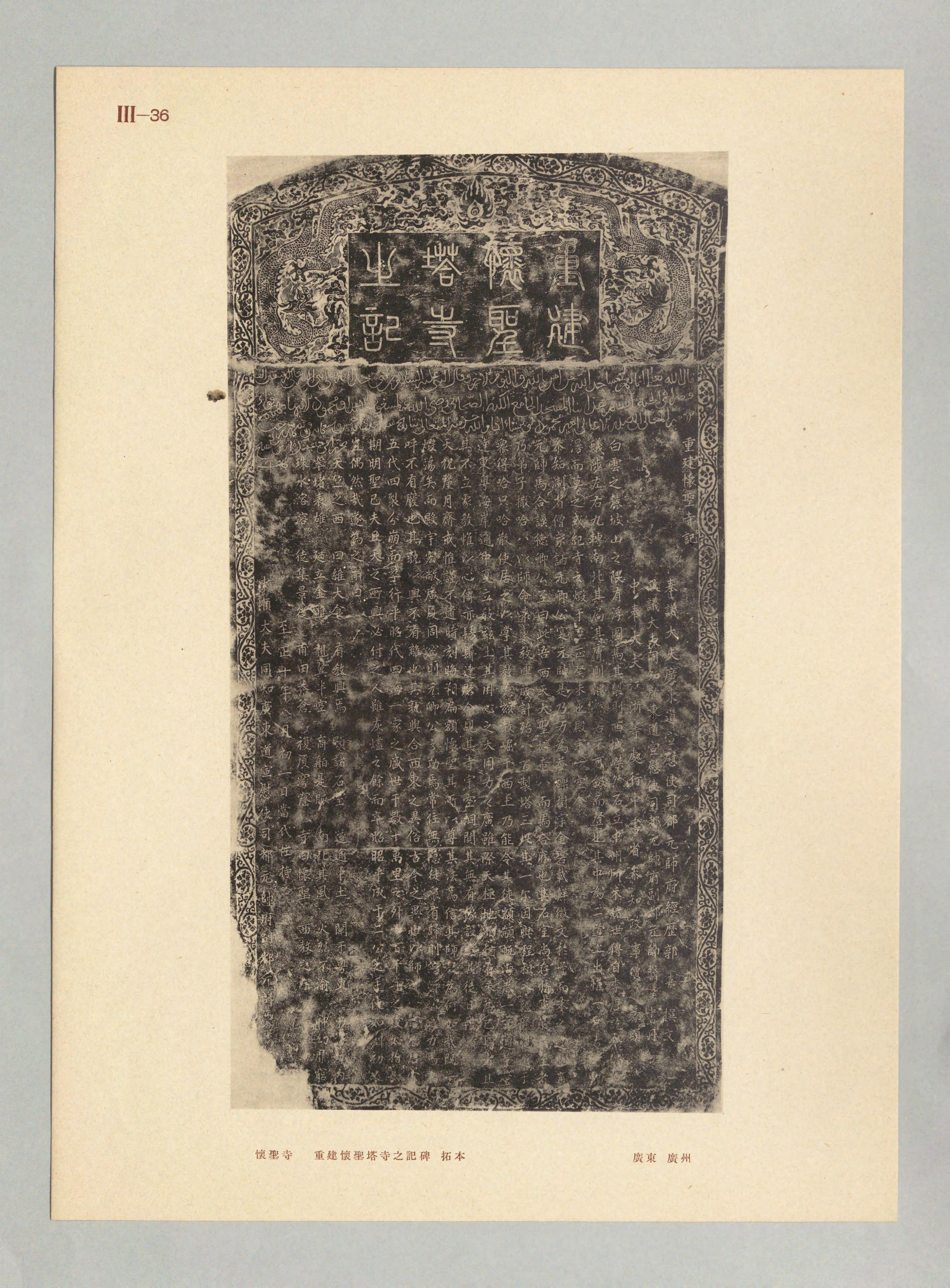
Transcript of the Stele

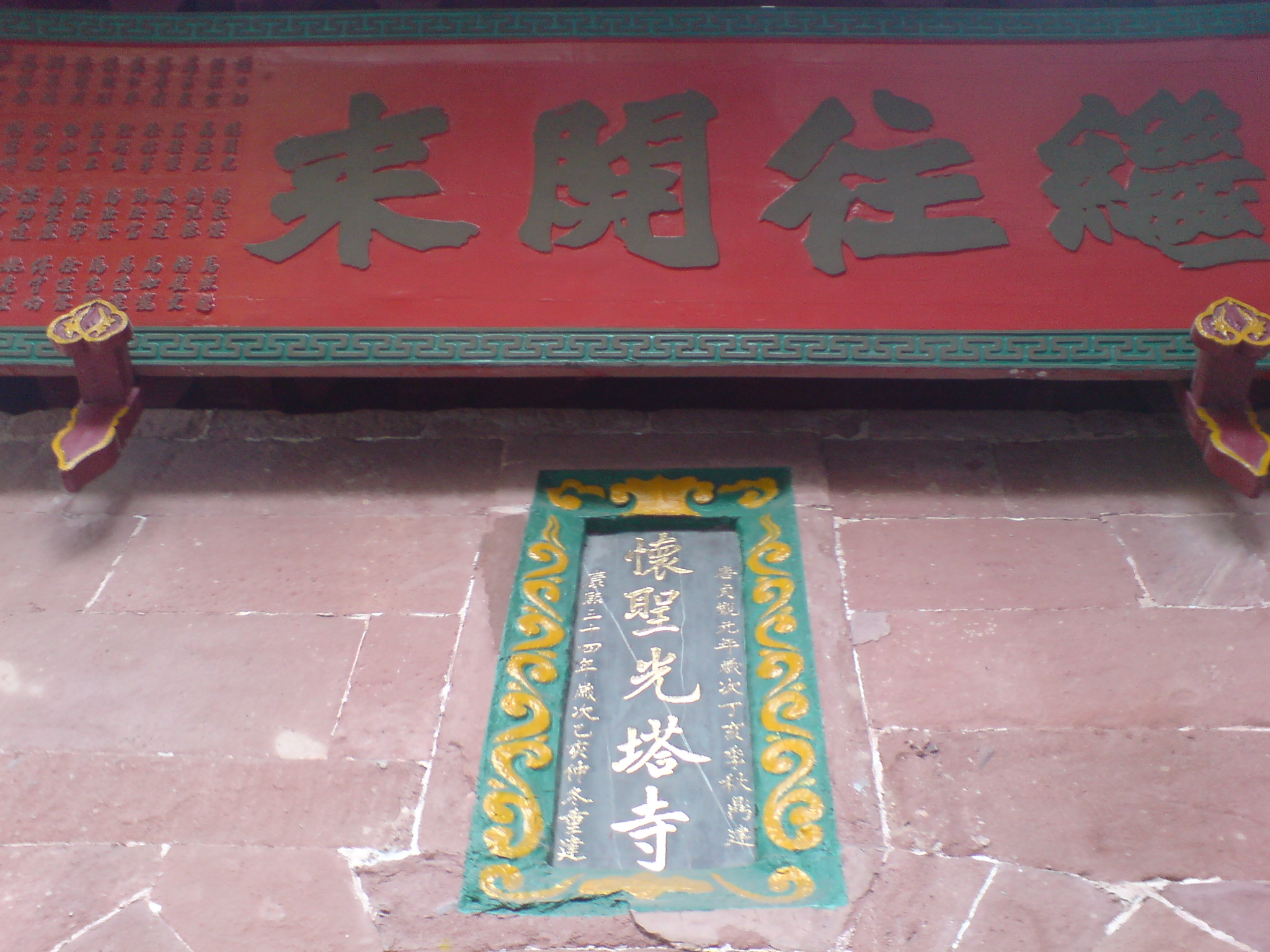
Interior

== See also ==
- Islam in China
- List of mosques in China
- List of Major National Historical and Cultural Sites in Guangdong
