= Chungju Cemetery =

First Muslim cemetery in Modern South Korea

Chungju Muslim Cemetery

Details
- Established: 28 June 2004(complete); August 2004(opened)
- Location: 84 Wapyeong 2-gil, Wapyeong 2-gil, Angseong-myeon, Chungju, North Chungcheong Province, South Korea
- Size: 1,150 pyeong (approx. 3,800 m²)

Korean name
- Hangul: 충주 무슬림 공동묘지
- Hanja: 忠州 무슬림 共同墓地
- RR: Chungju Museullim gongdongmyoji
- MR: Ch'ungju Musŭllim kongdongmyoji

The Chungju Muslim Cemetery (Korean: 충주 무슬림 공동묘지) is the first Muslim cemetery in the South Korea established specifically for observant Muslims. It is located within Jindallae Memorial Park in Angseong-myeon, Chungju, North Chungcheong Province.

== History ==
The need for a Muslim cemetery in South Korea had long been expressed by the local Muslim community. Before the establishment of the Chungju site, Muslims in Korea faced difficulties conducting burials according to their religious laws, as most Korean cemeteries practiced cremation, which is not permitted under islamic law.

Efforts to create a dedicated Muslim burial site began in the early 2000s under the leadership of the Korea Muslim Federation (KMF). Financial challenges initially slowed progress until 2002, when then the Abdul Razak Abdul Ghani expressed interest in the project. Through his diplomatic support, the Qatari government pledged financial assistance, contributing approximately US$500,000 to the cemetery's development.

Construction of the Chungju Muslim Cemetery began in early 2004, and the site was completed on June 28, 2004 (Islamic calendar date:10 Jumada al-Awwal 1425). A dedication ceremony followed shortly after, attended by representatives from the Qatari Embassy, KMF Chairperson Son Ju-young, and officials of Jindallae Memorial Park.

== Development ==
The cemetery was built on a plot measuring 1,150 pyeong (approx. 3,800 sq.meters ), located within the Jindallae Memorial Park complex in Angseong-myeon, Chungju. The site follows Islamic funeral procedures, including:

- Burials oriented toward the Qibla (the direction of Mecca).
- Earth burial rather than cremation.
- Simple gravestones without elaborate decoration.
- Individual burial plots in keeping with Islamic modesty traditions.

According to the KMF, the cemetery aimed to alleviate the significant financial burden of burial on low-income Muslims, as private graves or imported funeral services were previously unaffordable for many Koreans of the Islamic faith.

== Land and legal Status ==
The cemetery land is under a long-term lease agreement in accordance with South Korea's Cemetery and Burial Law. Under this regulation, religious burial grounds in South Korea are leased for 60 years, renewable upon expiration. The Korea Muslim Federation manages the lease in cooperation with Chungju City and Jindallae Memorial Park management systems.

This arrangement ensures that the cemetery remains available for Islamic burials but does not transfer permanent ownership to any organization. Renewal discussions are expected to take place around 2066.

== See also ==
- Islam in South Korea
- Korea Muslim Federation
- Jindallae Memorial Park
- Qatar–South Korea relations
