= Hamid Choi =

South Korean translator, Chairman of Korea Muslim Federation

Dr. Hamid Choi Yong Kil, BA.
- 최영길
- Born: Choi Young-gil; April 24, 1949 (age 77); South Korea
- Other name: Choi Young-gil
- Education: BA in Arabic Language and Literature (Hankuk University, 1975); Islamic University of Madinah; PhD in Islamic Studies (Omdurman Islamic University, 1986)
- Occupations: Professor of Islamic and Arabic Studies; Translator
- Years active: 1980–present
- Employer: Myongji University
- Organization: Korea Muslim Federation (Chairperson)
- Known for: First Korean Muslim to translate the Quran and Sahih al-Bukhari into Korean
- Notable work: 성 꾸란: 의미의 한국어 번역; Korean translation of Sahih al-Bukhari
- Awards: King Abdullah bin Abdulaziz International Award for Translation (2008); King Faisal Prize in Service to Islam (2023); Award for Service to Islam from the Regional Council for Islamic Call in Southeast Asia (2023)

Hamid Choi (Korean: 최영길) is a South Korean translator and professor of Islamic and Arabic studies at Myongji University. Currently serving as chairperson of Korea Muslim Federation (KMF), in 2021 he reportedly became the first Korean Muslim to translate the Quran and Sahih al-Bukhari into Korean language. Choi has also written about ninety articles concerning Islamic studies.

He is awarded laureate of King Faisal Prize in Service to Islam in 2023.

== Early life and education ==
Choi was born in South Korea in 1949. He graduated with a Bachelor’s degree in Arabic Language and Literature from Hankuk University of Foreign Studies in Seoul in 1975. He pursued further Islamic studies at the Islamic University of Madinah before completing his PhD in Islamic Studies at Omdurman Islamic University in Sudan in 1986.

== Career ==
Choi became professor of Islamic and Arabic Studies at Myongji University in Seoul, where he contributed to developing Islamic studies in Korea. He also serves as Chairperson of the Korea Muslim Federation, an umbrella body representing Korean Muslims.

=== Translation of Islamic texts ===
In 1997, Choi completed the first direct Korean translation of the Quran, published as 성 꾸란: 의미의 한국어 번역 (The Holy Qur’an: Korean Translation of the Meanings). The work took nearly seven years and was reviewed by the King Fahd Complex for the Printing of the Holy Qur’an in Saudi Arabia before publication. He later translated Sahih al-Bukhari into Korean, making him the first Korean Muslim to render both texts in his native language.

His Quran translation is widely used in academic and interfaith discussions in Korea, cited in Korean theological literature as a reference text.

== Awards and recognition ==
Choi was awarded the King Abdullah bin Abdulaziz International Award for Translation in 2009 for his contributions to translation studies.

In 2023, he received the King Faisal Prize in Service to Islam for his pioneering translations and service to the Muslim community.

The same year, he was also honored with an award for Service to Islam by the Regional Council for Islamic Call in Southeast Asia.

== Also see ==
- Islam in Korea
- Korea Muslim Federation
