= Seoul Central Mosque =

Mosque in South Korea

- 서울중앙성원 서울中央聖院
- The mosque (2023)

Religion
- Affiliation: Islam
- Branch/tradition: Sunnism
- Ownership: Korea Muslim Federation

Location
- Location: Itaewon, Seoul, South Korea
- Interactive map of Seoul Central Mosque
- Coordinates: 37°32′0″N 126°59′51″E

Architecture
- Type: Mosque

The Seoul Central Mosque (Korean: 서울중앙성원; Arabic: مسجد سول المركزي) is a mosque opened in 1976 in Itaewon, Seoul, South Korea. It is located in Hannam-dong, Yongsan District. It holds lectures in English, Arabic, and Korean. Friday prayers regularly attract between four hundred and five hundred worshipers in the afternoon, though regular attendance has sometimes been known to climb as high as eight hundred people.

== History ==
In the decade or so before the construction of the mosque, the Korean Muslim Federation (originally known as the Korean Muslim Society) held services in a makeshift prayer hall located in the downtown area of Seoul. Fewer than three thousand Muslims were known to be living in Korea at the time.

President Park Chung Hee offered the Korean Muslim Federation land on which to build a proper mosque as a gesture of good will to potential Middle Eastern allies for the still young Republic of Korea. The governments of Saudi Arabia and several other Middle Eastern nations responded by providing funds to aid in the construction of the mosque. Most of the funds came from Saudi Arabia. Within one year of the opening of Seoul Central Mosque, the number of Muslims in Korea rose from less than three thousand to over fifteen thousand. That number rose again sharply to around one hundred fifty thousand with the large influx of foreign workers from Muslim countries such as Pakistan, Bangladesh, and Indonesia in the 1990s. By the 2000s, there were an estimated one hundred thousand Muslims in South Korea (though some estimates suggest there being as many as two hundred thousand).

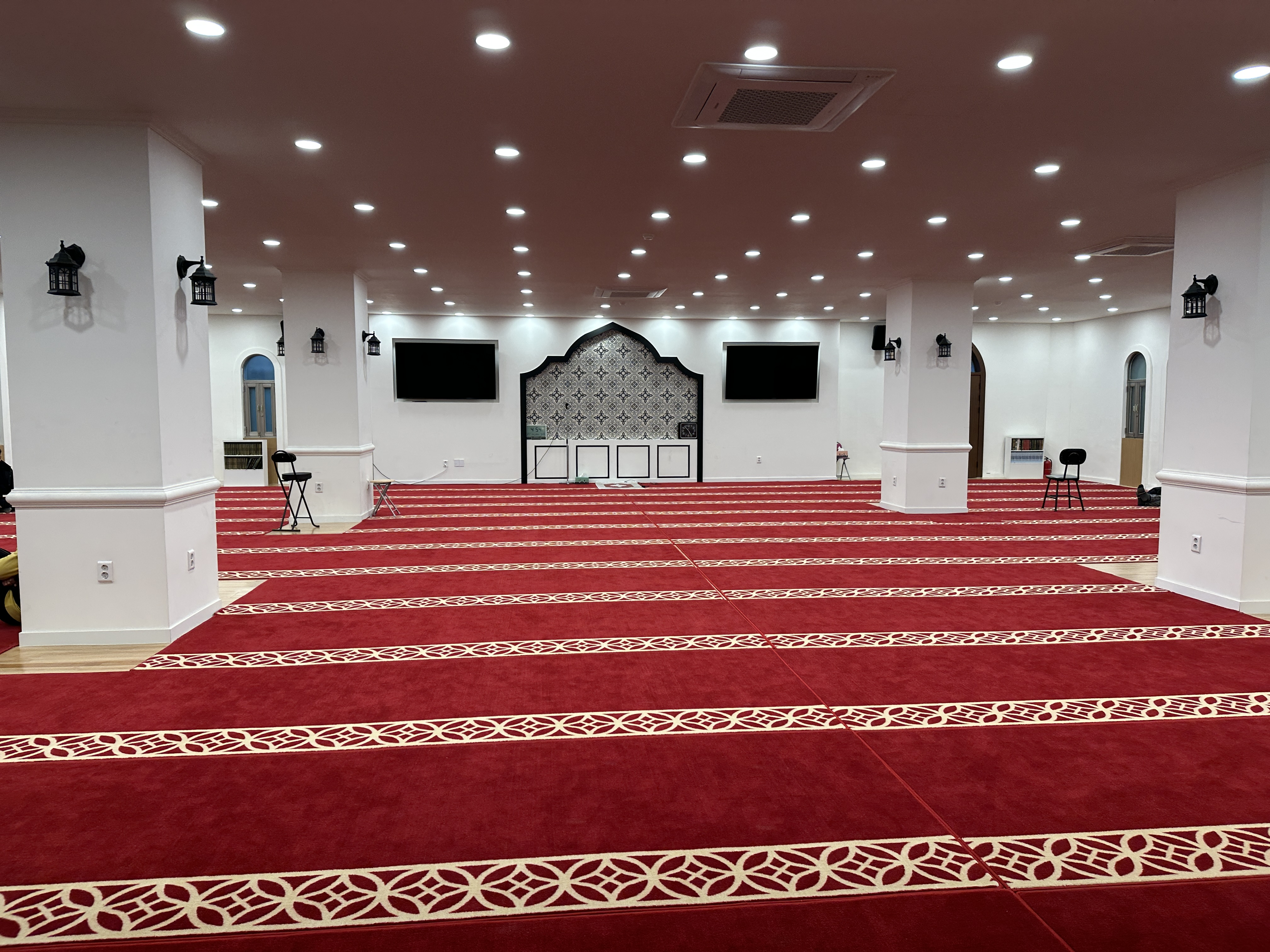
The men's prayer room inside the mosque (2023)

Since the opening of Seoul Central Mosque, seven more mosques have been built throughout Korea. However, Seoul Central Mosque remains the only purpose-built mosque in the Seoul Capital Area and thus it serves as the functional hub of the Islamic cultural community in Seoul. A busy commercial area has developed around the mosque, primarily centered around the sale and preparation of Middle Eastern cuisine and other halal food.

While the 2007 South Korean hostage crisis in Afghanistan was underway, Seoul Central Mosque became the location of several anti-Islamic protests by Christian groups and the recipient of various bomb threats, to the point where a significant increase in police presence was deemed necessary to prevent an attack on worshipers or else on the building itself.

== Architecture ==
A street-level entrance to the mosque, with the Shahada written in Korean: "하나님 외에 다른 신은 없습니다. 무함마드는 그 분의 사도입니다" (2023)

The mosque is also noted for its characteristically Islamic design. The large minarets on the building and the engraved Arabic calligraphy near its entrance are noteworthy in particular as being as out of place among the more standard Korean architecture that makes up the rest of Itaewon.

The wooden mimbar/pulpit of the mosque, from which the Friday sermon is delivered, was donated to the mosque and Muslim community of Korea by King Hassan II of Morocco.

== Imams ==
Name	Tenure	Notes
Sulaiman Lee Haeng-Lae (이행래)	c. 1979 – 2010	One of Korea’s earliest Muslim leaders; documented as Imam in official Islamic publications and interviews in the 1980s–2000s.
Abdur Rahman Lee Ju-Hwa (이주화)	2010 – present	First confirmed Korean-born Imam of the mosque; appointed June 2010.

== Gallery ==

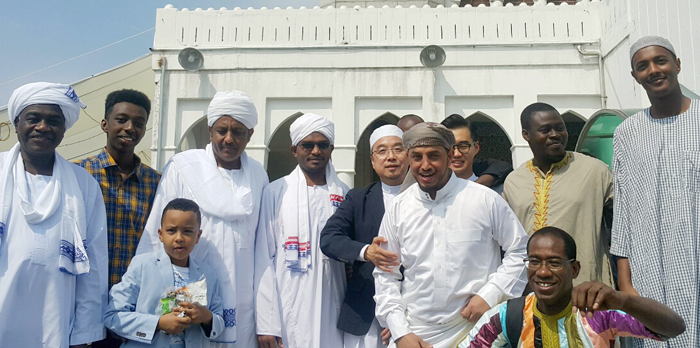

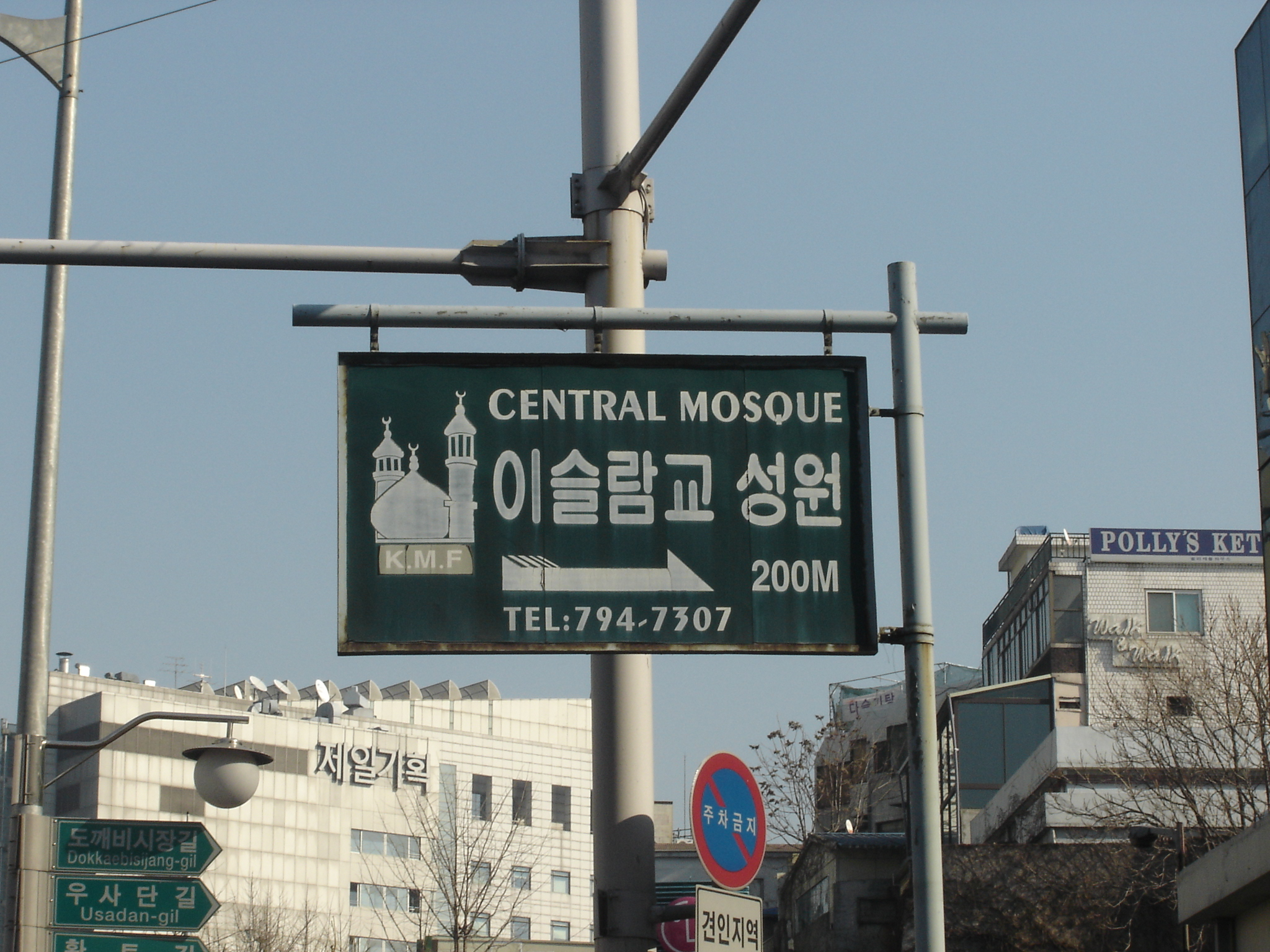

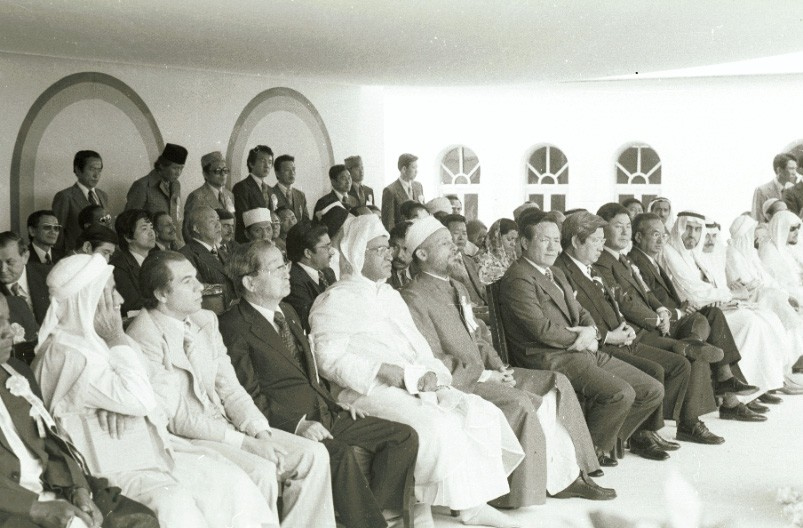

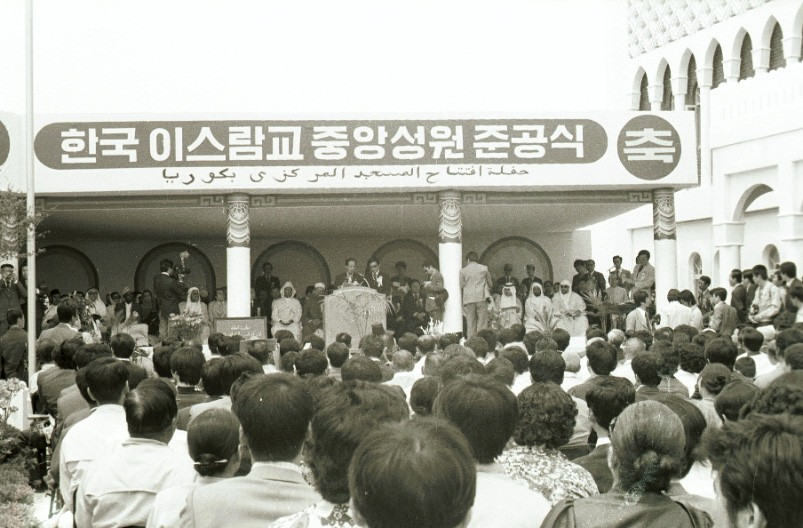

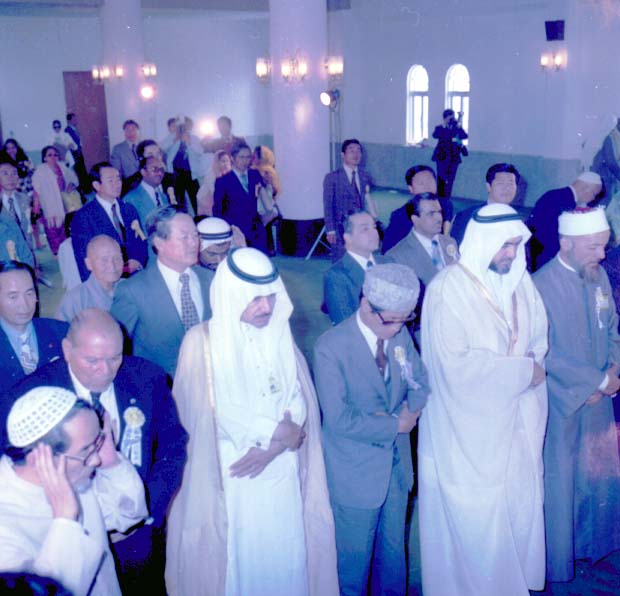

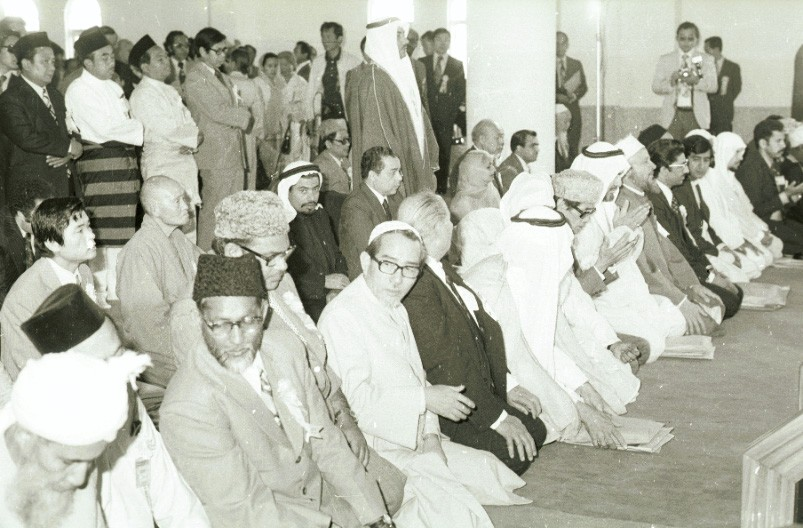

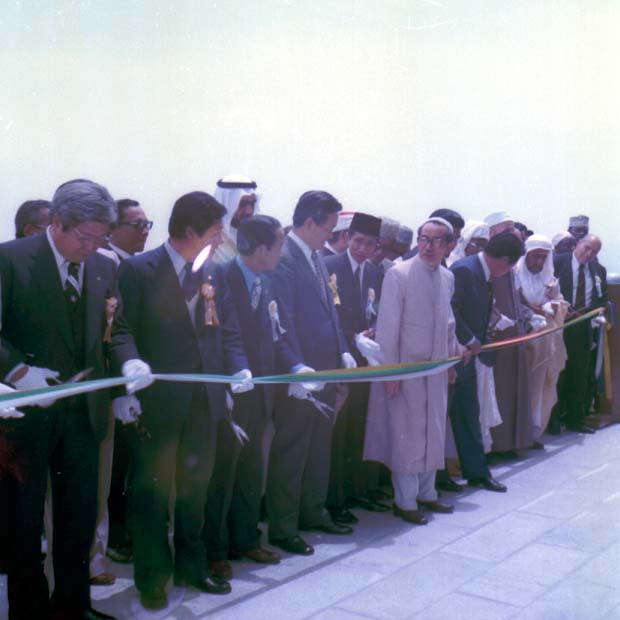

== See also ==
- Islam in Korea
- List of mosques in South Korea
- List of first mosques by country
