= 2007 South Korean hostage crisis in Afghanistan =

2007 hostage crisis in Afghanistan

South Korean hostages photo taken before boarding the plane to Afghanistan

On July 19, 2007, a group of 23 South Korean missionaries were captured and held hostage by members of the Taliban while passing through Ghazni Province of Afghanistan. The group, composed of sixteen women and seven men, was captured while traveling from Kandahar to Kabul by bus on a mission sponsored by the Saemmul Presbyterian Church. The crisis began when two local men, who the driver had allowed to board, started shooting to bring the bus to a halt. Over the next month, the hostages were kept in cellars and farmhouses and regularly moved in groups of three to four.

The Taliban killed two of the abducted South Koreans, Bae Hyeong-gyu, a 42-year-old South Korean the pastor of Saemmul Church, and Shim Seong-min, a 29-year-old South Korean man, on July 25 and 30, respectively. Later, with negotiations making progress, two women, Kim Gyeong-ja and Kim Ji-na, were released on August 13, and the remaining 19 hostages on August 29 and 30.

The release of the hostages was secured with a South Korean promise to withdraw its 200 troops from Afghanistan by the end of 2007. Although the South Korean government offered no statement, a Taliban spokesman claimed that the militant group also received a ransom of US$20 million in exchange for the safety of the captured missionaries.

== Negotiations ==
As South Korea was already scheduled to withdraw its 200 troops by the end of the year, the Taliban's initial demand was only that they hold to this plan, but later also sought the release of 23 Taliban militants from prison in exchange for releasing the abducted South Koreans. The Taliban issued and extended several deadlines for the release of the prisoners, after which they threatened to begin killing the hostages. Freedom for the militants was ruled out when it was apparent the South Korean negotiators could not secure the release of Afghan prisoners, as Afghan president Hamid Karzai had previously faced criticism for freeing five rebel prisoners in exchange for an Italian hostage.

Face-to-face meetings between the Taliban and South Korea began on 10 August, resulting in the release of two female hostages, Kim Ji-na and Kim Gyeong-ja, on 13 August. However on 18 August, a Taliban spokesman said that the talks had failed and the fate of the hostages was being considered.

== Release ==
The freedom of the remaining nineteen hostages (fourteen women and five men) was secured on 28 August with the participation of Indonesia as a neutral country. They were eventually released on the 29 and 30 of August.

After the release, a Taliban official announced that South Korea had paid the Taliban more than US$20 million in ransom for the lives of the hostages. However, South Korea stated that they have made a promise with the Taliban that they would not make any statements about the ransom.

== Response ==
Public gatherings were held in South Korea during the capture to pray for the safety of the hostages. Muslims residing in South Korea also expressed their grief regarding the incident and stated that the acts of the Taliban were against the principles of Islam. Many South Koreans nevertheless held numerous protests and demonstrations outside the Seoul Central Mosque.

On the other hand, many South Koreans were critical of the hostages, as the hostages were conducting Christian missionary service in Islamic Afghanistan despite the Ministry of Foreign Affairs and Trade's repeated warnings that Taliban had plans to kidnap South Koreans in order to free imprisoned militants.

Among those criticising the deal from the government as setting a dangerous precedent were the bishop of Daejeon and chairman of Korea Caritas Lazarus You Heung-sik.

== List of hostages ==
Romanized name	Name in Hangul	Name in Hanja	Gender	Birth year	Status
Bae Hyeong-gyu	배형규	裵亨圭	Male	1965	killed on July 25, 2007
Shim Seong-min	심성민	沈聖珉	Male	1978	killed on July 30, 2007
Kim Gyeong-ja	김경자	金慶子	Female	1970	released on August 13, 2007
Kim Ji-na	김지나	金智娜	Female	1975	released on August 13, 2007
Ryu Gyeong-shik	류경식	柳慶植	Male	1952	released on August 29, 2007
Ko Sei-hoon	고세훈	高世勳	Male	1980	released on August 29, 2007
Lyu Jeong-hwa	유정화	柳貞和	Female	1968	released on August 29, 2007
Lee Seon-yeong	이선영	李善英	Female	1970	released on August 29, 2007
Lee Ji-yeong	이지영	李智英	Female	1970	released on August 29, 2007 (offered to be freed August 13)
Han Ji-yeong	한지영	韓智英	Female	1973	released on August 29, 2007
Lee Jeong-ran	이정란	李貞蘭	Female	1974	released on August 29, 2007
Lim Hyeon-ju	임현주	林賢珠	Female	1975	released on August 29, 2007
Cha Hye-jin	차혜진	車惠珍	Female	1976	released on August 29, 2007
An Hye-jin	안혜진	安惠珍	Female	1976	released on August 29, 2007
Seo Myeong-hwa	서명화	徐明和	Female	1978	released on August 29, 2007
Lee Ju-yeon	이주연	李週妍	Female	1980	released on August 29, 2007
Je Chang-hee	제창희	諸昌熙	Male	1969	released on August 30, 2007
Song Byeong-woo	송병우	宋炳宇	Male	1974	released on August 30, 2007
Seo Gyeong-seok	서경석	徐京石	Male	1980	released on August 30, 2007
Kim Yoon-yeong	김윤영	金允英	Female	1972	released on August 30, 2007
Pak Hye-yeong	박혜영	朴惠英	Female	1972	released on August 30, 2007
Lee Seong-eun	이성은	李成恩	Female	1983	released on August 30, 2007
Lee Yeong-gyeong	이영경	李英慶	Female	1985	released on August 30, 2007

== See also ==
- Foreign relations of South Korea
