= Qizheng Siyu =

Chinese horoscopic astrological system

Qizheng Siyu (Chinese: 七政四餘; pinyin: qī zhèng sì yú), translated variously as Seven Regulators and Four Remainders, Seven Rulers and Four Auxiliaries, or Seven Regulators and Four Shadows, is a Chinese horoscopic astrological system that integrates native Chinese astronomical concepts with astral sciences transmitted from India and the Islamic world. The system tracks eleven celestial bodies: seven "regulators" (Chinese: 七政) comprising the Sun, the Moon, and the five visible planets, plus four "shadow" bodies (Chinese: 四餘) computed from astronomical relationships. Together these eleven bodies are known as the Eleven Luminaries (Chinese: 十一曜; pinyin: shí yī yào).

The system was primarily developed during the Tang dynasty (618–907 CE) and Yuan dynasty (1271–1368 CE), as Chinese practitioners synthesized native astronomical knowledge with astral sciences transmitted via Buddhist textual channels and through Mongol-era cultural exchange with the Islamic world.

== History ==
=== Native Chinese antecedents ===
The system developed on top of an indigenous Chinese observational framework of considerable antiquity. Star names later organised into the twenty-eight mansions (Chinese: 二十八宿; pinyin: èrshíbā xiù) appear on oracle bones excavated at Anyang and dating to the mid-Shang dynasty, and the core of the mansion system had taken shape by the reign of King Wu Ding (1250–1192 BCE). A lacquered clothing chest recovered in 1977 from the Tomb of Marquis Yi of Zeng at Suixian in Hubei bears the full set of twenty-eight mansion names on its lid, showing the scheme to have been complete before 433 BCE.

=== Indian and Buddhist transmission ===
Two of the system's shadow bodies, Rahu and Ketu, were originally an Indian concept, the lunar nodes; together with the seven classical planets they make up the Navagraha, the nine planets of Indian astrology. Foreign astrology of this kind was being applied in China by Buddhist and Daoist clerics during the Tang dynasty.

A key text in this transmission is the Jiuzhi li (Chinese: 九執曆; lit. 'Nine Seizers Canon'), an 8th-century Chinese translation of an Indian astronomical treatise attributed to Qutan Xida (瞿曇悉達), an astronomer of Indian descent serving at the Tang imperial court. The translation, completed in 718, assumed a spherical Earth, a feature that does not appear to have been incorporated into the technical framework of Chinese horoscopy.

The Buddhist monk Amoghavajra (不空三藏, 705–774 CE) further disseminated Indian astral knowledge through translations of Buddhist astral compendia, including treatises on the nakshatra lunar mansions of the Indian tradition and on planetary influences, which established the framework of nine luminaries (Chinese: 九曜; pinyin: jiǔ yào) within Chinese Buddhist practice. This pattern of transmission is corroborated by broader surveys of astronomical material preserved in Chinese translations of the Buddhist canon.

=== Hellenistic and Islamic transmission ===
A parallel channel brought Hellenistic and Persian–Islamic horoscopic methods to China. The Duli Yusi Jing (Chinese: 都利聿斯經), a Chinese adaptation of Western astrological material possibly derived from the tradition of Dorotheus of Sidon, was among the earliest texts to introduce horoscopic birth-chart methodology into the Chinese tradition. Bill M. Mak identifies this text as central to understanding how "Western" astral science, transmitted via Central Asian and Persian intermediaries, shaped the emerging Chinese horoscopic tradition. Jeffrey Kotyk argues that a significant portion of Chinese horoscopy derives from material traced back to Dorotheus, transmitted via Indo-Iranian intermediaries, and that this translation became the foundation for East Asian horoscopy.

During the Tang dynasty, East Syriac Christian (Nestorian) scholars played a documented role in this transmission. The Li family (李氏), Nestorian astronomers active at the Tang court, are associated with the compilation of the Yusi Jing (聿斯經) and related astrological texts.

During the Yuan dynasty (1271–1368), astrological texts in Arabic were brought to China, and Marco Polo reported that the Mongol capital hosted some five thousand astrologers of Christian, Muslim and Chinese backgrounds; government translations of Arabic astrological works, however, appear to have been made only under the following Ming dynasty.

=== Ming and Qing dynasties ===
Horoscopic practice within the Qizheng Siyu framework remained widespread among Ming-dynasty literati. This is exemplified by astrological compendia such as Xingxue dacheng (星學大成) by Wan Minying (萬民英, 1521–1603).

Jesuit astronomers, invited to the Ming and early Qing court, took charge of the Imperial Astronomical Bureau (Chinese: 欽天監; pinyin: Qīntiān Jiān) beginning in 1644 and reformed the official calendar using Tychonic astronomical methods.

== The system ==
=== Seven Regulators ===
The seven regulators (Chinese: 七政; pinyin: qī zhèng) are the seven classical celestial bodies visible to the naked eye, named according to the Five Phases system:

Chinese	Pinyin	Body	Literal meaning
日	Rì	Sun	Sun
月	Yuè	Moon	Moon
金星	Jīnxīng	Venus	Metal Star
木星	Mùxīng	Jupiter	Wood Star
水星	Shuǐxīng	Mercury	Water Star
火星	Huǒxīng	Mars	Fire Star
土星	Tǔxīng	Saturn	Earth Star

=== Four Shadows ===
The four shadows or remainders (Chinese: 四餘; pinyin: sì yú) are bodies not directly observable but computed from astronomical relationships. Two derive from the Indian Navagraha tradition, and two are virtual bodies calculated from fixed cycles:

Chinese	Pinyin	Name	Description
羅睺	Luóhóu	Rahu	Descending lunar node; derived from Indian Rāhu
計都	Jìdū	Ketu	Ascending lunar node (interpretations vary); derived from Indian Ketu
月孛	Yuèbó	Lunar Apogee	The lunar apogee, the point in the Moon's orbit farthest from Earth
紫炁	Zǐqì	Ziqi	A calculated virtual body determined by a fixed cycle and reference point, without a direct correspondence to a single observable orbital phenomenon

== See also ==
- Chinese astrology
- Chinese astronomy
- Chinese fortune telling
- Huihui Lifa
- Zi wei dou shu
