= Xianxian Mosque =

Mosque in Guangzhou, Guangdong, China

- 先贤清真寺
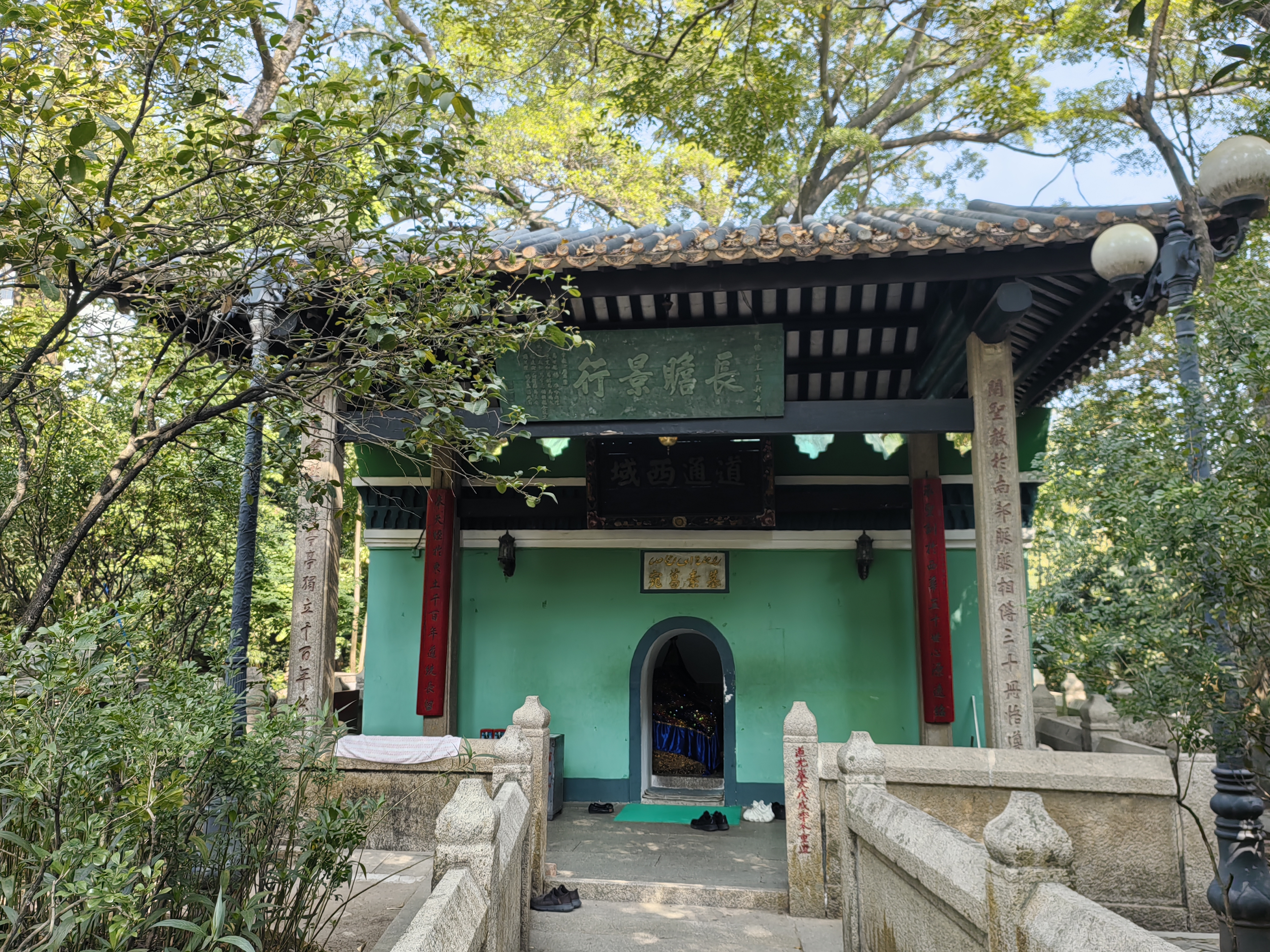

- Location of the mosque in Guangdong

Religion
- Affiliation: Sunni Islam
- Ecclesiastical or organisational status: Mosque
- Status: Active

Location
- Location: 901 Jiefang North Road, Yuexiu, Guangzhou, Guangdong
- Country: China
- Interactive map of Xianxian Mosque
- Coordinates: 23°08′45″N 113°15′39″E

Architecture
- Type: Mosque
- Completed: c. 7th century CE

Specifications
- Capacity: 1,000 worshipers
- Interior area: 1,077 m^{2} (11,590 sq ft)
- Dome: 1
- Site area: 1,860 m^{2} (20,000 sq ft)

The Xianxian Mosque (Chinese: 先贤清真寺) is a mosque in Yuexiu District, Guangzhou City, Guangdong Province, China. It is the largest mosque in Guangzhou.

This mosque and the Huaisheng mosque are both attributed to the Muslim companion (Sahabi) Sa'd ibn Abi Waqqas (c. 595 – 674).

== History ==
The mosque was originally built during the Tang dynasty (r. 618–690 CE). It is also called the Hui-hui cemetery as it was a cemetery honoring 40 famous Arabic Muslim missionaries who were buried there.

== Architecture ==
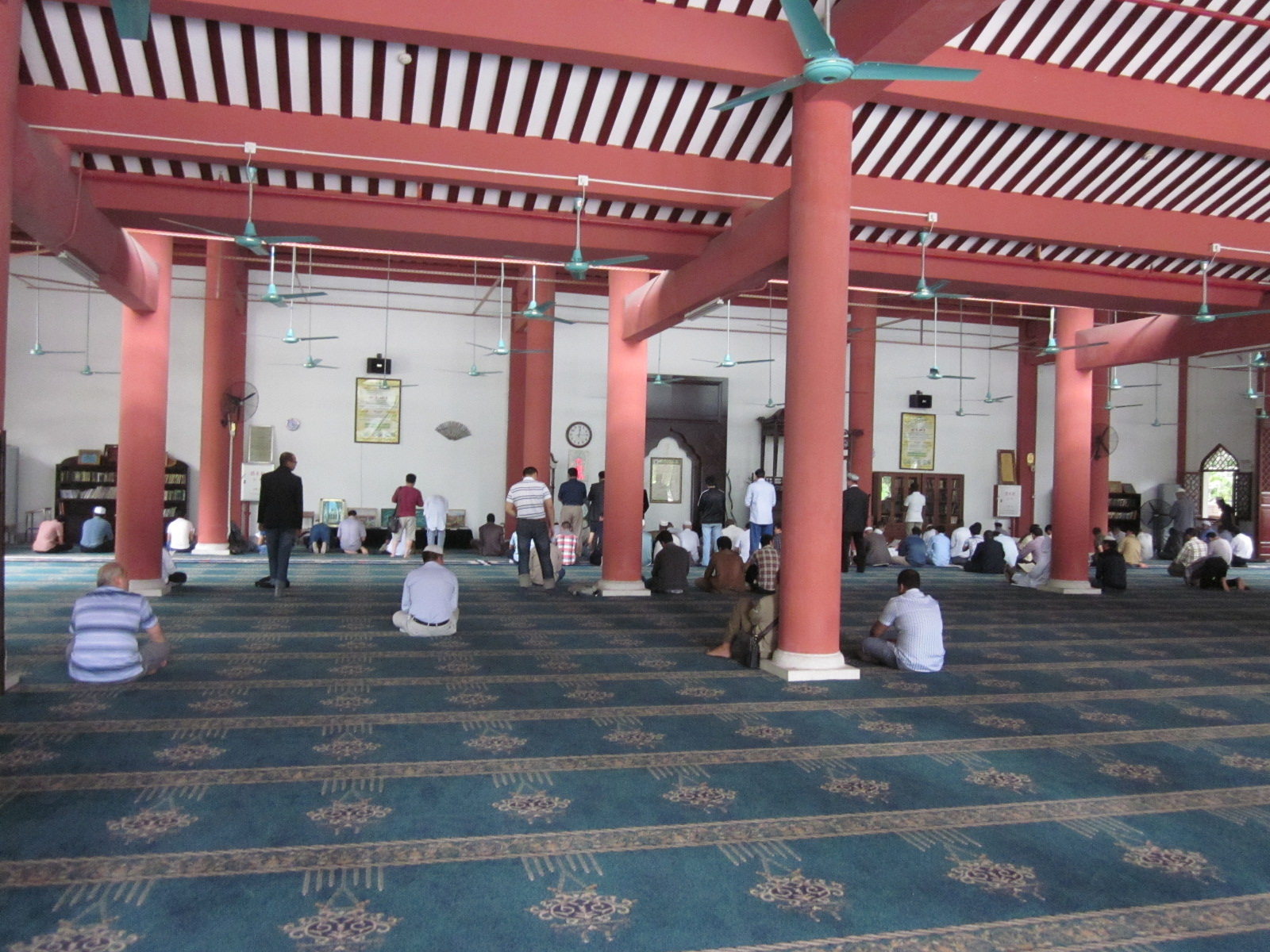
The mosque prayer hall

The mosque was built with Ming dynasty architecture style and covers an area of 1,860 square metres (20,000 sq ft) including the 1,077 square metres (11,590 sq ft) of constructed area. It consists of prayer hall, pavilion, wing room and other facilities. The prayer hall is a two-story building capable of accommodating 1,000 worshipers.

The interior has a garden style look, with many trees and flowers inside the mosque. The cemetery is located on the roof.

== Transportation ==
The mosque is accessible within walking distance east of Guangzhou railway station.

== See also ==
Xianxian Mosque
- Traditional Chinese: 先賢清真寺
- Simplified Chinese: 先贤清真寺
Transcriptions
Standard Mandarin
- Hanyu Pinyin: Xiānxián Qīngzhēnsì
Yue: Cantonese
- Jyutping: sin1 jin4 cing1 zan1 zi6*2

- Islam in China
- List of mosques in China
