= Ramadan ibn Alauddin =

Yuan darughachi (governor) of Luchuan Prefecture in Rongzhou, Guangxi Province

- Born: 1312 or January 1313 (Note: The epitaph states that Ramadan was thirty-eight in East Asian age reckoning in April 1349, meaning that he was born between 8 February 1312, and 27 January 1313. Lee Hee-soo speculates that his name may imply that he was born in the holy month of Ramadan, which was between 31 December 1312 and 29 January 1313 (for AH 712).); Korea?
- Died: 11 April 1349 (aged 36–37); Rongzhou, Guangxi Province
- Other names: 剌馬丹; Lámǎdān
- Occupation: Darughachi
- Known for: Being the earliest named Muslim from Korea

Ramadan ibn Alauddin (1312―April 11, 1349, رمضان ابن علاء الدين Ramaḍān ibn Alāʼ ud-Dīn) was a Yuan darughachi (governor) of Luchuan Prefecture in Rongzhou, Guangxi Province, of Muslim faith and Korean provenance. He served until his death in 1349. His existence is known only from an epitaph in the cemetery of the Huaisheng Mosque in Guangzhou. Ramadan is notable for being the first named Muslim from Korea, although it is unclear whether he was of Korean ethnicity.

== Historiography and popularization ==
The first academic publication to discuss Ramadan, a Muslim from fourteenth-century Korea, was a 1989 paper about Islamic epitaphs at Guangzhou by the Chinese historians Yang Tang and Jiang Yongxing. The existence of Ramadan became popularized in South Korea in 2005, when the daily newspaper Hankook Ilbo published a story about Son Sang-ha, then ambassador-at-large of the country, visiting Guangzhou to see a replica of Ramadan's epitaph. In 2006, KBS, South Korea's national public broadcaster, produced a documentary about Islam in medieval Korea centering on Ramadan.

== Epitaph ==
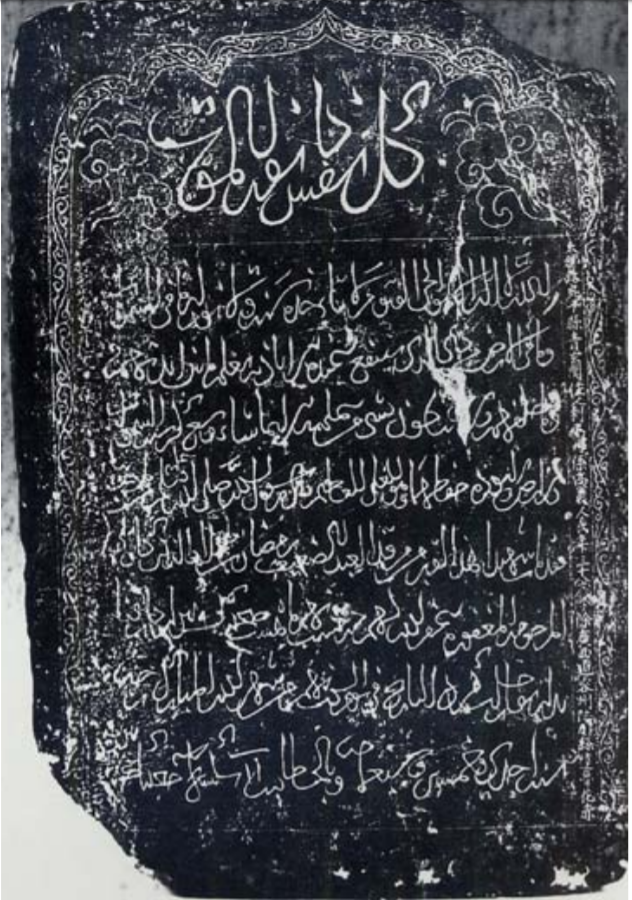
Epitaph of Ramadan ibn Alauddin

The life of Ramadan is known only from his epitaph in the cemetery of the Huaisheng Mosque in Guangzhou, China, originally located close to the grave said to be of Sa'd ibn Abi Waqqas, a Companion of the Prophet Muhammad believed to have died in China. The epitaph has currently been moved inside the Huaisheng Mosque building. The text is bilingual, with Arabic in the center and Classical Chinese written in small characters in the margins.

The Arabic inscription is typical of Islamic funerary epitaphs. It uses a phrase from the Quranic verse 3:185, "Every soul will taste death," as its title. The inscription continues with the well-known Throne Verse, quoted in full, then adds a few details about Ramadan himself:

The Messenger of God said long ago, "He who dies in a foreign land dies as a martyr." (Note: A hadith or saying of the Islamic Prophet Muhammad; considered da'if ("weak") in Book 6, entry 1681 of the collection Sunan ibn Majah.)

This grave is where Ramaḍān ibn Alāʼ ud-Dīn, having died, has returned. May God forgive him and have mercy upon him and [illegible].

[illegible] who has visited Aleppo writes in the date of Rajab [illegible] in the year 751, blessed by God.

The accompanying Chinese text gives Ramadan's address, occupation, and dates of death and burial.

Ramadan [剌馬丹 Lámǎdān], occupant of Qingxuangguan at Wanping Prefecture in Dadu Circuit, was a Korean. He was thirty-eight years old (Note: In East Asian age reckoning) and had then been appointed as darughachi at Luchuan Prefecture in Rongzhou, Guangxi Province. He passed away on the twenty-third day of the third month of the ninth year of Zhizheng [April 11, 1349]. He was buried on the eighteenth day of the eighth month [September 30] at Guihuagang by the Liuhua Bridge at Chengbei, Guangzhou [location of the Muslim cemetery]. An epitaph was raised.

According to the Chinese text, Ramadan died in April 1349, but was buried in the current location of his grave only in September. The Islamic month Rajab 751 AH, which the Arabic text is dated to, corresponds to September 1350 CE, (Note: 4 September to 3 October 1350) a full year later. It thus appears that the grave's current location is the result of a reburial, and that the current epitaph was itself written a year after the reburial.

== Identity ==
Ramadan appears to have been a figure of some prominence. Not only did he serve as a darughachi or provincial governor for the Mongol Yuan dynasty that then ruled China, he had a residence near Dadu (modern Beijing), the Yuan imperial capital. He was also considered sufficiently important by the local Muslim community to be reburied near Sa'd ibn Abi Waqqas, the legendary founder of Islam in China, and to be commemorated by a personally signed epitaph including multiple Quranic verses.

Whether Ramadan was ethnically Korean is unknown. After the Mongol conquest of Korea in the thirteenth century, many Central Asian Muslims (called semu) entered the country—then ruled by the Goryeo dynasty as Mongol vassals—to serve in the Mongol and Korean administrations or to engage in commerce. These Muslims established a local community in the Korean capital of Kaegyong, where they constructed a mosque and enjoyed significant cultural and religious autonomy until a royal decree ordering forcible assimilation was passed in 1427. As the Mongols frequently appointed semu but rarely ethnic Koreans as local governors, Ramadan may have been a Muslim of Central Asian (perhaps Uyghur) ethnicity who was simply born or had settled in Korea. As Rongzhou was a center of trade with Trần Vietnam, historian Lee Hee-soo speculates that Ramadan may have been an international semu merchant based in Korea who was hired by the Yuan.

On the other hand, Ramadan's residence was at Wanping Prefecture, a suburb of Dadu where there was a large ethnic Korean diaspora community in the fourteenth century. The Mongols sometimes classified Koreans as semu as well and occasionally did appoint them as officials and governors. It is thus possible that Ramadan was an ethnic Korean who (or whose father) had converted to Islam and adopted a Muslim name.

== See also ==
- Islam in Korea
