= Huihui Lifa =

Set of astronomical tables

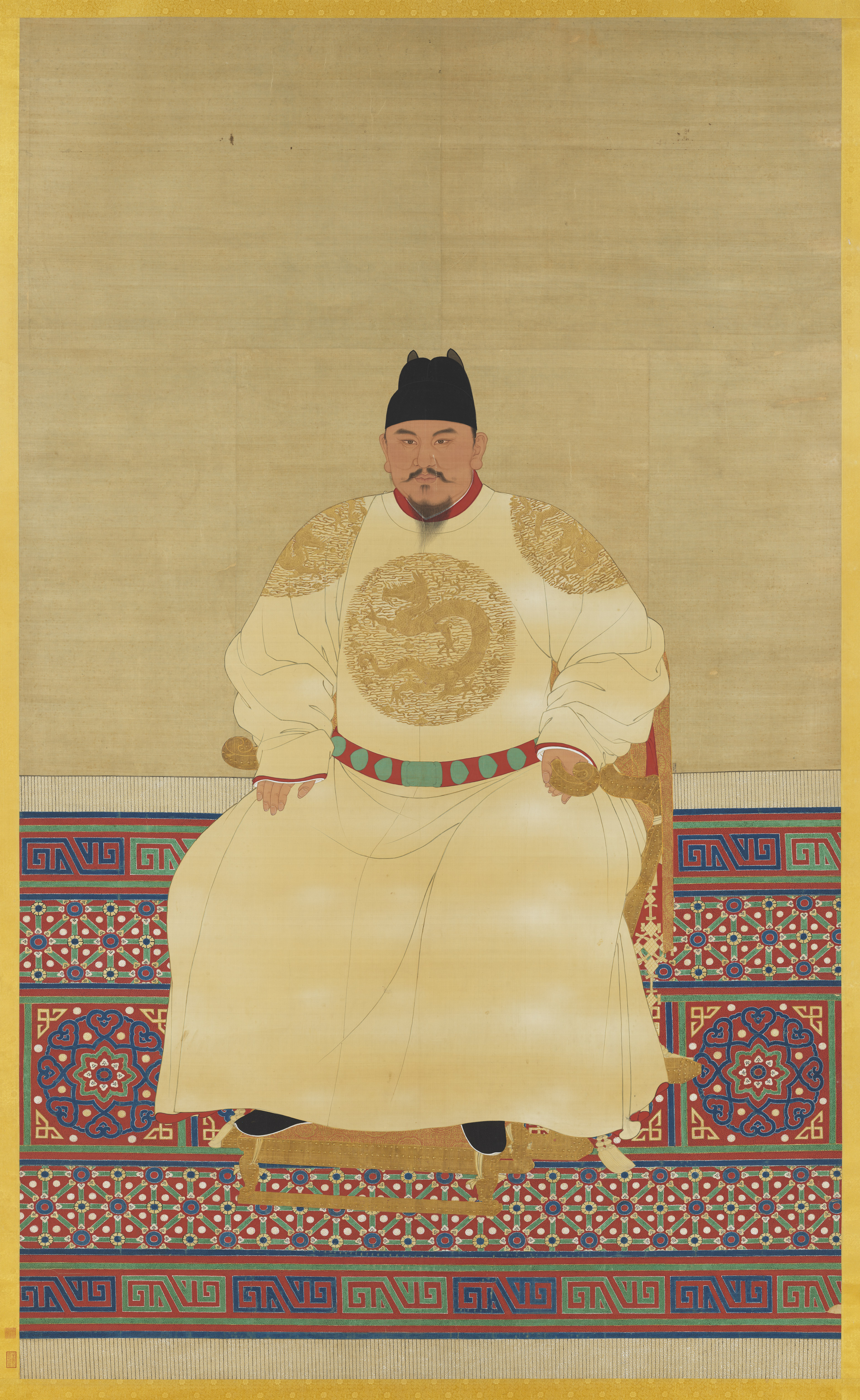
Portrait of the Hongwu Emperor (ruled 1368–98)

The Huihui Lifa (Traditional Chinese: 回回歷法; Simplified Chinese: 回回历法; pinyin: Huíhuí Lìfǎ) was a set of astronomical tables published throughout China from the time of the Ming Dynasty in the late 14th century through the early 18th century. The tables were based on a translation into Chinese of the Zij (Islamic astronomical tables), the title Huihui Lifa literally meaning "Muslim System of Calendar Astronomy".

== History ==
Around 1384, during the Ming Dynasty, Hongwu Emperor ordered the Chinese translation and compilation of Islamic astronomical tables, a task that was carried out by the scholars Mashayihei (مشایخ), a Muslim astronomer, and Wu Bozong, a Chinese scholar-official.

These tables came to be known as the Huihui Lifa (Muslim System of Calendrical Astronomy), and were published in China a number of times until the early 18th century, despite the fact the Qing Dynasty had officially abandoned the tradition of Chinese-Islamic astronomy in 1659.

== Study of the Huihui Lifa in Korea ==
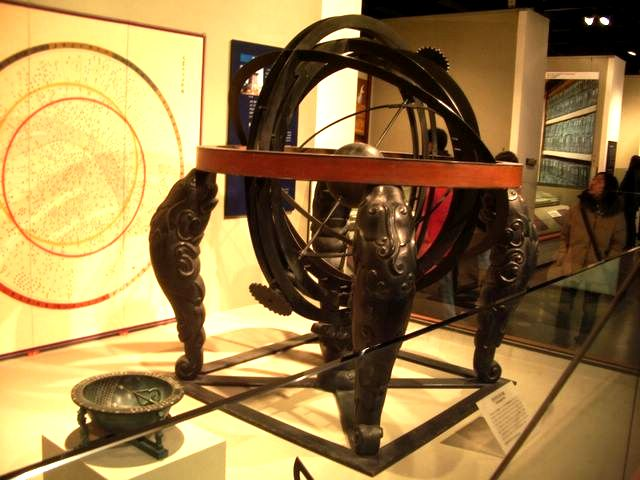
Korean celestial globe based on the Huihui Lifa.

In the early Joseon period, the Islamic calendar served as a basis for calendar reform owing to its superior accuracy over the existing Chinese-based calendars. A Korean translation of the Huihui Lifa was studied in Korea under the Joseon Dynasty during the time of Sejong in the 15th century. The tradition of Chinese-Islamic astronomy survived in Korea until the early 19th century.

== See also ==
- Chinese astronomy
- Islamic astronomy
- Ming dynasty
- Qizheng Siyu
