= Islam in Korea =

Islam (Korean: 이슬람교) is a minor religion in South Korea and North Korea. The Muslim community is centered in Seoul, Busan and Pyongyang. According to the Korea Muslim Federation, there are about 200,000 Muslims living in South Korea, and about 70 to 80 percent are settled foreigners, whereas North Korea hosts a negligible foreign Muslim population, presumably including Indonesian and Iranian diplomats. Seoul has 40% of South Korea's total Muslim population. The Ministry of Foreign Affairs has hosted an Iftar dinner during the month of Ramadan every year since 2004.

== History ==
=== Early history ===
During the middle to late 7th century, Muslim traders had traversed from the Caliphate to Tang China and established contact with Silla, one of the Three Kingdoms of Korea. In 751, a Chinese general of Goguryeo descent, Gao Xianzhi, led the Battle of Talas for the Tang dynasty against the Abbasid Caliphate but was defeated. The earliest reference to Korea in a non-East Asian geographical work appears in the General Survey of Roads and Kingdoms by Istakhri in the mid-9th century.

The first verifiable presence of Islam in Korea dates back to the 9th century during the Unified Silla period with the arrival of Arab navigators and traders. According to numerous Muslim geographers, including the 9th-century Muslim Persian explorer and geographer Ibn Khordadbeh, many of them settled down permanently in Korea, establishing Muslim villages. Some records indicate that many of these settlers were from Iraq. Korean records suggest that a large number of the Muslim foreigners settled in Korea in the 9th century CE led by a man named Hasan Raza. Further suggesting a Middle Eastern Muslim community in Silla are figurines of royal guardians with distinctly Persian characteristics. In turn, later many Muslims intermarried with Koreans. Some assimilation into Buddhism and Shamanism took place owing to Korea's geographical isolation from the Muslim world.

In 1154, Korea was included in the Arab geographer Muhammad al-Idrisi's world atlas, Tabula Rogeriana. The oldest surviving Korean world map, the Gangnido, drew its knowledge of the Western Regions from the work of Islamic geographers.

==== Goryeo period ====
According to local Korean accounts, Muslims arrived to the peninsula in the year 1024 during the Goryeo kingdom. A group of some 100 Muslims, including Hasan Raza (Yeollaja), came in September of the 15th year of Hyeonjong of Goryeo and another group of 100 Muslim merchants came the following year.

Trade relations between the Islamic world and the Korean peninsula continued in the succeeding kingdom of Goryeo. As a result, a number of Muslim traders from the Near East and Central Asia settled down in Korea and established families there. Some Muslim Hui people from China also appear to have lived in the Goryeo kingdom.

With the Mongol armies came the so-called Saengmogin (Chinese: 色目人), this group consisted of Muslims from Central Asia. In the Mongol social order, Saengmogin occupied a position just below the Mongols themselves, and exerted a great deal of influence within the Yuan dynasty.

The first named Muslim of Korean provenance, Ramadan ibn Alauddin, died in 1349.

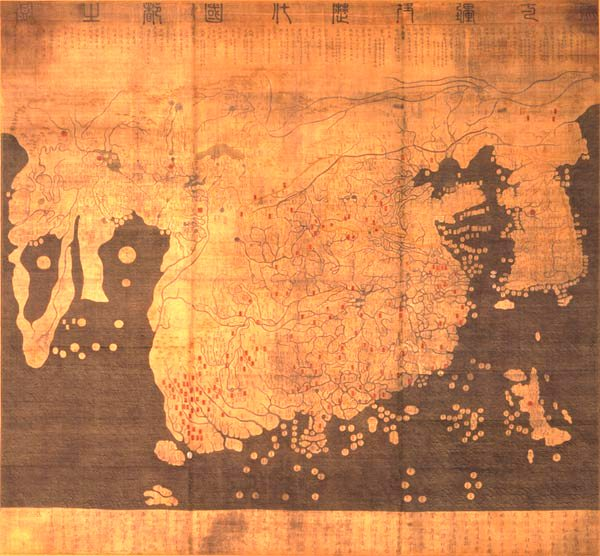
Gangnido reflects the geographic knowledge of China during the Mongol Empire when geographical information about Western countries became available via Islamic geographers.

Small-scale contact with predominantly Muslim peoples continued on and off. During the late Goryeo, there were mosques in the capital Kaesong, called Yegung, whose literary meaning is a "ceremonial hall".

One of those Central Asian immigrants to Korea originally came to Korea as an aide to a Mongol princess who had been sent to marry King Chungnyeol of Goryeo. Goryeo documents say that his original name was Samga but, after he decided to make Korea his permanent home, the king bestowed on him the Korean name of Jang Sunnyong. Jang married a Korean and became the founding ancestor of the Deoksu Jang clan. His clan produced many high officials and respected Confucian scholars over the centuries. Twenty-five generations later, around 30,000 Koreans look back to Jang Sunnyong as the grandfather of their clan: the Jang clan, with its seat at Toksu village.

The same is true of the descendants of another Central Asian who settled down in Korea. A Central Asian named Seol Son fled to Korea when the Red Turban Rebellion erupted near the end of the Mongol's Yuan dynasty. He, too, married a Korean, originating a lineage called the Gyeongju Seol that claims at least 2,000 members in Korea.

===== Soju =====
Soju was first distilled around the 13th century, during the Mongol invasions of Korea. The Mongols had acquired the technique of distilling arak from the Muslim world during their invasion of Central Asia and the Middle East around 1256. It was subsequently introduced to Koreans and distilleries were set up around the city of Kaesong. Indeed, in the area surrounding Kaesong, Soju is known as arak-ju (Korean: 아락주).

There are many restrictions in the Muslim community, including on diet and clothing; drinking alcohol and eating pork is forbidden. However, Korea's soju exports to Islamic countries are increasing, especially to Indonesia, the largest Muslim community country, where exports increased 10.1% from 2017. While Islamic countries enforce their dietary rules, they allow alcohol imports for the non-Muslims, and foreigners living in Indonesia are permitted to not follow the Islamic dietary laws.

==== Joseon period ====
===== Study of the Huihui Lifa =====
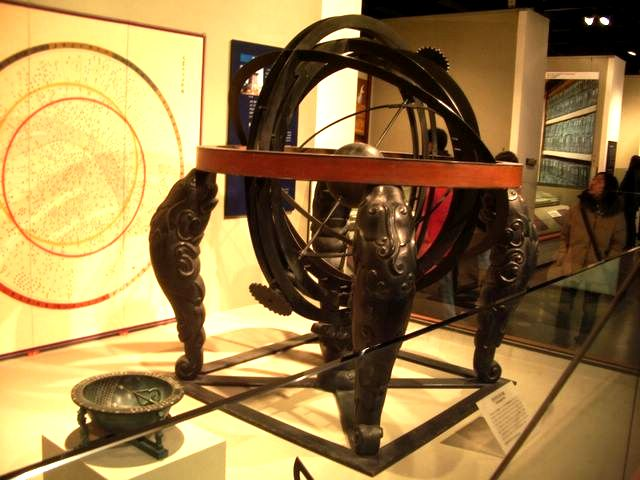
Korean celestial globe based on the Huihui Lifa.

In the early Joseon period, the Islamic calendar served as a basis for calendar reform owing to its superior accuracy over the existing Chinese-based calendars. A Korean translation of the Huihui Lifa "Muslim System of Calendrical Astronomy", a text combining Chinese astronomy with the zij works of Jamal al-Din, was studied during the time of Sejong the Great in the 15th century. The tradition of Chinese-Islamic astronomy survived in Korea up until the early 19th century.

===== Decree against the Huihui community =====
In 1427, Sejong ordered a decree against the Huihui (Korean Muslim) community that had special status and stipends since the Yuan dynasty. The Huihui were forced to abandon their headgear, to close down their "ceremonial hall" (mosque in the city of Kaesong) and worship like everyone else. No further mention of Muslims exists during the era of the Joseon.

==== Later periods ====
Islam was practically non-existent in Korea by roughly the 16th century, although memories of it and a minor Islamic presence survived until the 19th century and onwards. It is believed that many of the religious practices and teachings did not survive. However, in the 19th century, Korean settlers in Manchuria came into contact with Islam once again. It was re-introduced in a more concerted way than the centuries before in the 20th century.

=== 20th-century re-introduction ===
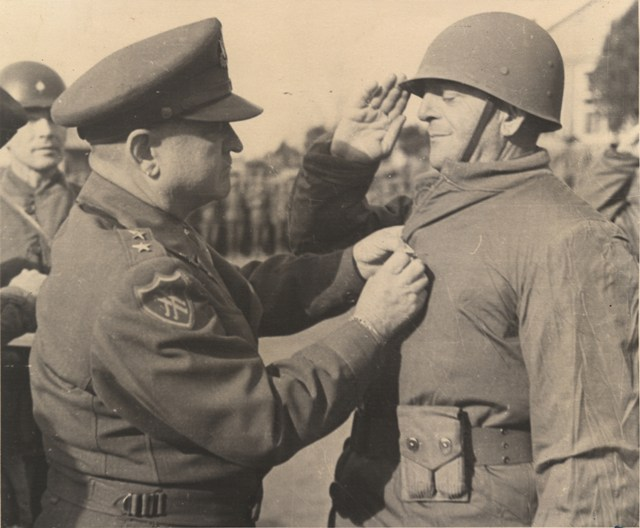
Turkish Brigade commander General Tahsin Yazıcı receiving the Silver Star from Lieutenant General Walton Walker (15 December 1950)

During the Korean War, Turkey sent a large number of troops to aid South Korea under the United Nations command called the Turkish Brigade. In addition to their contributions on the battlefield, the Turks also aided in humanitarian work, helping to operate war-time schools for war orphans. Shortly after the war, some Turks who were stationed in South Korea as UN peacekeepers began preaching Islam to Koreans. Early converts established the Korea Muslim Society (한국이슬람협회) in 1955, at which time the first South Korean mosque was erected at Imun-dong. The Korea Muslim Society grew large enough to become the Korea Muslim Federation in 1967.

== Today ==
=== Islam in North Korea ===
The Pew Research Center estimated North Korea's Muslim population to be negligible (less than 0.1%) in 2010. The Iranian embassy in Pyongyang hosts Ar-Rahman Mosque, the only mosque in the country.

=== Islam in South Korea ===
The Seoul Central Mosque (2014)

In 1962, the government of Malaysia (then Malaya) offered a grant of 33,000 USD for a mosque to be built in Seoul. However, the plan was derailed due to inflation. The Seoul Central Mosque was finally built in Seoul's Itaewon neighborhood in 1976. Today there are also mosques in Busan, Anyang, Gyeonggi, Gwangju, Jeonju, Daegu, and Kaesong. According to Lee Hee-Soo (Yi Huisu) in 2001, president of the Korea Islam Institute, there are about 10,000 listed Muslims (mostly foreign guest workers) in South Korea.

Seoul also hosts a Hussainiya near Samgakji Station for offering salah and memorializing the grandson of Muhammad, Husayn ibn Ali. Daegu also has a hussainiya (imambargah).

The Prince Sultan Islamic School, on the Seoul Central Mosque complex (2023)

The Korean Muslim Federation said that it would open the first Islamic primary school, Prince Sultan Bin Abdul Aziz Elementary School, in March 2009, with the objective of helping foreign Muslims in South Korea learn about their religion through an official school curriculum. Plans are underway to open a cultural center, secondary schools and even a university. Abdullah Al-Aifan, Ambassador of Saudi Arabia to Seoul, delivered $500,000 to KMF on behalf of the Saudi Arabian government.

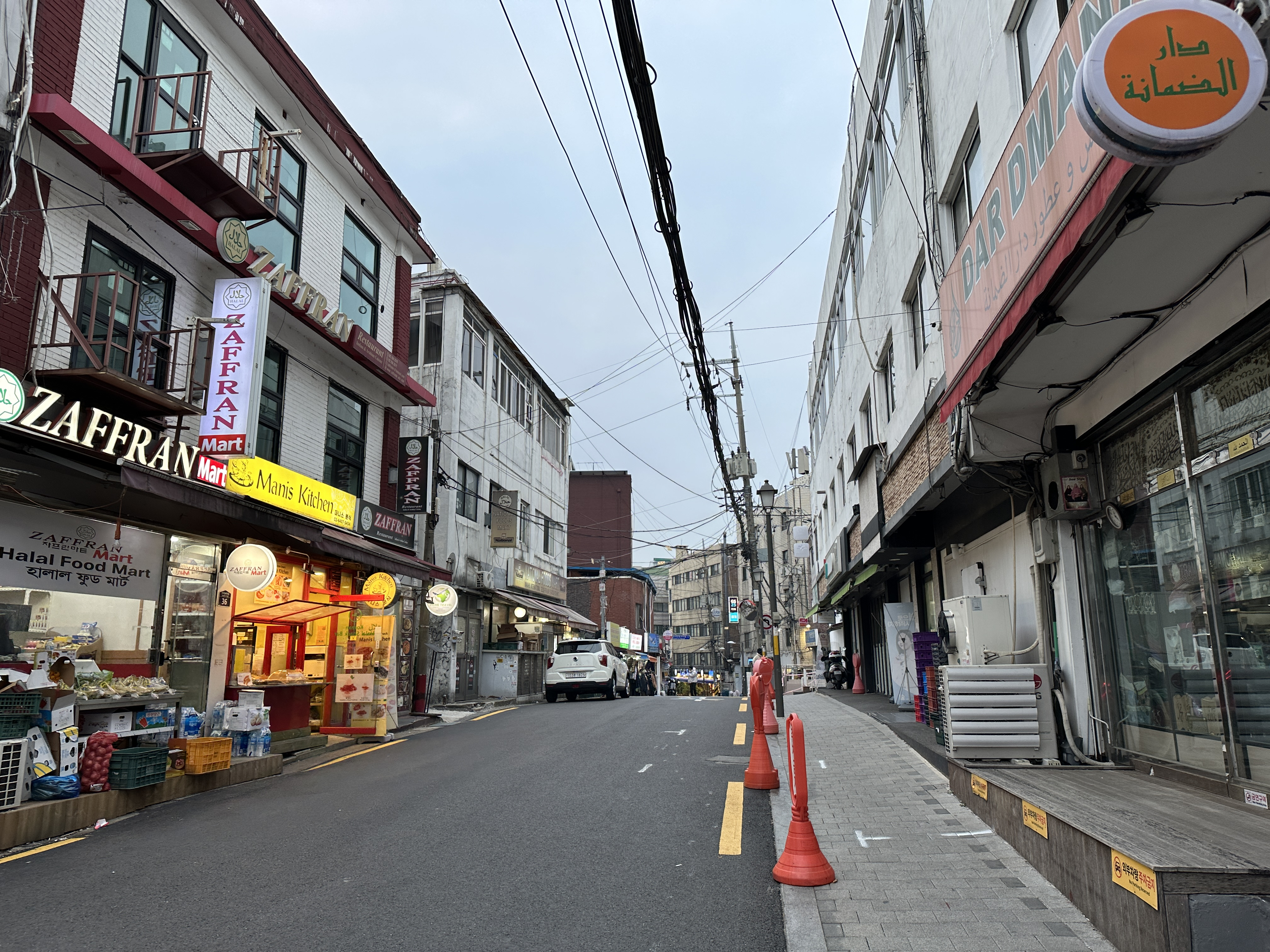
Middle Eastern businesses around the Seoul Central Mosque (2023)

The Korean Muslim Federation provides halal certificates to restaurants and businesses. Their halal certificate is recognized by the Department of Islamic Development Malaysia (JAKIM), and there are a total of 14 KMF-halal approved restaurants in South Korea as of January 2018.

Before the formal establishment of an elementary school, a madrasa named Sultan Bin Abdul Aziz Madrasa functioned since the 1990s, where foreign Muslim children were given the opportunity to learn Arabic, Islamic culture, and English. Hamid Choi, a prominent muslim South Korean translator also finished his Al-Quran and Shahih Bukhari translation to Korean in 2014.

Many Muslims in Korea say their different lifestyle makes them stand out more than others in society. However, their biggest concern is the prejudice they feel after the September 11 attacks. A 9-minute report was aired on ArirangTV, a Korean cable station for foreigners, on Imam Hak Apdu (Note: Imam Hak Apdu his Arabic name is Dr. Muhammad Abdul Wahab Zahid Al-Haq is a Syrian-born Islamic scholar and the current Grand Mufti of South Korea. He serves as the imam of the Jeonju Abu Bakr Al-Siddiq Mosque, located in Jeonju, Jeolla Province.) and Islam in Korea.

Migrant workers from Pakistan and Bangladesh make up a large fraction of the Muslim population. The number of Korean Muslims was reported by The Korea Times in 2002 as 45,000 while the Pew Research Center estimated that there were 75,000 South Korean Muslims in 2010, or one in every five hundred people in the country. Muslim immigration rates show a consistent upward trend. In 2004, Muslim cemetery is established in Chungju City.

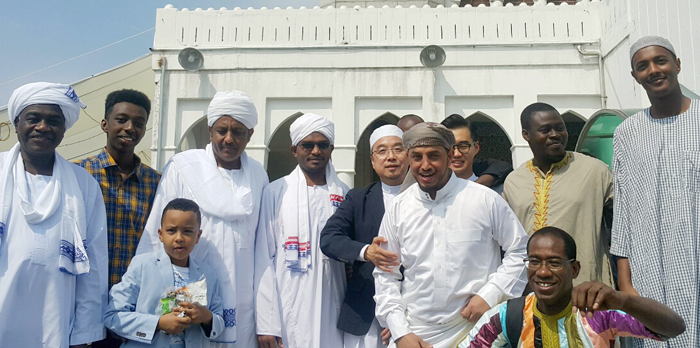
Sudanese Muslims celebrating Eid al-Fitr at the Seoul Central Mosque (2018)

Among Muslim communities, there are two distinct groups: traditional and immigrant Muslims. The "traditional" community of Muslims are usually Korean converts to Islam, while immigrants are people who migrated from Islamic countries to Korea for jobs, to increase the awareness of the religion and to escape hardship. Said migrants usually hail from regions such as West Asia, Central Asia, South Asia, and Southeast Asia. The immigration of non-Koreans had increased 9.2% compared to 2017, and among the people, the highest age group that decides to migrate are between 20 and 29, followed up with age of 10–19.

Mosque in Itaewon.

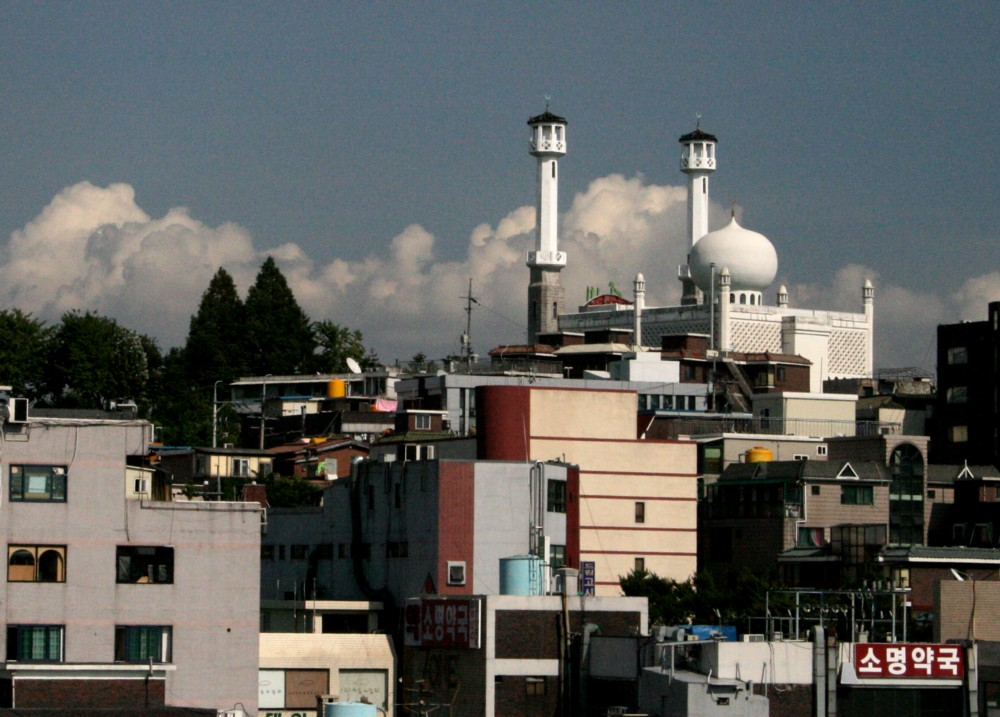
Seoul Central Mosque.

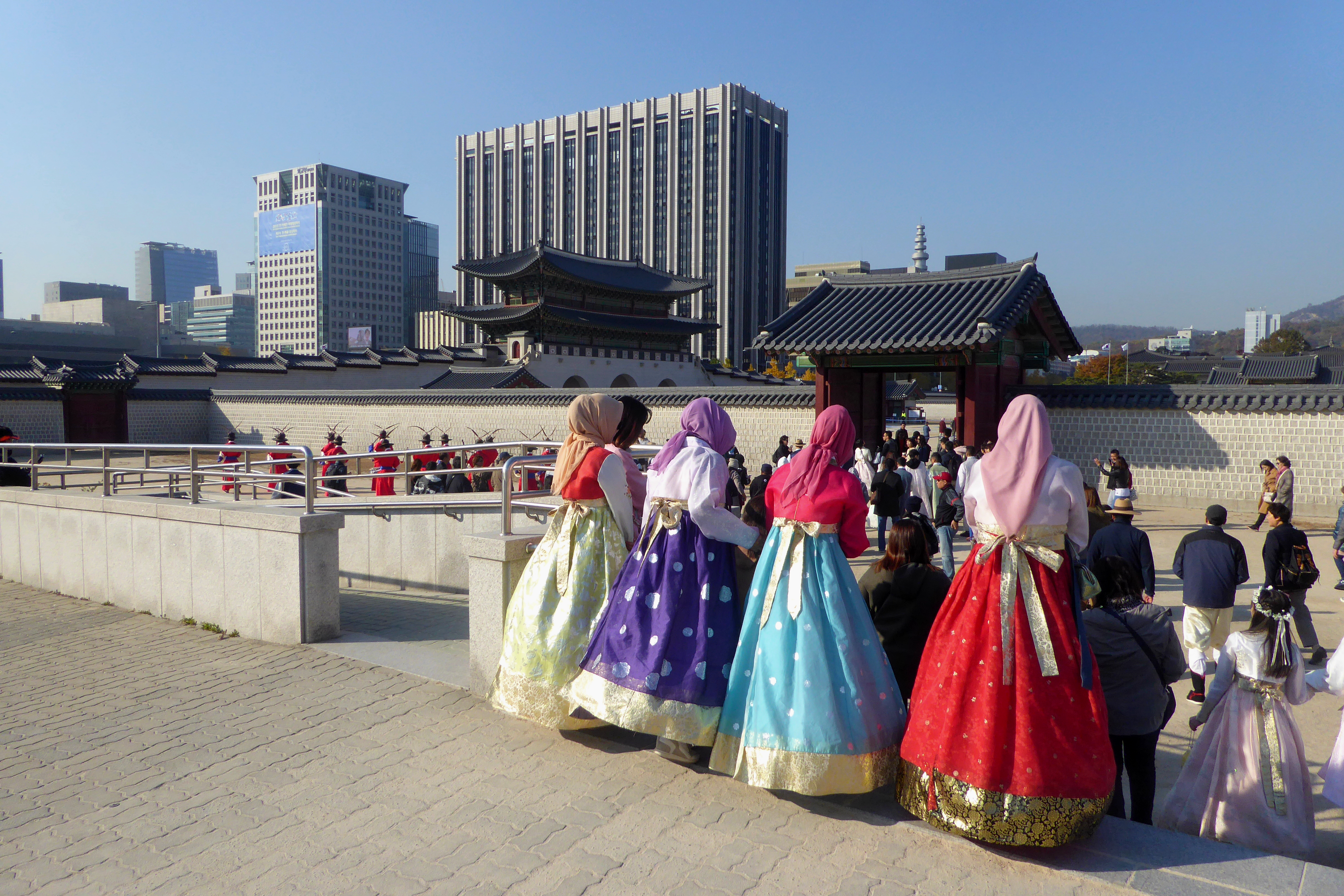
Muslim Women in Hanbok visiting the Gyeongbokgung Palace.

== See also ==
- Korea Muslim Federation
- List of mosques in South Korea
- Deoksu Jang clan
- Ramadan ibn Alauddin, first named Muslim from Korea Region.
