= Korea Muslim Federation =

Religious organization in South Korea

- 한국이슬람교
- Abbreviation: KMF
- Formation: 1967
- Location: South Korea
- President: Dr. Hussein Kim Dong-Eok
- Imam: Abdur Rahman Lee Ju-Hwa
- Website: www.koreaislam.org

Korea Muslim Federation (KMF; Korean: 한국이슬람교) is a Muslim organization established in 1967 in South Korea. The KMF oversees the Korean Muslim Students Association (Note: It was formed in September 1979 by 100 Muslim University students) and the Korea Institute for Islamic Culture. The federation also supports a madrasa for Qur'anic education.

== History ==
The Muslim community in Korea began to take shape in the 1950s through a number of informal Islamic associations. These efforts eventually coalesced into a unified national body, which was formed in 1966 and officially adopted the name Korea Muslim Federation. In 1967, the organization was formally registered as a judicial person through the Korean Ministry of Culture and Information.

During the 1970s, KMF expanded its activities internationally, opening a branch and Islamic center in Jeddah in March 1978, followed by another in Kuwait in July 1979, and one in Indonesia in 1982.

In August 2025, KMF celebrated the 70th anniversary of Islam in the Republic of Korea.

== Activities and functions ==
The focus of the organization is to manage the religious and community affairs of Korean Muslims, and to engage in charity and missionary work. The organization works on setting up missionary centers in major cities, developing existing mosques, and training imams. Information on Islam, local affairs and other relevant materials for Korean Muslims or the public are also made available.

The federation oversees the Korean Muslim Students Association and the Korea Institute for Islamic Culture.

KMF has been active in halal certification, providing halal certificates for restaurants and businesses in South Korea. Its halal certification is recognized by Malaysia's Department of Islamic Development (JAKIM). As of January 2018, there were 14 KMF-halal approved restaurants nationwide. A 2023 study highlighted KMF's leadership in ensuring Muslim minority access to halal products, noting its collaboration with the South Korean government and its role as the sole authority in halal certification.

In December 2022, KMF along with Korea Halal Authority entered into a Mutual Recognition Agreement (MRA) with Indonesia's halal body (BPJPH), enabling mutual halal certification recognition for food exports and imports between Korea and Indonesia. In March 2025, KMF issued a fatwa declaring that cultivated (lab-grown) meat can be considered halal provided it conforms to Islamic production guidelines.

KMF also organizes Hajj and Umrah pilgrimages. The KMF Hajj and Umra Travel Agency was established on January 25, 2022, following approval by Saudi Arabia's Hajj Province in December 2019.

== See also ==
- Islam in Korea
