= Yan Shu =

Chinese statesman, poet, calligrapher and a literary figure of the Song dynasty

- 晏殊
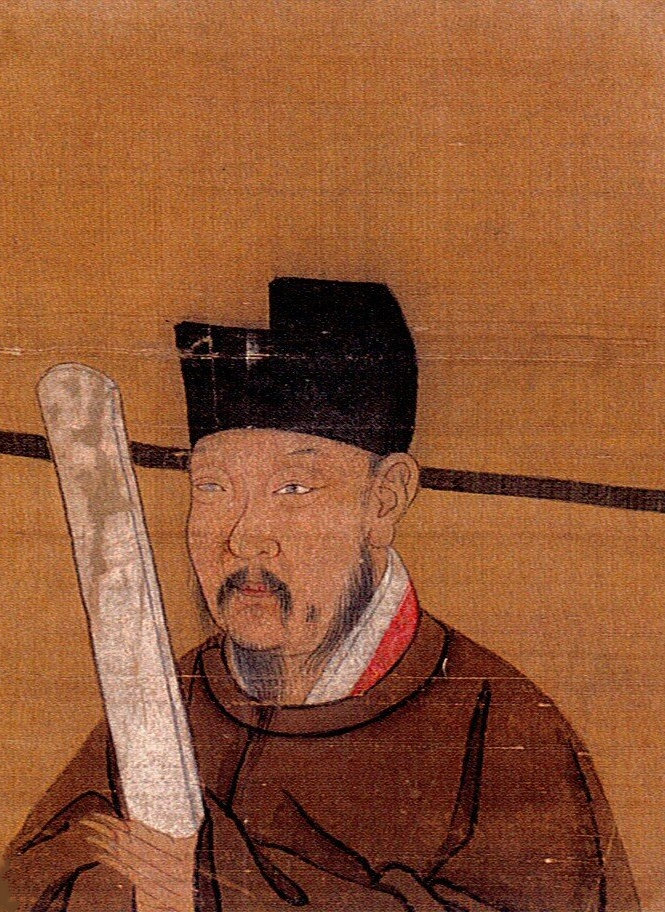
- Ming dynasty portrait of Yan Shu, Palace Museum, Beijing
- Born: 991; Linchuan District, Fuzhou, Jiangxi
- Died: 1055; Bianjing (汴京), modern day Kaifeng
- Occupations: Calligrapher, essayist, poet, and politician
- Children: Yan Jidao
- Writing career
- Period: Song dynasty
- Subjects: Calligraphy, poetry

Yan Shu (Chinese: 晏殊; pinyin: Yàn Shū; Wade–Giles: Yen Shu, 991–1055), courtesy name Tongshu (同叔), was a Chinese poet, politician, calligrapher, and essayist of the northern Song dynasty. He was given the posthumous title of Yuanxian (元獻) as well as bestowed the title of Duke of Linzi.

Yan Shu was born in modern-day Linchuan District of Fuzhou, Jiangxi. He was considered a child prodigy and, at the age of 14, passed the imperial examinations. He had a long official career at central court and at regional posts, serving two emperors including Zhenzong and Renzong. He was a mentor and patron for younger generation of scholar officials and played a pivotal role in the Qingli reforms.

During his lifetime, Yan Shu composed over 10,000 ci poems, though most have been lost. Of the surviving works, the Pearl Jade (珠玉詞), which contains 136 remaining poems, is considered to be one of his most notable works. Other extant works include portions of The Lasting Writings of Yuanxian (晏元獻遺文) and The Categories (類要). Along with Ouyang Xiu, he was collectively referred to as "Yan-Ou" in recognition to their shared contributions to the ci genre.

He was a scholar of the Hanlin Academy. He served as prime minister to Emperor Renzong during the Qingli Reforms and played a pivotal rule in this political movement.

== Early life ==
By the age of five, Yan Shu was already composing poems, and at fourteen, he passed the imperial examinations with ease, competing against over a thousand candidates from across the country. During the verse composition segment of the exam, he informed the examiner that he had already completed the assigned challenge and requested for a different one. Emperor Zhenzong admired his talents and sincerity, and bestowed upon him the title of Tong Jinshi (同進士). According to the History of Song, Prime Minister Kou Zhun (寇準) remarked that Yan Shu was from a remote region south of the Yangtze River, to which Emperor Zhenzong replied, "Wasn’t Zhang Jiuling also from a remote region?" He received his initial post as a secretariat at Imperial Archives, where he furthered his studies with Chen Pengnian.

== Career ==
Starting from 1006, Yan was successively promoted to positions such including ceremonial officer at the Ministry of Rites and vice director at the Ministry of Imperial Banquets, eventually becoming the advisor to the Crown Prince Zhao Zhen in 1018 (who later became Emperor Renzong).

Every time Emperor Zhenzong sought Yan Shu's advice on matters, he would write the questions in small characters on a slip of paper and hand it to him. After writing down his suggestions, Yan Shu would present them to the emperor along with the original slip. The emperor greatly appreciated his caution and thoroughness.

In the first year of the Qianxing era (1022), the 12-year-old Emperor Renzong ascended the throne, with Empress Liu acting as regent. The Prime Minister Ding Wei and the Commissioner of Military Affairs Cao Liyong sought to monopolize power, leading to widespread discussions among court officials, who were at a loss as to how to resolve the situation. Yan Shu proposed the form of "governing from behind a curtain" (where the Empress Dowager would hear court affairs from all officials but not appear publicly), a suggestion that gained the support of the ministers. As a result, Yan Shu was promoted to senior official at the Remonstrance Bureau (右諫議大夫). He was later appointed as vice minister of Rites, Director of the Office of Personnel Evaluation, before being further promoted to vice commissioner of the Bureau of Military Affairs.

However, he opposed Zhang Qi's promotion to commissioner of the Bureau of Military Affairs, which went against Empress Dowager Liu's wishes. In 1027, he was impeached by the censors for breaking a subordinate's tooth with his court tablet in a fit of anger at Empress Liu's Yuqing Palace. While serving as vice Minister of Justice and being demoted to Prefecture of Yingzhou, Yan Shu dedicated himself to expand the Yingtianfu Academy, which later became one of the Four Great Academies. He also invited Fan Zhongyan to lecture there.

In the first year of the Mingdao era (1032), Yan Shu was promoted to assistant to the Director of State Affairs. However, the following year, he was demoted to prefecture of Haozhou and Chenzhou due to his opposition to Empress Dowager Liu's proposal to wear the imperial robe when worshiping at the Imperial Ancestral Temple. Five years later, he was recalled and appointed as Minister of Justice and vice Commissioner of the Censorate, where he assisted northern Song in repelling the Western Xia invasions.

In the second year of the Qingli era (1042), Yan Shu was promoted to the rank of chancellor (同中書門下平章事) and commissioner of the Bureau of Military Affairs, holding significant military and administrative power. During his tenure as the chancellor, he supported and worked along with other reform-minded scholar officials including Fan Zhongyan, Han Qi, Fu Bi, and Ouyang Xiu, to initiate the Qingli reform, the first political reform of the Song dynasty.

However, two years later, he was impeached by the remonstrant Sun Fu and Cai Xiang over the compilation of the epitaph for Consort Li (the biological mother of Emperor Renzong) and was demoted to Prefecture of Yingzhou, later transferred to Chenzhou, Xuzhou, and Yongxing Army.

In the first year of the Zhehe era (1054), Yan Shu returned to the capital for medical treatment due to illness. Emperor Renzong retained him to lecture in the Yiying Pavilion, and an imperial decree was issued allowing him to have an audience every five days in the front hall. A year later, Yan Shu's illness worsened.Shortly afterward, on the 28th day of the first month in the second year of the Zhihe era (February 27, 1055), Yan Shu died. Emperor Renzong personally mourned his death and regretted not visiting Yan Shu while he was bedridden. In his grief, the emperor refrained from attending court for two days. Yan Shu was given the posthumous title "Yuanxian (元獻)." The inscription on his memorial stele bore the characters "Stele of Old Learning."

== Poetry ==
Yan Shu was considered one of the most important ci lyrist during the northern Song era. He played a critical role in elevating ci - originally a folksong form- into an elegant literati pursuit. His ci poetry frequently attributes human emotions to natural scenes, reflecting the eternal themes of change and mortality. He admired and was greatly influenced by ci poet Feng Yanji from the Five Dynasties period in both composition and style. His lines are delicate, calm, and concise. His artistic taste and techniques ushered Song poetry to a new era, leaving a lasting impact on his younger contemporary Ouyang Xiu, his son Yan Jidao, and later generations of poets.

Some of Yan's most well-known poetry include To the tune “Sands of the Washing Stream”—“A single new song, a single cup of wine” (浣溪沙 · 一曲新詞酒一杯):

一曲新詞酒一杯，
去年天氣舊亭台。
夕陽西下幾時回？
無可奈何花落去，
似曾相識燕歸來。
小園香腸獨徘徊。

Translation:

A single new song, a single cup of wine
On the old terrace in last year's weather.
The settling sun has gone west, when will it return?
There's no help for it, the blossoms fall and disappear;
I seem to recognize them, the swallows come back again.
On the fragrant path of the little garden, I linger alone.

== Legacy ==
Yan Shu, despite holding high positions for many years, remained approachable and humble. He selected officials based solely on merit, and many prominent figures, such as Fan Zhongyan, Kong Daofu, and Wang Anshi, emerged from his mentorship. He also nurtured and recommended accomplished statesmen, including Han Qi, Fu Bi, and Ouyang Xiu.

Ouyang Xiu once evaluated his mentor Yan Shu with a verse "Fifty years of affluence and leisure, always worldly-wise and self-preserving". This remark was often interpreted as a criticism towards Yan Shu's political personality, suggesting he was tactful and lacked integrity. Traditional literary criticism often held that Yan had a smooth career path, a comfortable life, and was a mediocre statesman with little political legacy. Contemporary scholars, however, disputed the view that Yan was merely a calculating politician, arguing instead that he was a righteous and outspoken imperial advisor. During nearly 50 years in officialdom, he spent about 16 years in exile due to his open and bold criticism of the emperor. In addition, the talents he recruited for the imperial court were all forthright individuals who prioritized their obligations to the states over personal interests.

Yan Shu’s role in promoting mass education and political reform were somehow over-shadowed by that of his protégé, Fan Zhongyan and Ouyang Xiu. It’s noteworthy that Yan was implemental in reforming imperial examination, by shifting the focus on verse composition techniques to practical challenges in solving real life problems in government administration. He played a key role in promoting mass education at the prefecture level, particularly by reviving and expanding the Yingtianfu Academy. He invited Fan Zhongyan to lecture and nurtured many capable graduates.

During the Qingli reform, Yan served as the vice Chancellor to Renzong, exercising significant authority over personnel decisions, including the promotion and dismissal of officials. Fan Zhongyan, a key proponent of the reform, along with core members like Fu Bi and Ouyang Xiu, are either Yan Shu’s protégés or sons-in-law. They shared not only personal ties but also common political ideals, forming a progressive force. The recruitment of reformist and the implementation of reforms during the Qingli era were closely linked to the ups and downs of Yan Shu’s political career, underscoring his pivotal role in this period.

== Bibliography ==
- He, Mian Shan (1993). "晏殊与北宋文化" [Yan Shu and the Northern Song culture] (PDF). 中国文化研究所学报 (3). The Chinese University of Hong Kong: 151–170.
- Shao, Ming Zhen (2015). "晏殊平议- 兼论晏殊作品的评价问题" [On Yan Shu: The Evaluation of Yan Shu's Literary Works]. Journal of East China Normal University (Humanities and Social Sciences)] (47（4）): 133–142.
- Shao, Ming Zhen (2019). "晏殊"明哲保身"辩正" [Reconsidering Yan Shu's Worldly-wise and Self-preserving Personality]. Theoretical Studies in Literature and Arts)] (2): 117–125.
- Sun, Wang; Chang, Guowu, eds. (1996). 宋代文学史- 上 [History of Song Literature] (in Chinese). Vol. I. 北京: 人民文学出版社. p. 110. ISBN 7-02-002118-2.
- Zhang, Longxi (2022). A History of Chinese Literature. London: Routledge. ISBN 978-1-003-16417-3.
- Zhang, Yi; Li, Ruishan (2003). Luo, Zongqiang; Chen, Hong (eds.). 中国古代文学发展史 (Zhongguo gu dai wen xue fa zhan shi) (Di 1 ban ed.). Tianjin: Nan kai da xue chubanshe. ISBN 978-7-310-01915-1.
