= Han Qi (Song dynasty) =

Chinese politician, chancellor of Northern Song dynasty

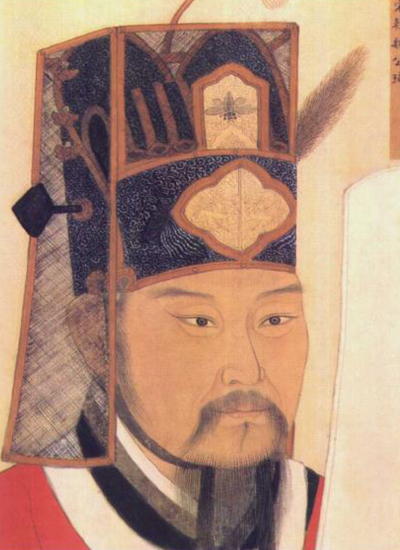
Han Qi as depicted in the Qing imperial palace archives

Han Qi (Chinese: 韓琦; Wade–Giles: Han Ch’i, 1008–1075), courtesy name Zhigui (稚圭), was born in Quanzhou (modern-day Quanzhou City, Fujian Province), with ancestral roots in Xiangzhou, Anyang County (modern-day Anyang City, Henan Province). He was a senior-ranking statesman during the Northern Song dynasty, serving three emperors including Renzong, Yingzong, and Shenzong. Alongside statesman Fan Zhongyan, Han Qi defended against the Western Xia as a border official, and played a leading role in the Qingli reforms.

== Life and career ==
Han Qi was born on August 5, 1008 in Quanzhou during the reign of Emperor Zhenzong. At the time, his father, Han Guohua, was serving as the prefect of Quanzhou. Han's mother, Lianli, was a maid in Han Guohua's household. The Han family had a tradition of bureaucratic service, and Han Guohua eventually rose to the position of Right Remonstrator-in chief (右谏议大夫).

When Han Qi was three years old, both his parents died. He was raised by his elder brothers. As he matured, he developed a strong sense of self-reliance and nurtured great ambitions. Han Qi was described as dignified, reserved, and uninterested in frivolous pursuits. He possessed a pure and straightforward character, free of deceit, and excelled academically beyond his peers.

In the fifth year of the Tiansheng reign (1027), Han Qi achieved second place (榜眼, bangyan) in the first class of the imperial examination. While working in the Hanlin Academy, his colleagues Wang Gongchen and Ye Dingji often argued loudly. Han Qi, reviewing documents in a private chamber, acted as though he did not hear the commotion.

In the first year of the Jingyou reign (1034), during the ninth month, he was promoted to Deputy Magistrate of Kaifeng Prefecture. In the twelfth month of the second year, he was further promoted to fiscal supervisor and appointed Grand Master of Ceremonies. By the eighth month of the third year, he was elevated to the position of Right Remonstrator.

In the first year of the Kangding reign (1040), when the Western Xia attacked Song border, Han Qi was appointed as a military commander in Shaanxi. He advocated for concentrating forces to attack Western Xia and rejected Fan Zhongyan's defence-oriented strategy. Under his command, the Song forces engaged the Western Xia army, led by Zhang Yuan, at Haoshuichuan (好水川) beneath the Liupan Mountains in present-day Longde, Ningxia. The Song army suffered a crushing defeat in the Battle of Haoshuichuan, resulting in nearly 70,000 deaths.

After this defeat, Han Qi began to adopt Fan Zhongyan's military strategies and collaborated with him to resist Western Xia, becoming known at the time as "Han-Fan". Both Han Qi and Fan Zhongyan spent a considerable time defending the frontier, earning widespread recognition. A folk song popular among the border people at the time chanted: "In the army, there is the Han, at the sound of his name, the western bandits quake in fear. In the army, there is the Fan, At the sound of his name, western bandits are terrified to their core."

In the third year of the Qingli reign (1043), Han Qi was appointed as deputy Commissioner of the Bureau of Military Affairs. Alongside Fan Zhongyan and Fu Bi, they launched the Qingli Reforms with initial support from Emperor Renzong, aiming to strengthen overall military readiness, increase government efficiency, and improve the economy while reducing the fiscal burdens on the people. The Qingli reforms did not last long, and by the spring of 1045, the major proponents of reforms have all been demoted to regional posts including Han Qi.

In the first year of the Jiayou reign (1056), the court appointed Han Qi as the commissioner of the Three Bureaus, but before he arrived in Bianjing (Kaifeng), his appointment was changed to chief commissioner of the Bureau of Military Affairs.

In the second year of Jiayou (1057), Su Zhe passed the imperial examination and soon wrote to Han Qi requesting an audience from the senior mentor. This letter entitled "Letter to Chief Commissioner Han" became a model piece as of a meeting request.

Han Qi was implemental in endorsing and supporting Emperor Yinzong's succession following the death of Renzong. In the eighth year of Jiayou (1063), after Emperor Yingzong ascended the throne, Han Qi was appointed Director of Imperial Mausoleums, overseeing Emperor Renzong's funeral. He was further promoted to Minister of the Secretariat and granted the title Duke of Wei State. After Empress Dowager Cao returned power to Emperor Yingzong, Han Qi was appointed Right Chancellor and promoted to Duke of Wei State.

When Emperor Shenzong ascended the throne, Han Qi served as Minister of Works and Palace Minister, again as Director of Imperial Mausoleums for Emperor Yingzong's burial at Yonghou Mausoleum. Following the burial, Han Qi voluntarily resigned from court service and was reassigned as military Commissioner of Zhen'an and Wusheng Commands, Minister over the Military, and Palace Minister, taking up duties in Xiangzhou, Yongxing Army, Daming Prefecture, and other regions.

Although a proponent of the Qingli reforms, Han Qi opposed the later reform initiative known as the Xining reforms led by Wang Anshi.

== Bibliography ==
- History of Song, Volume 312, Biography 71 [宋史, 卷三百十二] 列傳第七十一
- Fang, Jian (2001). 范仲淹评传(Fan Zhongyan ping zhuan) [A Critical Biography of Fan Zhongyan]. Critical biography series of Chinese thinkers (1st ed.). Nanjing: Nanjing University Press. ISBN 978-7-305-03657-6.
- Guo, Xudong, ed. (2003). 韩琦传略. Xinhua chubanshe. ISBN 9787501162703.
- Wu, Gou (2020). Songrenzong, Gongzhi Shidai 宋仁宗，共治时代 [Emperor Renzong, an era of Collective Governance] (in Chinese). Guilin: Guangxi Normal University Press. ISBN 9787559826725.
- McGrath, Michael (2009). Twitchett, Denis; Smith, Paul Jakov (eds.). The Cambridge history of China. Vol. 5, Part One: The Sung Dynasty and Its Precursors, 907–1279. Cambridge [Eng.] ; New York: Cambridge University Press. ISBN 978-0-521-21447-6.
