= Fan Zhongyan =

Chinese poet, politician, philosopher and writer (989–1052)

Fan Zhongyan 范仲淹
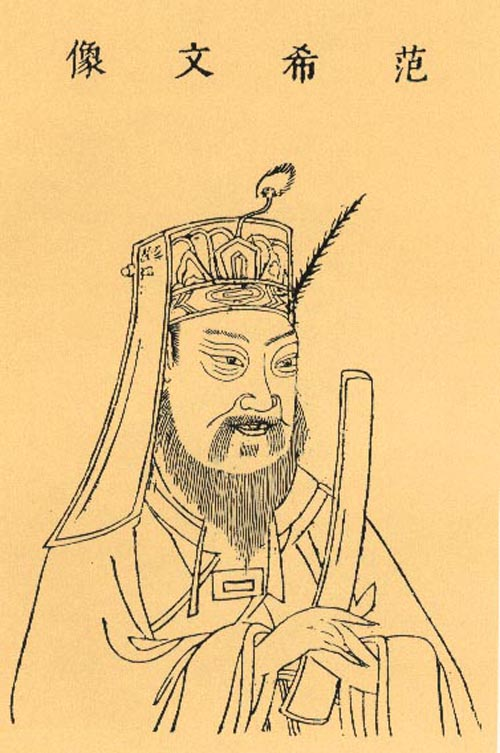
- A block print portrait from Sancai Tuhui (1609)

Vice Chancellor of the Song dynasty
- In office September 1043 – January 1045
- Monarch: Emperor Renzong

Personal details
- Born: 5 September 989 Wu County, Su Prefecture, Northern Song
- Died: 19 June 1052 (aged 62) Xu Prefecture, Northern Song
- Resting place: Yichuan County, Henan, China; 34°29′32″N 112°32′53″E
- Spouse: Lady Peng (彭氏)
- Children: Fan Chunyou (范純祐); Fan Chunren (范純仁); Fan Chunli (范純禮); Fan Chuncui (范純粹); 3 daughters
- Parents: Fan Yong (范墉) (father); Lady Xie (謝氏) (mother)
- Posthumous name: Duke of Wenzheng (文正公); Imperial Duke of Chu (楚國公)

Fan Zhongyan
- Chinese: 范仲淹
Transcriptions
Standard Mandarin
- Hanyu Pinyin: Fàn Zhòngyān
- Wade–Giles: Fan^{4} Chung^{4}-yen^{1}

Zhu Yue
- Traditional Chinese: 朱說
- Simplified Chinese: 朱说
Transcriptions
Standard Mandarin
- Hanyu Pinyin: Zhū Yuè

Fan Xiwen / Zhu Xiwen
- Chinese: 范希文 / 朱希文
Transcriptions
Standard Mandarin
- Hanyu Pinyin: Fàn Xīwén / Zhū Xīwén

Fan Zhongyan (5 September 989 – 19 June 1052), courtesy name Xiwen (希文), was an accomplished statesman, writer, scholar, and reformer of the northern Song dynasty. After serving multiple regional posts and at the imperial court for over two decades, Fan was appointed as a vice chancellor by Emperor Renzong to lead the Qingli reforms. Although short-lived, the Qingli reforms and Fan Zhongyan's ideas inspired later reformers, most notably Wang Anshi. Fan's attitude towards official service is encapsulated by his oft-quoted line on the proper attitude of scholar-officials: "They were the first to worry the worries of all-under-Heaven, and the last to enjoy its joys". Fan's philosophical, educational and political contributions were exemplar of a Confucian scholar dedicated to public service. He was considered a mentor and leader of the lettered class and a pilot in political reforms. He advocated for the classical prose movement and is well-known for his ci poetry. He elevated the charitable family estate to an important institution promoting social welfare at the community level.

== Life and career ==
=== Early life ===
Fan Zhongyan, was born in Wu County, Su Prefecture. His father Fan Yong had been serving as an official of the government at different locations, and died the year after Fan Zhongyan was born. Fan Zhongyan's mother, Lady Xie, returned to Su Prefecture and buried her husband at the Fan clan's ancestral burial ground, Tianping Mountain. When Fan was about four or five, Lady Xie remarried Zhu Wenhan (朱文翰), a government official in Wu County. Fan Zhongyan's name was subsequently changed to Zhu Yue (朱說). Fan Zhongyan moved with stepfather Zhu and mother Lady Xie to different places where Zhu took governmental posts. Always feeling grateful to stepfather Zhu's kindness, Fan tried to pay back the Zhu family after becoming successful.

In his late teens and early twenties, Fan Zhongyan travelled and learned with knowledgeable Confucian intellectuals, as well Taoist and Buddhist sages . He traveled far to today's Shaanxi province and befriended Taoist priests Zhou Debao, Qu Yingyuan, and other intellectuals such as Wang Zhu. The experience broadened Fan's horizon. In year 1011, Fan started schooling at the Yingtianfu Academy (應天府書院), in today's Henan province, one of the Six Great Academies. Historical anecdotes held that he lived an austere lifestyle with scarce food, while persisted on learning. He didn't take help from his family while he was a student. Another anecdote says he didn't go outside his classroom to catch a glimpse of the visiting emperor as he was engrossed in his morning reading session, and he told his classmates that he would go see the emperor later. By his late twenties, he had mastered the Confucian classics, and established his aspiration to become a virtuous Confucian scholar who can adhere to the Dao, serve the welfare of the people, and regard personal gains lightly.

In 1015, he successfully passed the imperial examination and became a jinshi, after which he resumed his Fan surname and received his mother again to provide for her.

=== Career ===
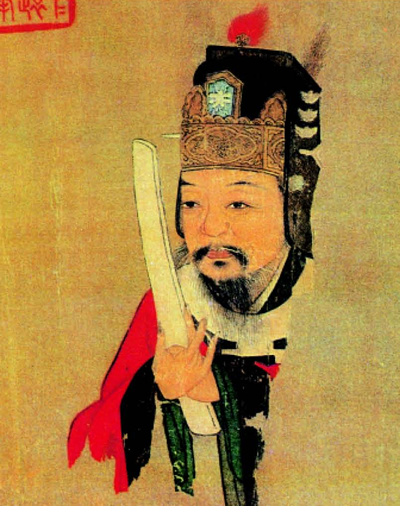
Painting of Fan Zhongyan

In the early 1020s, Fan served a variety of regional posts, including as magistrate for the Jiqing Army (in modern-day Bozhou, Anhui), and as a salt regulator (盐仓监) in Taizhou. He then became the county magistrate of Xinghua County (in modern-day coastal Jiangsu). In 1025, along with his colleague and friend Teng Zongliang (滕宗谅) he engaged in a series of dyke-building activities along the coastal counties. Before completion of this three-year project, Fan's mother died and he resigned his post for filial mourning. In recognition of Fan's dedication to advocating for this project, the locals named the 150 kilometer dyke "Mr. Fan Dyke" (范公堤).

In 1027, at the invitation of Yan Shu, Fan lectured at his alma mater Yingtianfu Academy. During this time, his ideas on education reform and the selection of officials began to take shape. He advocated for shifting the focus of education from ornamental literary composition to the teachings of ancient sages, emphasizing both moral cultivation and the development of administrative skills in statecraft. These ideas were later incorporated into his blueprint for the Qingli Reforms and subsequently adopted by Wang Anshi in the Xining Reforms.

In 1036, Fan served as the prefect of capital city Kaifeng. While there, he took on a young Ouyang Xiu as a disciple; a partnership that would become very important during the Qingli era. In the capital, Fan openly and strongly condemned the grand councilor Lü Yijian for his favoritism in official selection and promotion. The two argued non-stop in front of the emperor. The clashes ended up in the exile of Fan and his supporters to regional posts as punishment. This incident marked the start of far-reaching factional controversies that would plague the politics of the empire.

In 1040, faced with the revolt of Tangut leader Li Yuanhao, the court dispatched Fan along with Han Qi to Shaanxi to inspect the defenses. Fan re-organized the troops for a more prompt response to Tangut attacks, and implemented his long-term pursuit of deep defense based on fortified settlements. His methods proved effective and ultimately facilitated the peace negotiations between the Song and Western Xia in 1042.

From 1046 to 1050, after the Qingli reforms were aborted, Fan Zhongyan served as a local official in Dengzhou and Hangzhou. In Dengzhou, he renovated and expanded the Baihua Zhou estate, transforming it into an academy within a picturesque state park. During his tenure in Dengzhou, Fan was highly prolific in his literary endeavors, producing numerous essays, poems, epitaphs, and letters, including the mostly quoted "On Yueyang Tower". In Hangzhou, he successfully implemented a work relief program to overcome a famine, by recruiting refugees to work on large scale public infrastructure projects.

Fan died in June 1052 at the age of 64. He was posthumously honored with the title "Wenzheng" (文正). He was buried at Wan'an Mountain in Yichuan, Luoyang, the western capital. Emperor Renzong personally inscribed the title of his stele as "Monument to Honor the Virtuous." Fu Bi composed his tomb inscription, and Ouyang Xiu authored the spirit path stele.

=== Qingli reforms ===
After the Song dynasty granted the Western Xia indemnities similar to those granted to the Liao dynasty in the Chanyuan Treaty, and in anticipation of resuming cross-border trade with Song, Western Xia leader Li Yuanhao eventually agreed to a subordinate status in the peace negotiation with Song in 1044. To address challenges faced by the empire including military crisis at the border, famines, epidemics, and peasant uprisings in several regions, Fan along with fellow advocates of Confucian ideals, including Fu Bi, Ouyang Xiu, and Han Qi, launched reform at the court. In the fall of 1043, Fan Zhongyan and Fu Bi jointly presented a ten-point proposal covering various aspects of government administration, including reforms to the civil examination and recruitment system, higher pay for minor local officials to discourage corruption, and wider sponsorship programs to ensure that officials were drafted more on the basis of merit.

However, many of the reforms that he introduced met with the opposition of conservative politicians who felt the system did not need drastic changes and who felt threatened by the prospect of change halfway through their well-established careers. After Fan and his fellow reformer Ouyang Xiu had been charged with forming a faction, which was considered subversive by definition, Emperor Renzong rescinded the reforms in 1045 and expelled the reformist from the central court. Fan Zhongyan was relegated to the prefect of Dengzhou; there he established the influential Huazhou Academy.

=== Educational reforms ===
Fan started off educational reforms as early as the late 1020s when he lectured at the Yingtianfu Academy. In the early Northern Song era, prefectural schools were neglected by the state and were left to the devices of wealthy patrons who provided private finances. While Chancellor, Fan Zhongyan issued an edict that provided government funding and private financing to restore and rebuild all prefectural schools that had fallen into disuse and abandoned since the Five Dynasties and Ten Kingdoms (907-960). Fan attempted to restore all county-level schools in the same manner, but did not designate where funds for the effort would be formally acquired and the decree was not taken seriously until the later Emperor Huizong of Song who expanded the county-level school system dramatically. Fan's trend of government funding for education set in motion the movement of public schools that eclipsed private academies, which would not be officially reversed until Emperor Lizong of Song in the mid 13th century.

=== Influence ===
Fan Zhongyan was regarded as a classical Confucian scholar-official, demonstrating loyalty both to the emperor and to the welfare of the people. He championed and practiced his ideals of government service in both regional posts and the central court. Fan spearheaded a series of initiatives that led to the Qingli Reforms, which aimed to address key issues such as talent recruitment, border defense, and various social and economic challenges faced by the empire. Although short-lived, the spirit of the Qingli Reforms later inspired reformers like Wang Anshi. Fan’s significance also lies in his promotion of Confucian learning and the establishment of schools for commoners. Additionally, he strengthened Chinese familism by founding the Fan charitable estate, a clan organization that provided education and social support at the community level.

== Literary works ==
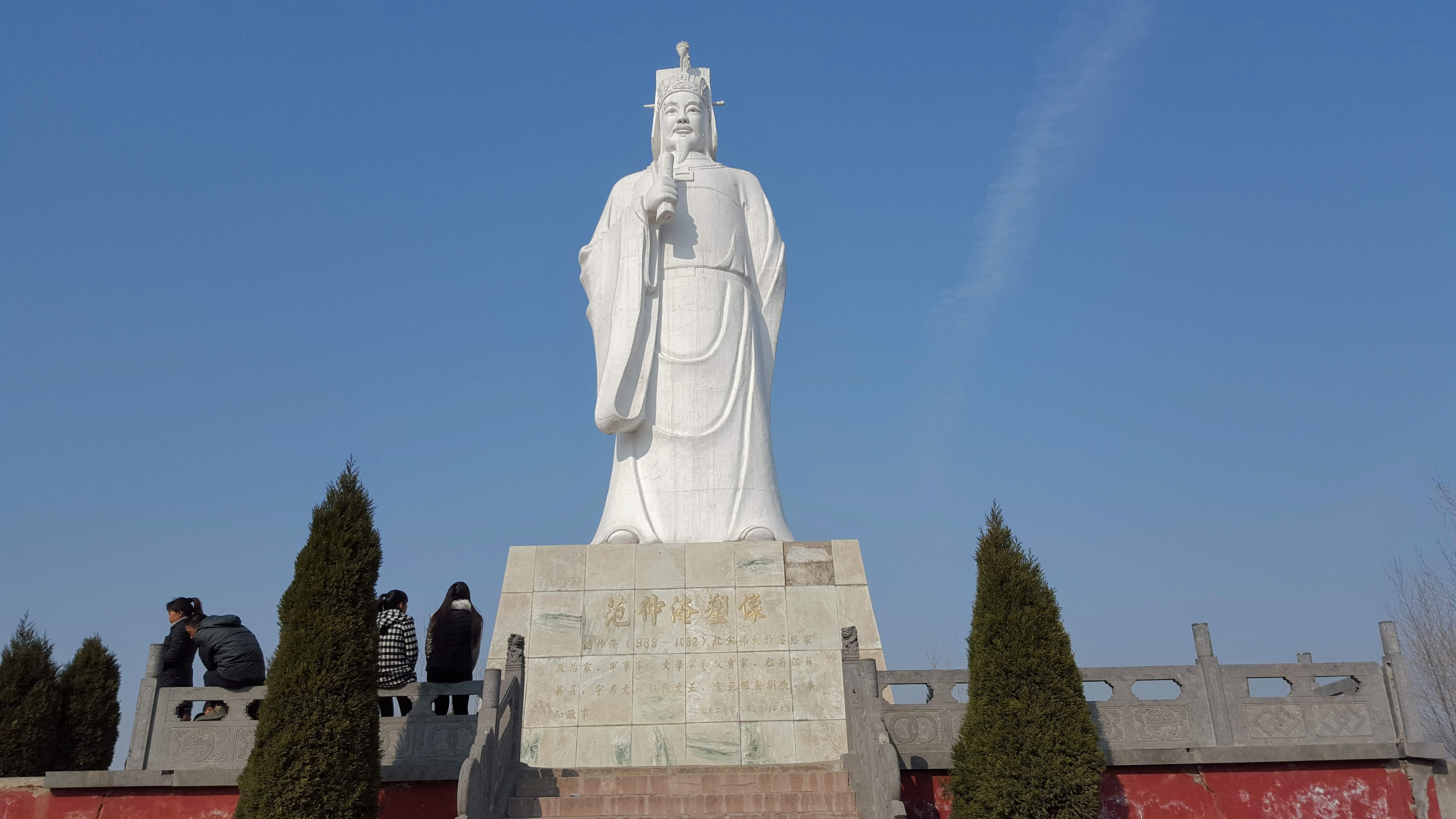
Statue in Fan Zhongyan's tomb site in Yichuan County, Henan

Fan Zhongyan was a proponent of ancient Confucian writings and values advocated by his younger associate Ouyang Xiu. He argued that essay writing should serve as a tool for political discourse and social reform rather than showy ornamentation. Fan's literary collection consists primarily of letters, political memoranda, and policy critiques. While he left a substantial body of shi poetry, he is better remembered for his ci compositions.

One of Fan's most cited literature is "On Yueyang Tower" (1046). The descriptive prose piece was composed at the invitation of Teng Zongliang, who was then the local prefect and had rebuilt the famed ancient tower. Yueyang Lou, a city gate by the side of Dongting Lake, was known as one of the three great towers in Southern China, due to their association with famous literary works (the others being Yellow Crane Tower and Pavilion of Prince Teng).

This piece was written during Fan's post in Dengzhou, Nanyang, without an actual site visit to the tower. It contains a most frequently quoted line on the ideal of Chinese scholar-officials: "When they occupied a high position at court, they felt concern for the people. When banished to distant rivers and lakes, they felt concern for their sovereign." Fan further calls on his fellow scholar-officials to be "the first to worry the worries of All-under-Heaven, and the last to enjoy its joys" (先天下之憂而憂，後天下之樂而樂). These lines sum up the scholar-official's idealized self-image of self-denial and loyal service.

"Better remonstrate and die, than keep silent and live" (寧鳴而死，不默而生) is another well-known quotation of Fan. This quote comes from "Ling Wu Fu" (靈烏賦, a poem on the spirit crow) in 1036, which was written in reply to the advice of a friend, Mei Yaochen. Mei tried to persuade Fan to stop bearing so much concern for others and to start caring for his own career and life. In response, Fan told a fable about a spirit bird, using the metaphor to express his aspirations. It embodies the moral integrity, sound conscience, and responsibility required of a Confucian scholar. The 19th-century liberal scholar Hu Shih compared Fan's statement to Patrick Henry's famous 1775 declaration, "Give me liberty, or give me death." Hu Shih described Fan's words as a bold call for liberty, or freedom of speech, made some 740 years before Henry's.

Fan Zhongyan was known for his ci poetry. Among the most famous are "To the tune, Screened by Su curtain" (蘇幕遮, Su Mu Zhe), written primarily to convey homesickness, and "To the tune, the Pride of the Fisherman" (漁家傲, Yu Jia Ao). Together with Su Shi, he was considered one of the founders of the haofang (豪放) school of ci.

To the Tune "Screened by Su curtain" - Nostalgia:

碧雲天，黃葉地，秋色連波，波上寒煙翠。
山映斜陽天接水，芳草無情，更在斜陽外。
黯鄉魂，追旅思，夜夜除非，好夢留人睡。
明月樓高休獨倚，酒入愁腸，化作相思淚。

Translation:

Clouds veil emerald sky, leaves strewn in yellow dye, waves rise in autumn hue, and blend with mist cold and green in view.
A home sick heart, when far apart, lost in thoughts deep, night by night but sweet dreams can lull me into sleep.
Hills steeped in slanting sunlight, sky and waves seem one; unfeeling grass grows sweet beyond the setting sun.
Don't lean alone on rails when the bright moon appears, wine in sad bowels would turn into nostalgic tears.

— Translated by Xu Yuanchong

== Family ==
=== Ancestors and history ===
Fan Zhongyan is a descendant of Fan Lübing, a Grand Chancellor of the Tang dynasty. Fan Zhongyan’s close ancestors all served as officials in the imperial governments. His grandfather Fan Zanshi (范贊時) famously passed the Imperial examination at age nine as a child prodigy.

All four sons of Fan Zhongyan served as officials in the imperial government of the Song dynasty, and two of them Fan Chunren and Fan Chunli also became chancellors of China. Among Fan Zhongyan and his sons, and the families married with Fan Zhongyan's family, together there were eight Chancellors, indicating the powerful influence of Fan Zhongyan's family on the Song dynasty at the time.

- Fan Mengli 范夢齡: Fan Zhongyan's great-grandfather, conferred as Duke of Xu 徐國公 posthumously
- Fan Zanshi 范贊時: Fan Zhongyan's grand father, conferred as Duke of Cao 曹國公 and Duke of Tang 唐國公 posthumously
- Fan Yong 范墉: Fan Zhongyan's father, conferred as Duke of Su 蘇國公 and Duke of Zhou 周國公 posthumously

=== Immediate family ===
Fan Zhongyan and his wife who was from Peng Clan (彭氏) had four sons, all of whom also entered the government:

- Fan Chunyou (范纯佑, 1024—1063)
- Fan Chunren (范纯仁, 1027—1101), Chancellor of the Song dynasty, prominent member of the conservative faction during the Wang Anshi Reforms, ratified as the Duke of Zhongxuan (忠宣公) posthumously
- Fan Chunli (范纯礼, 1031一1106), Chancellor of the Song dynasty, ratified as the Duke of Gongxian (恭獻公) posthumously
- Fan Chuncui (范纯粹, 1046—1117)

=== Overseas branch descendants ===
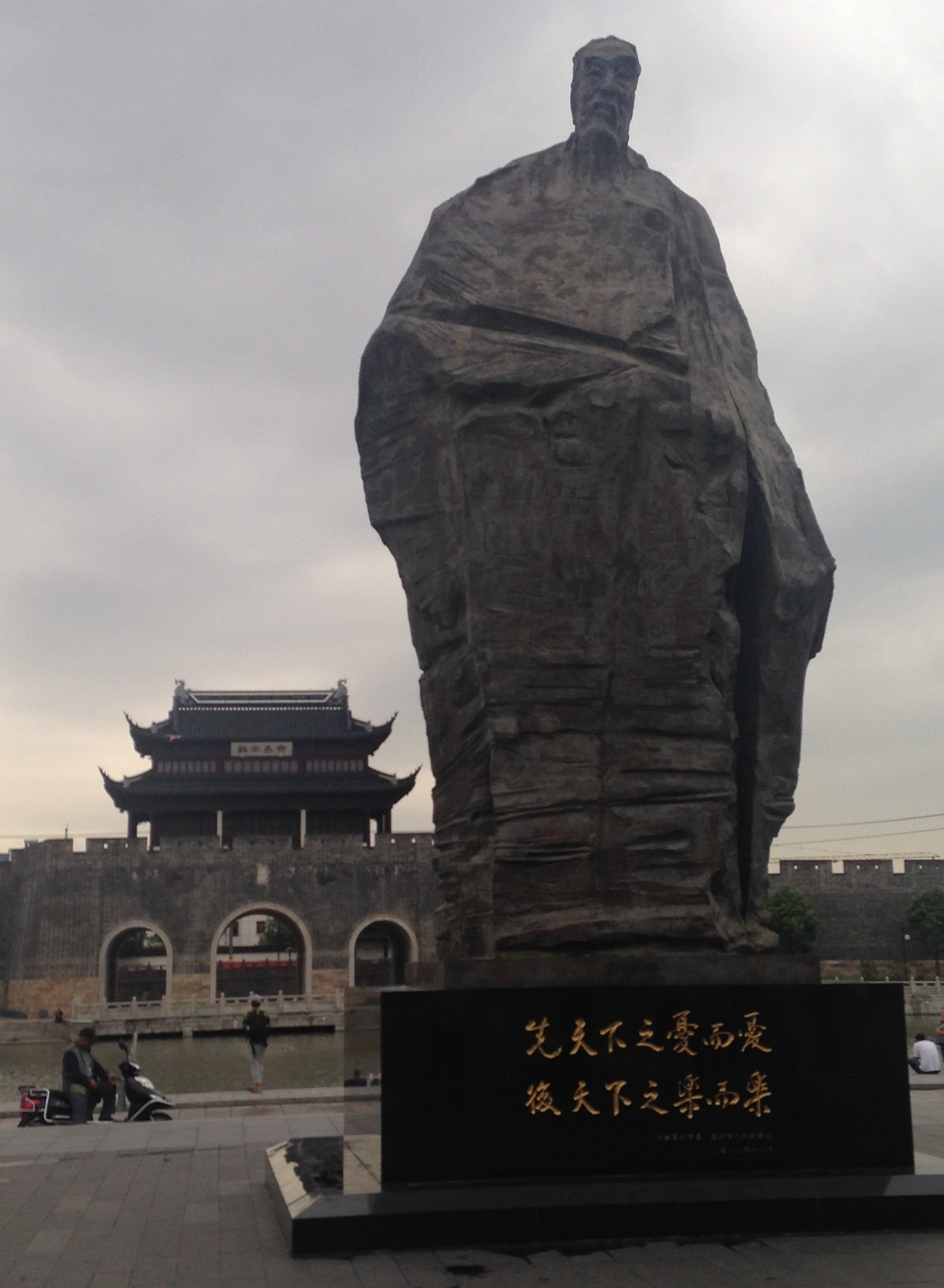
Statue of Fan Zhongyan in front of Suzhou railway station

Fan Zhongyan had many descendants. According to the Book of Gaoping Fan Clan Genealogy (高平范氏族谱), his 9th descendant is Fan Fachuan (范法传) who lived at Meixian in Guangdong Province and truly integrated into Hakka Chinese society.

Fan Daliang (范达亮), 12th descendant from Fan Fachuan and 21st descendant from Fan Zhongyan who migrated to Nanyang or Southeast Asia and arrived in 1879 at Cirebon, West Java, Indonesia when he was 18. Fan Daliang had another spelling name in Indonesia because influenced by the spelling of the Dutch language: "Hoan Tat Liang" or "Hoan Tat Liong". The second name of Fan Daliang is Hoan Tje Huang (范之皇) as a kleermaker, garment business owner, and fabric shop owner. Hoan Tat Liang had seven children by married to Sundanese women who called Arengsih or Nyai Hoan Tat Liang.

Sons:

- Fan Binghe (范炳和) or Hoan Piang Ho married to Boen Ih Nio (温诒娘)
- Fan Linhe (范麟和) or Hoan Lin Ho married to Jao Jen Moy (姚园妹) and Oey Roe Nio (黄如娘)
- Fan Honghe (范鸿和) or Hoan Fung Ho married to Oey Hap Nio (黄合娘)

Daughters:

- Fan Cainiang (范彩娘) or Hoan Tjai Nio married to Kang Boen Hie (江汶禧)
- Fan Caifeng (范彩凤) or Hoan Tjai Hoeng married to Tjiong Clan (蒋氏)
- Fan Caiding (范彩定) or Hoan Tjai Tin married to Lo Clan (罗氏)
- Fan Cailai (范彩来) or Hoan Tjai Loy married to The Sin Keng (郑承庆), son of Luitenant der Chinezen The Tjiauw Yong te Cheribon.

Living descendants of Fan Zhongyan include Fan Lei, a famous American musician currently teaching at the Central Conservatory of Music in Beijing, China.

== See also ==
- Ci (poetry)
- Song poetry
- History of the Song dynasty
- Culture of the Song dynasty
- Grand chancellor (China)
- Patrick Henry

== Bibliography ==
- Egan, Ronald (2010). "The Northern Song (1020–1126)". In Owen, Stephen (ed.). The Cambridge history of Chinese literature. Vol. 1. Cambridge: Cambridge university press. ISBN 9780521855587.
- Fang, Jian (2001). Fan Zhongyan ping zhuan 范仲淹评传 [A Critical Biography of Fan Zhongyan]. Critical biography series of Chinese thinkers (1st ed.). Nanjing: Nanjing University Press. ISBN 978-7-305-03657-6.
- Golas, Peter J. (2015). Chaffee, John W.; Twitchett, Denis (eds.). The Cambridge history of China, Vol. 5, Part Two, Sung China, 960-1279. Vol. 5, Part Two: Sung China, 960–1279. Cambridge [Eng.]; New York: Cambridge University Press. ISBN 978-0-521-24330-8.
- Liu, James T.C. (1957). "An early song reformer: Fan Chung-yen". In Fairbank, John K. (ed.). Chinese Thought and Institution. Chicago: The university of chicago press.
- McGrath, Michael (2009). Twitchett, Denis; Smith, Paul Jakov (eds.). The Cambridge history of China. Vol. 5, Part One: The Sung Dynasty and Its Precursors, 907–1279. Cambridge [Eng.]; New York: Cambridge University Press. ISBN 978-0-521-21447-6.
- Mote, F.W. (1999). Imperial China: 900-1800. Harvard University Press. pp. 124, 136–138.
- Sun, Wang; Chang, Guowu, eds. (1996). 宋代文学史- 上 [History of Song Literature] (in Chinese). Vol. I. 北京: 人民文学出版社. p. 110. ISBN 7-02-002118-2.
- Yuan, Zheng (Summer 1994). "Local Government Schools in Sung China: A Reassessment". History of Education Quarterly. 34 (2): 193–213. doi:10.2307/369121. JSTOR 369121.
- Zhang, Cong Ellen (2016). "Bureaucratic Politics and Commemorative Biography - The Epitaphs of Fan Zhongyan". In Ebrey, Patricia Buckley; Smith, Paul Jakov (eds.). State power in China, 900-1325. A China Program book. Seattle: University of Washington Press. ISBN 978-0-295-99810-7.
