= Fu Bi =

Song dynasty statesman

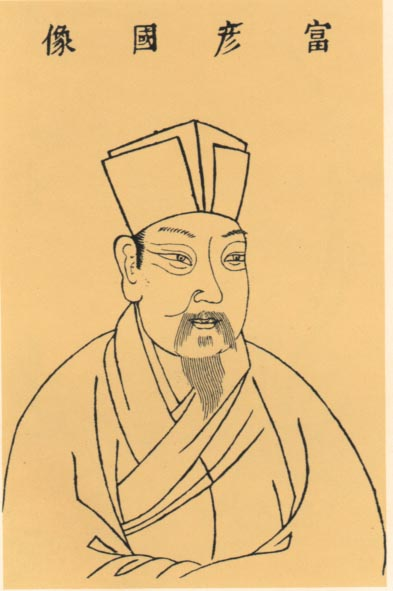
Fu Bi

The signature (huaya) of Fu Bi

Fu Bi (Chinese: 富弼; Wade–Giles: Fu Pi; 1004–1083), courtesy name Yanguo (彥國), was a native of Henan Prefecture (modern-day eastern Luoyang, Henan). He was a statesman and literary figure of the Northern Song dynasty. He had a long official career serving various high-ranking roles during the reigns of three emperors and held the position of grand chancellor under both Emperor Renzong and Emperor Shenzong.

Fu was a key figure, alongside Fan Zhongyan, in the Qingli Reforms, a series of initiatives aimed at strengthening the administration of the Song dynasty. He was also the son-in-law of Yan Shu, a renowned statesman and ci poet. By the Southern Song dynasty, Emperor Lizong recognized Fu Bi as one of the 24 accomplished statesmen (昭勋阁二十四功臣), placing him in the company of notable ministers such as Han Qi and Sima Guang.

== Career ==
=== Under Emperor Renzong and Yingzong ===
In the second year of the Qingli era under Emperor Renzong (1042), Fu Bi was sent as an envoy to the Khitan Liao dynasty. Following Emperor Renzong's instructions, he successfully convinced Liao to drop the demand for territorial concessions by agreeing to an increase in the annual tribute. The following year, he was appointed Vice Commissioner of the Bureau of Military Affairs (枢密副使, shumi fushi). Alongside Fan Zhongyan and others, he was a major proponent of the Qingli Reforms. He co-authored the ten-point memorial in 1043 with Fan, the agenda of reform proposals.

The reforms were unable to withstand backlash from established career bureaucrats or secure the full trust and support of Emperor Renzong. Allegations of factionalism and potential plotting against the emperor particularly targeting Fu Bi, plagued the reformer group.

In the fifth year of the Qingli era (1045), Fu Bi was sidelined upon the failure of Qingli Reforms and demoted to regional posts as the administrator of Yunzhou and Qingzhou (modern-day Yidu, Shandong). At that time, Hebei was struck by severe flooding, leading to widespread displacement of refugees. The number of refugees reached six to seven hundred thousand. After taking office, Fu Bi collected food from local officials and residents and supplemented with government stock. The sick and the elderly were provided for. Refugees were also allowed to freely harvest from mountains, forests, and ponds to sustain themselves. Those who died were buried in mass graves called "communal tombs". Through this disaster relief initiative, Fu Bi saved more than 500,000 lives and recruited over 10,000 refugees into the military.

In the second year of the Zhihe era (1055), he served as chancellor alongside Wen Yanbo.

In 1061, Fu resigned due to the death of his mother. In 1063, when Emperor Yingzong ascended the throne, Fu Bi was recalled to serve as the Commissioner of the Bureau of Military Affairs. However, he requested to down again citing his foot ailment and was subsequently granted the noble title "Duke of Zheng."

=== Role in border affairs ===
Fu Bi served as an envoy to the Liao dynasty on multiple occasions and was highly attentive to the situation with the Western Xia. He recognized that the Liao was "truly powerful" and that the Western Xia was "growing stronger by the day." Unlike the tribal peoples of antiquity, these groups had become formidable rivals to the Central Plains civilization. In Fu Bi's view, the strength of the Liao and Western Xia lay in their occupation of agrarian regions and their effective use of Han Chinese talents and resources. As he observed:

"They have seized Han Chinese land, adopted Han titles, emulated Han administrative structures, employed Han talent, studied Han literature, used Han vehicles and attire, and implemented Han laws. In these ways, both of these adversaries have become comparable to the Han China, while their armies and commanders outperform us. What we possesses, they have completely acquired, and in areas where they excel, we falls short."

Leveraging his profound understanding of the relationships among the Song, Liao, and Western Xia, Fu Bi helped the Song Dynasty pry apart the Liao-Xia alliance, contributing to the eventual stabilization of the three-way power balance among the Song, Liao, and Western Xia.

=== Under Emperor Shenzong ===
In the first year of the Xining era (1068), Fu Bi was summoned to the court by Emperor Shenzong. Emperor Shenzong Zhao Xu asked him how to handle border affairs. Fu Bi replied, "Your Majesty has not been on the throne for long and should focus on spreading virtue and benevolence. I hope that for twenty years, no one will speak of war." Upon hearing this, Emperor Shenzong remained silent.

In the second year of the Xining era (1069), when Wang Anshi was appointed as a minister to carry out the New Policies, Fu Bi was reinstated as grand chancellor. However, he opposed Wang Anshi's reforms and requested to resign again. He was then appointed as the governor of Bozhou (modern-day Bo County, Anhui). Fu Bi refused to implement the New Policies, particularly the green sprouts law, stating, "The new law is something I am not acquainted with." He later retired to Luoyang, continuing to petition for the abolition of the New Policies.

In the sixth year of the Yuanfeng era (1083), Fu Bi passed away. Before his death, he submitted a memorial to Emperor Shenzong outlining the essentials of good governance and pointing out the flaws in the current political situation. His son, Fu Shaoting, later presented this memorial to the emperor. The memorial included a suggestion to return the encroached land in the Hehuang region to the Tibetan factions in order to promote peace and reduce military tensions.

After his death, Fu Bi was posthumously honored with the title "Wenzhong" (文忠).

== Bibliography ==
- Toqto'a; Temür Daš; He Weiyi (賀惟一); Zhang Qiyan (張起巖); Ouyang Xuan (歐陽玄); Li Haowen (李好文); Wang Yi (王沂); Yang Zongduan (楊宗端), eds. (1346). "Vol. 313, biography of Fu Bi". Songshi 宋史 [History of the Song dynasty]. Twenty-Four Histories, book 22 (in Chinese).
- McGrath, Michael (2009). "The Reigns of Jen-tsung (1022–1063) and Ying-tsung (1063–1067)". In Twitchett, Dennis; Smith, Paul Jakov (eds.). The Cambridge History of China, Volume 5: The Sung Dynasty and its Precursors, 907–1279, Part 1. Cambridge: Cambridge University Press. pp. 279–346. doi:10.1017/CHOL9780521812481.006. ISBN 978-0-521-81248-1.
