= Jianyuan =

Jianyuan may refer to:

- Remonstrance Bureau (Chinese: 諫院), a government agency during the Song and Jurchen Jin dynasties
- 建元 (literally "to establish an era name"), the first time an emperor (in Sinosphere) establishing an era name

== Chinese era names ==
- Jianyuan (140BC–135BC), era name used by Emperor Wu of Han
- Jianyuan (315–316), era name used by Liu Cong (Han-Zhao), emperor of Former Zhao
- Jianyuan (343–344), era name used by Emperor Kang of Jin
- Jianyuan (365–385), era name used by Fu Jian (337–385), emperor of Former Qin
- Jianyuan (479–482), era name used by Emperor Gao of Southern Qi
