= Ni Yuanlu =

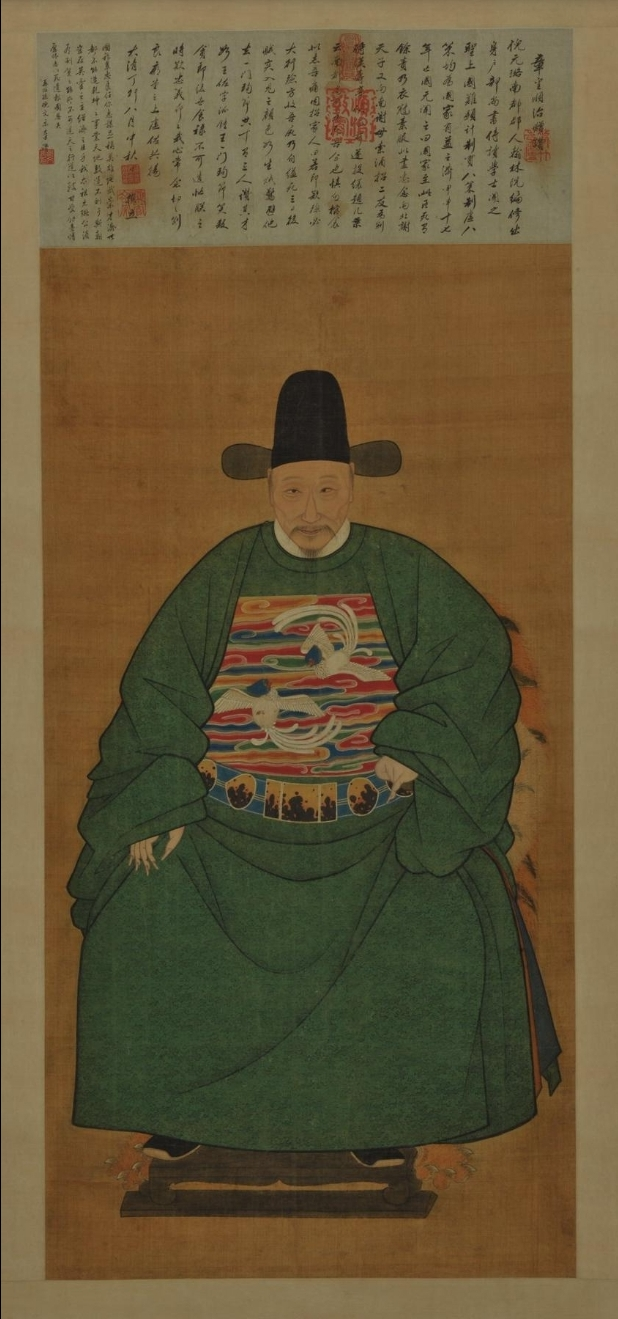
Ni Yuanlu, Portrait of Ming dynasty official, before 1680. Anhui Museum, Hefei, China

Ni Yuanlu (Chinese: 倪元璐; pinyin: Ní Yuánlù; Wade–Giles: Ni Yüan-lu; ca. 1593–1644), courtesy name Yuru (玉汝), art name Hongbao (鴻寶), posthumous names Wenzheng (文正) and Wenzhen (文貞), was a high-ranking official, calligrapher, and painter of the Ming dynasty of China.

Ni was born in Shangyu, Zhejiang. He passed the imperial examination in 1621 as a jinshi and was a scholar in the Hanlin Academy. Ni's calligraphy used a semicursive script style with refined strokes. Ni committed suicide by hanging at the end of the Ming dynasty.
