= Qingli Reforms =

Song dynasty political reforms

The Qingli Reforms or Qingli New Policies (simplified Chinese: 庆历新政; traditional Chinese: 慶曆新政; pinyin: Qìnglì xīnzhèng), took place in China’s Northern Song dynasty, under Emperor Renzong's reign, led by scholar officials Fan Zhongyan, Han Qi, Fu Bi, and Ouyang Xiu. Taking place from 1043 to 1045 during the Qingli era (1041–1048), it was a short-lived attempt to introduce reforms into the traditional way of conducting governmental affairs in imperial China. Although it ended in defeat due to resistance of the opponents and the power struggle between the emperor and the emerging literati officials, it served as an inspiration and a precursor to a grander effort three decades later led by Wang Anshi.

== Background ==
The mid-11th century, spanning from the end of the Western-Xia wars in 1045 to Emperor Shenzong's ascension in 1068, was a period of remarkable innovation in Chinese political thought and institutions. Emperor Renzong, known for his openness and tolerance, fostered a spirit of progress that included a significant dialogue on the roles of sovereign and ministers. For the first time, a substantial number of Confucian literati held influential bureaucratic positions gained through civil examinations, who were involved in making and effecting policies. Lastly, the war with Western-Xia and the budget deficit of the empire prompted the urgency for changes that were not called for at stable times.

== Leading figures ==
The reforms were led by a group of same-minded scholars headed by Fan Zhongyan, along with his young associate Han Qi, Fu Bi, and Ouyang Xiu.

=== Fan Zhongyan ===
Fan Zhongyan was the leading figure of the Qingli Reform. He passed the imperial examination in 1015, followed by a long official career serving various regional posts until the early 1040s. Before appointed the Vice Grand Chancellor in 1043 by Emperor Renzong, Fan entered central politics only briefly, including serving as the prefect of Kaifeng (the imperial capital) in 1035. His outspoken demeanor and bold criticism against Emperor Renzong, regent Empress Liu, and the Chief Chancellor often ended in his demotion to regional posts. Fan embraced the penalties as he believed a good official shall fear no blames as a setback to his honest suggestion to the sovereign.

In 1040, when the Western Xia threatened Song security, Fan was dispatched to the border to organize a strong defense. By 1043, Fan's defence strategy started to show some success, and he was summoned back to central court to lead the Qingli Reforms.

Following the defeat, Fan Zhongyan was deported to Dengzhou.

=== Ouyang Xiu ===
Ouyang Xiu was posted to Kaifeng four years after passing his jinshi examination in 1030. He began his association with Fan from this time in Kaifeng. Following Fan's demotion in 1036, Ouyang criticized Fan's principle critic, resulting in himself being sent to a minor post in Hubei. When Emperor Renzong decided to launch reforms, Ouyang Xiu was brought back to the capital in the 1040s where he was appointed a policy critic.

== Ten-Point Memorial ==
Fan Zhongyan and Fu Bi submitted to the emperor a joint ten-point memorial in 1043 outlining reform agendas. They can be largely divided into the following categories:

1. Increase administrative efficiency by improving the appointment, evaluation, and compensation of officials;
2. Reform the education and civil examination system;
3. Promote agricultural activities and strengthen military defense;
4. Properly and fully implement laws and regulations.

== Implementation ==
The first measure undertaken was to allow competent officials to stay in one post for more than three years and for unable or treacherous officials to be removed more easily. Sons and relatives of state officials were banned from automatically inheriting the post of their father. The importance of poetry in the imperial examinations was reduced in favour of essays and the Confucian classics. Supervision over officials in the provinces responsible for the transport of tax grains was increased and appointed directly by the central government. Land allotted to officials was redistributed more adequately. Agricultural productivity was enhanced by the construction of dykes and canals to improve irrigation. Troops garrisoned around the capital were to engage in agriculture and be trained in a more effective way. Service corvée was to be reduced. Proclamations and edicts issued by the court were to be followed by imminent implementation, with greater control over their implementation.

Many of these reforms were put into effect in the two-year period from 1043 to 1045. However, without the full support of the emperor, there never was complete implementation of the reforms. Not long after they began, backlash from groups of officials, large land owners, and the wealthy in general resulted in the dismissal Fan Zhongyan and Fu Bi in 1045.

Changes in the school and the examination system endured to the extent that local schools at prefecture levels were enhanced; the ancient style of writing focusing on plain prose and statecraft discussions were given preference over ornamental literature. Further more, the Imperial University was created as part of the reforms for the education of the children of commoners and low-ranking officials, which was the only institution that survived the reversal of the reforms.

== Legacy ==
The Qingli Reforms was the dynasty's first Confucian political movement, highlighting a revival of Confucian ideas and the rise of regional elites who gained advanced social status through learning, civil exams, and government services. While traditional scholarship attributed the failure of the reforms to the strong opposition from the conservative faction and the career bureaucrats, recent studies have highlighted that the underlying cause of the defeat was the power struggle between the emperor and the emerging literati class in a novel attempt to "co-rule" the empire. While Emperor Renzong temporarily allowed scholar-officials to participate in central decision-making, he was hesitant to fully entrust the reformers or to dismantle entrenched imperial protocols.

Fan Zhongyan, the leader of Qingli Reforms, was considered a "teacher for an entire generation" by later reformer Wang Anshi. Fan and his ideals served as an inspiration for subsequent political reforms.

Wang Anshi would take up the banner of reform in the 1070s, not only pushing for many of the Qingli Reforms, but going even further. However, while they remained in place longer than the Qingli Reforms, with the exception of some reforms to the examination system, this reform effort similarly met a dead end.

== See also ==
- New Policies (Song dynasty)

== Bibliography ==
- Fang, Jian (2001). 范仲淹评传(Fan Zhongyan ping zhuan) [A Critical Biography of Fan Zhongyan]. Critical biography series of Chinese thinkers (1st ed.). Nanjing: Nanjing University Press. ISBN 978-7-305-03657-6.
- Hartman, Charles (2015). Chaffee, John W.; Twitchett, Denis (eds.). The Cambridge history of China. Vol. 5, Part Two: Sung China, 960–1279. Cambridge [Eng.] ; New York: Cambridge University Press. ISBN 978-0-521-24330-8.
- Liu, James T.C. (1957). "An early song reformer: Fan Chung-yen". In Fairbank, John K. (ed.). Chinese Thought and Institution. Chicago: The university of chicago press.
- McGrath, Michael (2009). Twitchett, Denis; Smith, Paul Jakov (eds.). The Cambridge history of China. Vol. 5, Part One: The Sung Dynasty and Its Precursors, 907–1279. Cambridge [Eng.] ; New York: Cambridge University Press. ISBN 978-0-521-21447-6.
