= Zuiwengting Ji =

Semi-autobiographical essay by Ouyang Xiu

Zuiwengting Ji (simplified Chinese: 醉翁亭记; traditional Chinese: 醉翁亭記; pinyin: Zùiwēngtíng Jì; lit. 'An Account of the Old Toper's Pavilion') is a semi-autobiographical essay by Ouyang Xiu (1007–1072 CE). The title refers to himself and the Zuiweng Pavilion (Zuiwengting) near Chuzhou City, Anhui, China. The essay's most well-known line is: The Old Toper cares not for the wine; his interest lies in the landscape (醉翁之意不在酒，在乎山水之間也), an idiom still used in modern Chinese to describe someone with an ulterior motive.

== English translation ==
Around Chu are all mountains, and as for the peaks in its southwest, their forests and valleys are especially beautiful. Looking toward Langye, one sees that it is lush and deeply flowering. Walking into the mountains six or seven li, one gradually hears the chan chan sound of water flowing, streaming out between two peaks. This is the "Brewer's Spring." Returning to the mountain path, there is a pavilion with outstretched wings, which the spring descends toward. This is the Pavilion of the Old Toper. As for who built this pavilion, it was the Buddhist priest of the mountain, Zhi Xian. As for who named it, the Grand Warden named it after himself. The Grand Warden and his guests come here to drink, and drink but a little and are at once intoxicated. As he got older, the Grand Warden gave himself the name "Old Toper." The Old Toper cares not for the wine, his interest lies in the landscape. The happiness of mountains and streams is obtained in the heart and lodged in wine.

Imagine the rising sun and the parting of the forest mist, the return of clouds and the darkening of cliff-side caves. These changes between darkness and brightness are the sunrise and sunset in the mountains. The country fragrance is faintly redolent; fine trees flower and flourish in the shade; the wind is high and the frost is pure; the water level lowers and the riverbed rocks come forth: these are the four seasons amid the mountains. One goes out at sunrise and returns at sunset. The scenes of the four seasons are not the same, and their pleasures are likewise inexhaustible. Those carrying burdens sing along dirt paths, those walking rest under trees. Those in the front call out, and those at the back respond. Hunched over old folks and those leading children by the hand, coming without stopping, these are the outings of the people of Chu. Fishing just before the brook, the stream is deep and the fish are plump. Brewing the spring water into wine, the spring water is fragrant and the wine is pure.

Mountain game meat and wild vegetables are laid out in an assortment for the Grand Warden's feast. The happiness of the feast and drinking has nothing to do with strings and flutes. The shooters of dice hit their mark, and players of Chinese chess are victorious. Wine cups and game tallies cross back and forth, and people sit and stand in an uproar. The multitude of guests is happy. Senile-looking and white-haired, slumped amidst them is the Grand Warden, drunk. Shortly afterwards, the setting sun is behind the mountains and the peoples' shadows scatter disorderly.

The Grand Warden returns and the guests follow. The forest of trees is dark, and the sound of birds is all over: the traveling people have left and the birds are pleased. Naturally, the birds know the pleasures of the mountains and forests, and do not know the happiness of people. People know to take after the happiness of the Warden, but do not know that the happiness of the warden is their own happiness. The Grand Warden is one who can share their happiness when drunk, and can express it in literature when sober. What is the Grand Warden called? He is Ouyang Xiu of Luling.

== See also ==
- Classical Chinese poetry
  - Song poetry
    - Ouyang Xiu
