= Yan Jidao =

Yan Jidao (simplified Chinese: 晏几道; traditional Chinese: 晏幾道; pinyin: Yàn Jǐdào; Wade–Giles: Yen Chi-tao; c. 1030 – c. 1110), art name Xiaoshan, was a song lyrics poet, the youngest son of statesman and poet Yan Shu. In contrast to Yan Shu's prominent official career at the imperial court, Yan Jidao's life remained largely unknown. Most of his songs were created at banquets with the companionship of courtesan. His lasting works can be found in his self-collection of lyrics, titled "Xiaoshan Ci" (小山词). He is considered a master of romance-themed short songs (小令; xiǎolìng) that evoke memories of lost love scenes and past pleasures.

According to his contemporary Huang Tingjian, who wrote a preface to "Xiaoshan Ci", Yan Jidao was a man of "outstanding talent" and "incomparable idiocy". Yan was described as a master of the six classics and schools of the learned; however, he never utilized these abilities to climb the social ladder even when his livelihood is at stake. Huang acclaimed Yan's poetry as "pure and vigorous" that can "deeply stir the mind".

To a notable extent, song lyricists such as Yan Jidao showed a tendency for portraying male vulnerability in response to commonplace feminine beauty, often found in the form of professional performers in private households and taverns rather than the idealized depictions associated with divine or aristocratic women. Among Yan Jidao's 260 songs, the reference of "dreams" appeared in 52 of the lyrics; the once sweet moments of his life spent with the beloved lady singers remained only a reminiscence through dreaming. An example of such a song is “To the tune ‘Partridge Sky’ ”:

鹧鸪天·彩袖殷勤捧玉钟

彩袖殷勤捧玉钟,
当年拚却醉颜红。
舞低杨柳楼心月，
歌尽桃花扇底风。
从别后，
忆相逢。
几回魂梦与君同。
今宵剩把银釭照，
犹恐相逢是梦中。

Translation:
“To the tune ‘Partridge Sky’ ”

Colored sleeves eagerly offered a goblet of jade,
In those years I didn’t mind a face flushed with drink.
She danced the moon down to the willows beside the inn,
And sang till the breeze from her peach blossom fan was stilled.
After we parted,
I always remembered meeting her.
How many times my soul joined her in a dream!
Tonight I keep shining a silver lamp on her,
For fear this meeting is just another dream.

—Ronald Egan
