= Hanlin Academy =

Chinese scholarly institution (708–1911)

- 翰林院
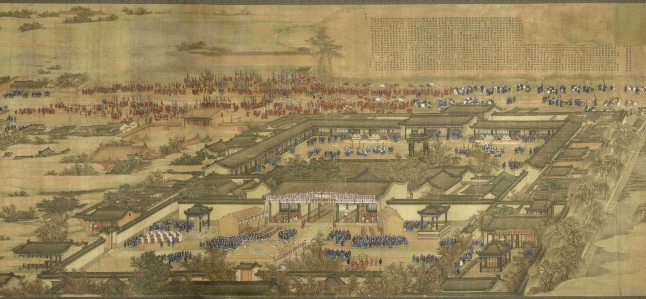
- Active: 708 CE Tang dynasty, reign of Emperor Xuanzong– (June 23, 1900 set on fire by the Gansu Braves); Shut down following the Xinhai Revolution in 1911
- Founders: Emperor Xuanzong
- Location: Chang'an, Luoyang, Beijing, Nanjing

Chinese name
- Simplified Chinese: 翰林院
- Traditional Chinese: 翰林院
Transcriptions
Standard Mandarin
- Hanyu Pinyin: Hànlín Yuàn

The Hanlin Academy was an academic and administrative institution of higher learning founded in the 8th century Tang China by Emperor Xuanzong in Chang'an. It has also been translated as "College of Literature" and "Academy of the Forest of Pencils."

Membership in the academy was confined to an elite group of scholars, who performed secretarial and literary tasks for the court. One of its primary duties was to decide on an interpretation of the Chinese classics. This formed the basis of the Imperial examinations, which aspiring government bureaucrats had to pass to attain higher-level government posts. Painters working for the court were also attached to the academy.

== Academy members ==
Some of the more famous academicians of Hanlin were:

- Li Bai (701–762) – Poet
- Bai Juyi (772–846) – Poet
- Su Shi (1037 – 1101) – Poet
- Yan Shu (991–1055) – Poet, calligrapher, (prime minister, 1042)
- Ouyang Xiu (1007–1072) – Historian
- Shen Kuo (1031–1095) – Chancellor
- Zhang Zeduan (1085–1145) – Painter
- Zhao Mengfu (1254–1322) – Painter, calligrapher, poet (rector, 1314–1320)
- Huang Zicheng (1350–1402) – Imperial scholar
- Li Dongyang (1447–1516) – Imperial officer, poet, served as 'Grand Historian'
- Ni Yuanlu (1593–1644) – Calligrapher, painter, high-ranking official
- Wu Renchen (1628–1689) – Historian and mathematician
- Chen Menglei (1650–1741) – Scholar, writer (Editor in Chief of the Complete Classics Collection of Ancient China)
- Zhang Tingyu (1672–1755) – Politician and historian
- Ji Xiaolan (1724–1805) – Scholar, poet (Editor in Chief of the Complete Library of the Four Treasuries)
- Yao Nai (1731–1815) – Scholar
- Gao E (1738–1815) – Scholar and editor
- He Changling (1785–1848) – Scholar and official
- Zeng Guofan (1811–1872) – Scholar and later key military official
- Chen Lanbin (1816–1895) – Diplomat (ambassador to the U.S., Spain and Peru)
- Weng Tonghe (1830–1904) – Imperial Tutor
- Cai Yuanpei (1868–1940) – Educator
- Qu Hongji (1850–1918) – Politician

== Bureau of Translators ==
Subordinated to the Hanlin Academy was the Bureau of Translators (Chinese: 四夷館/四译館; pinyin: Sìyí Guǎn/Sìyì Guǎn; Wade–Giles: Szu^{4}-i^{2} Kuan^{3}/Szu^{4}-i^{4} Kuan^{3}). Founded by the Ming dynasty in 1407, after the first expedition of Zheng He to the Indian Ocean, the Bureau dealt with the memorials delivered by foreign ambassadors and trained foreign language specialists. It included departments for many languages such as the Jurchen, "Tartar" (Mongol), Korean, Ryukyuan, Japanese, Tibetan, "Huihui" (the "Muslim" language, Persian) Vietnamese and Burmese languages, as well as for the languages of the "various barbarian tribes" (Bai yi 百夷, i.e., Shan ethnic groups on China's southwestern borders), "Gaochang" (people of Turfan, i.e. Old Uyghur language), and Xitian (西天; (Sanskrit, spoken in India). In 1511 and 1579 departments for the languages of Ba bai (八百; Lao) and Thai were added, respectively. A Malay language vocabulary (Manlajia Guan Yiyu) 滿剌加館譯語 (Words-list of Melaka Kingdom) for the Malay spoken in the Malacca Sultanate was compiled. A Cham language vocabulary 占城館 was created for the language spoken in the Champa Kingdom.

When the Qing dynasty revived the Ming-era Bureau of Translators, the Manchus, who "were sensitive to references to barbarians", changed the second character in the bureau's name (四夷館) from yi 夷 "barbarian" to yi 彝 "Yi people", and changed the Shan exonym from Baiyi 百夷 "hundred barbarians" to Baiyi 百譯 "hundred translations".

The later Tongwen Guan that was set up by the Qing dynasty for translating Western languages was subordinated to the Zongli Yamen rather than the Hanlin.

== 1900 fire ==
The Beijing Hanlin Academy and its library were severely damaged in a fire during the Siege of the International Legations in Peking (now known as Beijing) in 1900 by the Kansu Braves while fighting against the Eight-Nation Alliance, close to the British Legation as an intimidation tactic. On June 22-23, the fire spread to the academy:

The old buildings burned like tinder with a roar which drowned the steady rattle of musketry as Tung Fu-shiang's Moslems fired wildly through the smoke from upper windows.

Some of the incendiaries were shot down, but the buildings were an inferno and the old trees standing round them blazed like torches.

An attempt was made to save the famous Yung Lo Ta Tien, but heaps of volumes had been destroyed, so the attempt was given up.

— eyewitness Lancelot Giles, son of Herbert Giles

The flames destroyed many ancient texts.

The academy operated continuously until its closure during the 1911 Xinhai Revolution.

== See also ==
- Academia Sinica
- Academies of Classical Learning
- Chen Cheng (Ming dynasty)
- Chinese Academy of Sciences
- Chinese Academy of Social Sciences
- Education in China
