= Remonstrance Bureau =

Former Chinese government agency

- Traditional Chinese: 諫院
- Simplified Chinese: 谏院
Transcriptions
Standard Mandarin
- Hanyu Pinyin: Jiàn Yuàn

The Remonstrance Bureau was an important government agency during the Song and Jurchen Jin dynasties. It also existed briefly during the Ming dynasty between 1380 and 1382. Its main function was to scrutinize documents between the emperor and the central government (Zhongshu Sheng and Menxia Sheng), and criticize proposals and policy decisions based on moral and propriety reasons.

The office was first created during the Song dynasty in 1017 or 1020, but it only became important after 1032 during Emperor Renzong of Song's reign when it was significantly staffed. Thereafter, the Remonstrance Bureau performed independently of the central government.

== See also ==
- District councils of Hong Kong
- Independent Commission Against Corruption (Hong Kong)
- Office of the Ombudsman (Hong Kong)
- Office of the Privacy Commissioner for Personal Data
- Separation of powers
- Urban Council (Hong Kong) | Regional Council (Hong Kong)
