= New Policies (Song dynasty) =

1059–1076 Chinese reforms by Wang Anshi

Wang Anshi (1021–1086)

The New Policies (Chinese: 新法; pinyin: xīnfǎ), also known as Xining Reforms (熙寧變法; Xining being the first era name used by Emperor Shenzong), Xifeng Reforms (熙豐變法; Xifeng being the portmanteau of the two era names used by Emperor Shenzong, Xining and Yuanfeng) or Wang Anshi Reforms (王安石變法), were a series of reforms initiated by the Northern Song dynasty politician Wang Anshi when he served as minister under Emperor Shenzong from 1069–1076. The policies were in force until the emperor's death, then repealed, then enacted again and were a focus of court politics until the end of the Northern Song. In some ways, it continued the policies of the aborted Qingli Reforms from two to three decades earlier.

== Background ==
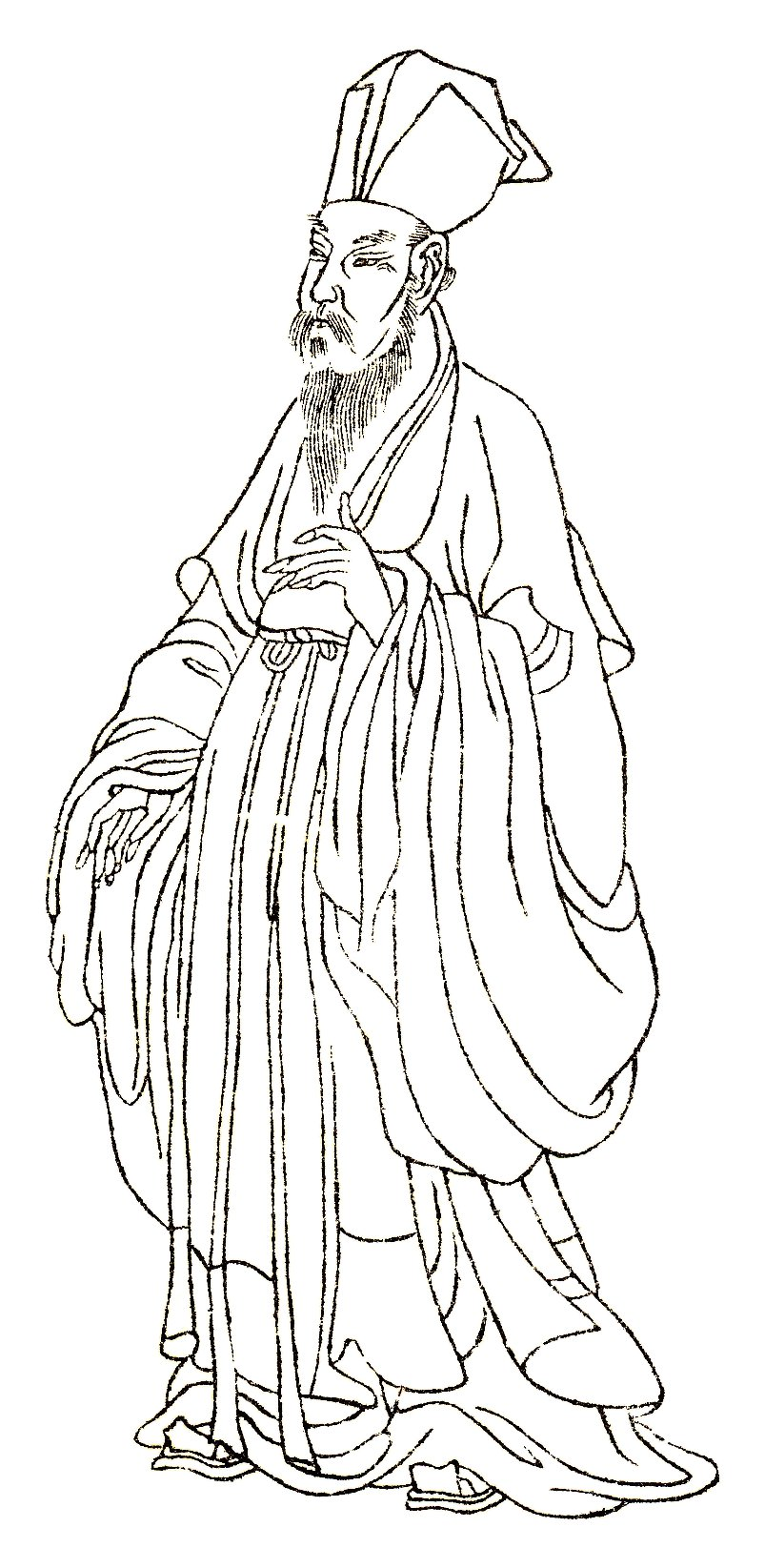
Illustration of Wang Anshi from the Wan Xiao Tang (晩笑堂), 1743.

=== Economic context ===
Government statistics show that in 1034, 80 percent of the Song dynasty's population consisted of rural households. However because the state had given up ownership and distribution of land in the villages and deregulated the markets, the 11th century rural and urban economy saw a great deal of commercialization, privatization of land, and urbanization. Around 40–60 percent of the rural households were small farmers who possessed only 20 percent of cultivated land. They were unable to secure sufficient income to support their families and took out loans from landowners who possessed 80 percent of the land. The interest rate was very high: the government set the ceiling at 100 percent p.a. The beneficiaries, the wealthy landowners, were commonly called jianbing zhijia, which has been translated as plutocrats, engrossers, or exploiters and described as "magnates who preyed on the poor and usurped the fiscal prerogatives of the state."

=== Wang Anshi's career ===
Wang Anshi was born on 8 December 1021, to a family of jinshi degree holders in Linchuan (Fuzhou, Jiangxi province). He placed fourth in the palace exam and obtained a jinshi degree in 1042. He began his career in the Song bureaucracy as a secretary (qianshu) in the office of the assistant military commissioner (jiedu panguan tinggonshi) of Huainan (Yangzhou, Jiangsu province). He was then promoted to district magistrate (zhixian) of Yinxian (Ningbo, Zhejiang province), where he reorganized hydrological projects for irrigation and gave credits to the peasant. Later he was promoted to controller general (tongpan) of Shezhou (Qianshan, Anhui province). In 1060, he was sent to Kaifeng as assistant in the herd office (qunmusi panguan) and then prefect (zhizhou) of Changzhou, commissioner for judificial affairs (tidian xingyu gongshi) in Jiangnan East, assistant in the Financial Commission (sansi duzhi panguan), and finally editor of imperial edicts (zhi zhigao).

Wang's mother died and he observed a mourning period from 1063 to 1066. In 1067, he became governor of Jiangning (Nanjing).

During his time in the local administration, Wang Anshi gained an understanding of the difficulties experienced by local officials and the common people. In 1058, he sent a letter ten thousand characters long (万言书; Wanyanshu/言事书; Yanshishu/上仁宗皇帝言事书; Shang Renzong Huangdi yanshi shu) to Emperor Renzong of Song (r. 1022–1063), in which he suggested reforms to the administration in order to solve financial and organizational problems. In the letter he blamed the downfall of previous dynasties on the refusal of their emperors to deviate from traditional patterns of rule. He criticized the imperial examination system for failing to create specialized workers. Wang believed that there should not be generalists but that people should specialize in their roles and not study extraneous teachings. His letter was ignored for ten years until Emperor Shenzong of Song (r. 1067–1085) succeeded the throne. The new emperor faced declining taxes and an increasingly heavy burden of taxation on commoners due to the development of large estates, whose owners managed to evade paying their share of taxes. This led him to seek advice from Wang in 1069. Wang was first appointed vice counsellor (参知政事; can zhizheng shi), a key position for general administration, and a year later was made chancellor (宰相; zaixiang).

In recent decades, farmers have always lived very hard lives. Government only puts a burden on them but seldom relieves them. Take the capital’s suburbs as example: most of the irrigation projects like dykes and canals have not been maintained; deserted arable lands contiguously stretch for hundreds of square miles; family after family goes bankrupt and is forced to abandon its village and move elsewhere. This is what the situation looks like nearest to us, so we can imagine what it is like in the more remote regions. Once a disaster happens, corpses of victims of starvation are piled one upon the other, and the roads are filled with refugees.

— Wang Anshi

== Objective ==
The primary objectives of Wang Anshi's New Policies (xinfa) were to cut government expenditure and strengthen the military in the north. To do this, Wang advocated for policies intended to alleviate suffering among the peasantry and to prevent the consolidation of large land estates which would deprive small peasants of their livelihood. He called social elements that came between the people and the government jianbing, translated as "engrossers." By "engrossers" he meant people who monopolized land and wealth and made others their dependents in wealth and agriculture. Wang believed that suppressing jianbing was one of the most important goals. Included in the category of jianbing were owners of large estates, rural usurers, large urban businessmen, and speculators responsible for instability in the urban market. All of them had ties to bureaucrats and had representatives in the government.

Today in every prefecture and subprefecture, there are jianbing [engrossing] families that annually collect interest amounting to several myriad strings of cash without doing anything... What contribution have they made to the state to [warrant] enjoying such a good salary?

— Wang Anshi

According to Wang, "good organization of finance was the duty of the government, and the organization of finance was nothing else than to fulfill public duties," and "The state should take the entire management of commerce, industry, and agriculture into its own hands, with a view to succoring the working classes and preventing them from being ground into the dust by the rich." Wang proposed that "to manage wealth the ruler should see public and private [wealth] as a single whole." Wang believed that it was wealth that united the people and if wealth could not be administered properly, then even the lowliest men who did not possess political power would rise to take advantage of the situation, take control of the economy, monopolize it, and use it to advance their unlimited greed. Under such a situation, Wang considered any claim that the emperor had control of the people to be just words.

Above all, Wang saw himself as the defender of family farms and small shopkeepers against rapacious rentier landowners and the great merchant houses, whom he castigated as “aggrandizers.” Wang feared that unbridled market exchange created imbalances in the distribution in wealth and was vulnerable to manipulation by merchant cartels. To forestall such inequities he advocated state intervention in commerce and moneylending. Wang created new state agencies to manage wholesale trade at the capital and provide credit for retail businesses, turned private brokers into government agents, tightened the state’s control of foreign trade, and extended the existing monopoly on salt production to include much tea cultivation as well.

— Richard von Glahn

== Implementation ==
Wang Anshi was promoted to vice counselor in 1069. He served as the sole chief councilor in 1071–1074 and 1075–1076. He introduced and promulgated a series of reforms, collectively known as the New Policies/New Laws. The reforms had three main components: 1) state finance and trade, 2) defense and social order, and 3) education and improving governance.

=== Equal tax law ===
The equal tax law (均税法; junshuifa), also known as the square field law (方田法; fangtianfa) was a land registration project meant to reveal hidden land (untaxed land). Fields were divided into squares 1,000 paces in length on each side. The corners of the fields were marked by earth piles or trees. In the autumn, an official was dispatched to supervise the surveying of the land and to place the soil quality in one of five categories. This information was written in a ledger declared legally binding for the purposes of sale and purchase, and the taxation value assessed appropriately. The law was highly unpopular with land owners, who complained that it restricted their freedom of distribution and other purposes (avoiding tax). Although the square field system was only implemented around the region of Kaifeng, the land surveyed made up 54 percent of known arable land in the Song dynasty. The project was discontinued in 1085. Emperor Huizong of Song (r. 1100–1125) tried to revive it but the implementation was too impractical and gave up after 1120.

The system of taxation for mining products (矿税抽分制; kuangshui difen zhi) was a similar project to the equal tax law, except for regulating mining projects.

=== Green sprouts law ===
The green sprouts law (青苗法; qingmiaofa) was a loan to peasants. The government loaned money to buy seeds, or seeds themselves from state granaries, in two disbursements at an interest rate of 2 percent calculated at an average of ten years. Recollections occurred in the summer and winter. Local officials abused the system by forcing loans on the peasants or extracting more than 2 percent interest.

From the outset the New Policies aroused fierce opposition. Orthodox Confucians condemned the intrusion of state power into the private economy both on principle and because of the deleterious effects of Wang’s initiatives. Perhaps the most vilified initiative was the Green Sprouts program. Critics charged that local officials forced farmers to borrow money from the state, turning the loan program into a regressive tax. It seems that fiscal goals indeed superseded commitments to social welfare. Revenues from the Green Sprouts loan program – which in its early years yielded roughly 3 million guan annually, or a net profit of 27 percent on its capital – were appropriated to finance flood control and famine relief and to provision frontier armies. Despite the lower interest rates, defaults – even after repeated deferrals – were common, and by the 1080s the program began to suffer deficits. The state’s injection of new credit into the rural economy apparently reinforced rather than remedied the perpetual cycle of indebtedness that afflicted many farming families.

— Richard von Glahn

=== Hydraulic works law ===
The hydraulic works law (水利法; shuilifa) was meant to improve local organization of irrigation works. Instead of using corvée labor, each circuit was supposed to appoint officials to loan money to the people using the local treasury, so that they could hire laborers. The government also encouraged planting mulberry trees to increase silk production.

=== Labor recruitment law ===
The labor recruitment law (募役法; muyifa) aimed at replacing corvée labor as a form of tax service with hired labor. Each prefecture calculated the funds needed for official projects in advance so that the funds could be distributed appropriately. The government also paid a premium of 20 percent in years of crop failures. Effectively, it transformed labor service to the government into a monetary payment, increasing tax revenue. However, people who were previously exempt from corvée labor were forced to pay taxes for labor on official projects, and thus protested the new law. Although officially abolished in 1086, the new labor recruitment system existed in practice until the end of the Northern Song dynasty in 1127.

Certainly the New Policies increased government revenues substantially, by at least 18 million guan annually. Tax receipts in coin rose by nearly 40 percent, primarily as a result of the monetization of labor services and the income generated by the Green Sprouts program; commercial sources, apart from the Sichuan tea monopoly, yielded only modest revenues. Although we lack complete figures for national accounts, estimates suggest that money payments reached a peak of 81 percent of central government revenues during the New Policies era, compared to 48 percent c. 1000. At the same time tax receipts in cloth, a staple of state finance since the Eastern Han, virtually disappeared. From this time forward silver essentially replaced textiles in the Song fiscal system, and silk ceased to serve any monetary functions.

— Richard von Glahn

=== Balanced delivery law ===
The balanced delivery law (均输法; junshufa) was meant to curb the prices of commodities purchased by the government and to control the expenditures of the local administration. To do this, the Commissioner of Supply, who was in charge of collecting tributes from the six most prosperous provinces in southeast China, was made responsible for government purchases and their transport. The central treasury provided funds for the purchase of low cost goods wherever there was a surplus, their storage, and transport to areas where they were expensive for sale. Critics claimed that Wang was waging a price war with merchants.

Who can’t afford wedding and funeral
Will be granted loan for relief.
Who faced loss in bad harvest
Will be lent credit to continue undertakings.
Surplus goods will be purchased;
And sold out when it became shortage.

— "The Fourth Out of Nine Fables" by Wang Anshi

=== Market exchange law ===
The market exchange law (市易法; shiyifa), also called the guild avoidance law (免商法; mianshangfa), targeted large trading companies and monopolies. A metropolitan market exchange bureau was set up in Kaifeng and 21 market exchange offices in other cities. They were headed by supervisors and office managers who dealt with merchants, merchant guilds, and brokerage houses. These institutions fixed prices for not only resident merchants but also itinerant traders. Surplus commodities were purchased by the government and stored for later sale at a lower price, disrupting price manipulation by merchant monopolies. Merchant guilds that cooperated with the market exchange bureau were allowed to sell goods to the government and buy commodities from government storehouses using money or credit at an interest rate of 10 percent for six months or 20 percent for a year. Small or mid-sized companies and groups of five merchants could provide guarantee with their assets for credit. After 1085, the market exchange bureau and offices became profit making institutions, and bought cheap goods and sold at higher prices. The system stayed in place until the end of the Northern Song dynasty in 1127.

=== Baojia law ===
The baojia system, also known as the village defense law or security group law, was a project to improve local security and relieve local government of administrative duties. It ordered groups of ten, fifty, and five hundred men security groups to be organized. Each was to be led by a headman. Initially each household with more than two male adults had to provide one security guard, but this unrealistic expectation was decreased to one per five households later on. The security groups exercised police powers, organized night watches, and trained in martial arts when no agricultural work was required. Essentially it was a local militia with the main effect being a decrease in government expenditures, since the local population was responsible for its own protection. In 1075 they were also charged with collecting tax and offering Green Sprouts loans. Wang saw the ultimate goal of the Baojia system as "making farmers and soldiers as one." In some places it sanctioned pre-existing militias while in others it created new ones, but in practice, the baojia was never effective at creating strong fighting troops and it never replaced the imperial army. Still, as a project of social engineering, the baojia measure was transformative, especially in Kaifeng and the North China circuits of Hebei, Hedong (modern Shanxi), and Shaanxi. There, between 19 and 30 percent of households were enfolded into a mandatory program of drill and review that brought the baojia organizations into direct contact with the regular military. By the mid-1080s, the New Policies regime had reshaped rural North China into the model of a hierarchical, bureaucratized, and militarized society, while creating a class of lethally trained rich-peasant baojia captains who wielded the powers of the state over their poorer conscript guardsmen. In the end, then, for North China’s rural elite, baojia mobilization revived the links between military skills and social mobility that the Song state had tried to suppress during the first century of the dynasty.

=== General and troops law ===
The general and troops law (将兵法; jiangbingfa), also known as the creation of commands law (置将法; zhijiangfa) targeted improving the relationship between high officials and common troops. The army was divided into units of 2,500 to 3,000 men that combined a mixed force of infantry, cavalry, archers, as well as tribal troops, instead of each belonging to their own individual unit. This did not include the metropolitan and palace army. The system continued until the end of the Song dynasty.

=== Three college law ===
The three college law (三舍法; sanshefa), also called the Three Hall system, regulated the education of future officials in the Taixue (National University). It divided the Taixue into three colleges. Students first attended the Outer College, then the Inner College, and finally the Superior College. One of the aims of the three-colleges was to provide a more balanced education for students and to de-emphasize Confucian learning. Students were taught in only one of the Confucian classics, depending on the college, as well as arithmetics and medicine. Students of the Outer College who passed a public and institutional examination were allowed to enter the Inner College. At the Inner College there were two exams over a two-year period on which the students were graded. Those who achieved the superior grade on both exams were directly appointed to office equal to that of a metropolitan exam graduate. Those who achieved an excellent grade on one exam but slightly worse on the other could still be considered for promotion, and having a good grade in one exam but mediocre in another still awarded merit equal to that of a provincial exam graduate.

In 1104, the prefectural examinations were abolished in favor of the three-colleges system, which required each prefecture to send an annual quota of students to the Taixue. This drew criticism from some officials who claimed that the new system benefited the rich and young, and was less fair because the relatives of officials could enroll without being examined for their skills. In 1121, the local three-college system was abolished but retained at the national level.

In ancient times, the method for selecting officials depended essentially on schools, which unified people’s morality from above and cultivated customs among the people from below. Talented people could apply their knowledge to state affairs. Yet after the beneficence of the sage-kings was exhausted, the way of teaching no longer followed these fundamental principles. Even though literati possessed talent, they had yet to be perfected since they lacked support from teachers and friends in schools. This is a matter of great concern. Now we wish to revive the ancient institutions and rectify the misdeeds, though it is worried that we do not have a gradual reform plan. The rhyming-couplets and parallel-phrasing style of essay should firstly be eliminated so that students can concentrate on the meanings of the Confucian Classics. In the meantime the court should build schools, after which we can deliberate the ways to restore the methods of education and selection under the Three Dynasties. When education is made universal, we shall have approached the goal of restoring antiquity.

— Wang Anshi

=== Imperial Examination restructuring ===
The New Policies drastically changed the curriculum of the imperial examinations. The "understanding the Classics" and "various field" degrees were abolished. Poetry, memory passages, and written elucidations were removed; candidates were to instead demonstrate mastery of the Analects, the Mencius, and one of the Five Classics. The Spring and Autumn Annals were excluded due to their low contemporary political value. To emphasize legal expertise, the "new degree in law" was introduced in 1071. These reforms were intended to be more relevant, promote critical thinking, and increase support for the New Policies. The examination reforms disrupted the studies of many candidates and were thus quickly repealed following Emperor Shenzong's death.

== Opposition ==
=== Opposition leaders ===
The reforms created political factions in the court. Wang Anshi's faction, known as the "Reformers", were opposed by the ministers in the "Conservative" faction led by the historian and Chancellor Sima Guang (1019–1086). As one faction supplanted another in the majority position of the court ministers, it would demote rival officials and exile them to govern remote frontier regions of the empire. One of the prominent victims of the political rivalry, the famous poet and statesman Su Shi (1037–1101), was jailed and eventually exiled for criticizing Wang's reforms.

One point of contention over the New Policies was fiscal management. Wang made it clear that he was not concerned about deficits and promised the emperor that revenues would be adequate even without increasing taxes. Sima did not agree and did not believe that the economy could grow faster than the population. Sima was concerned with the breakdown of the boundary between institutional responsibilities and the private domain. While Wang attacked the power of private wealth, Sima defended the rich as socially and politically useful. Wang was also in favor of more aggressive foreign policy such as recovering territory and assimilating people to the northwest while Sima preferred a more balanced foreign policy. Sima did not believe that managing wealth was a core function of the government or that it was in their best interests to help those dependent on the rich. He saw that as the breakdown of social order which would cause the eventual downfall of the state. Sima did not even like the imperial examinations and argued that only candidates recommended by court officials should be able to sit the examinations. Essentially, Sima Guang believed that government was the domain of the pre-existing elite and only the elite.

- Ouyang Xiu (1007–1072) – statesman formerly recommended by Wang
- Sima Guang (1019–1086) – scholar-official and leader of the Conservatives in the north
- Su Shi (1036–1101) and Su Che (1039–1112) – brothers and leaders of the southwest in modern Sichuan
- Fu Bi (1004–1083) – statesman responsible for the Qingli Reforms
- Han Qi (1008–1075)
- Lü Gongzhu (1018–1089) – leader of prominent political families who had formerly praised and befriended Wang
- Zheng Xia (1041–1119) – former student and supporter of Wang

=== Decline ===
The Green Sprouts program and the baojia system were not conceived as revenue-generating policies but soon were changed to finance new state initiatives and military campaigns. Within a few months of the start of the Green Sprouts program in 1069 the government started to charge an annual interest of 20–30% on the loans it made to farmers. As the officials of the Ever-Normal Granaries who were managing the program were evaluated based on the revenue they could generate, this resulted in forced loans and lack of focus on the disaster relief, which was the original task of the Ever-Normal Granaries.

In 1074, a famine in northern China drove many farmers off their lands. Their circumstances were made worse by the debts they had incurred from the seasonal loans granted under Wang’s reform initiatives. Local officials insisted on collecting the loans as the farmers were leaving their land. This crisis was depicted as being Wang’s fault. Wang still had the emperor's favor, though he resigned in 1076. With the emperor's death in 1085 and the return of the opposition leader Sima Guang, the New Policies were abolished under the regency of Dowager Empress Gao. With Sima back in power, he blamed the New Policies' implementation on Shenzong's wish to extend Song borders to match the Han and Tang dynasties, that they were only a tool for irredentism. The pro-New policies faction regained power when Emperor Zhezong (r. 1085–1100) came of age in 1093. The policies largely continued under the reign of Emperor Huizong until the end of the Northern Song dynasty in 1126.

Following the deaths of Wang Anshi and Shenzong in 1085, Wang’s enemies came to power and began to dismantle his reforms in the name of fiscal austerity. In 1093, however, proponents of the New Policies regained control of the court and revived the reform agenda. But incompetent leadership, a deteriorating military situation, and factional struggles at the court resulted in increasingly erratic fiscal policies and predatory taxation that inflicted enormous damage on the economy. The rapid collapse of the Song state in the face of the Jurchen invasion in 1126 was widely blamed on the fiscal mismanagement and private venality of Wang Anshi’s self-anointed disciples. The refugee court that reconstituted Song rule in South China after the fall of Kaifeng in 1127 repudiated Wang Anshi’s political philosophy and repealed most of the New Policies. But the powerful presence of the fiscal state endured.

— Richard von Glahn

== Anti-reform period (1085–1093) ==
From 1085–1093, the Song government went through an anti-reform period. Many of the New Policies were rescinded or drastically altered. Supporters of the New Policies were denounced. Even those who were against the New Policies but did not favor a sudden swing to the extreme such as Fan Chunren, Su Shi, and Su Che were dismissed. After Sima Guang died in 1086, power was left in the hands of Lü Gongzhu, Lü Dafang (1028–1097), and Liu Zhi (1030–1097).

== Post-reform period (1093–1125) ==
After Dowager Empress Gao died in 1093 and Emperor Zhezong came of age, New Policies supporters were recalled and put in power. These included Zhang Chun (1034–1105) (should be Zhang Dun 章惇), Wang Anshi's son-in-law Cai Bian, and his brother Cai Jing (1046–1126). Many of the New Policies were revived and extended in geographical extent. The Conservative faction suffered political persecution and exiled to local government posts far away. During the early reign of Emperor Huizong (r. 1100–1126), one of Wang's early associates, Zeng Bu, tried to reconcile the Reformers and Conservatives by recommending some of the latter to high offices. This short-lived policy, known as "Establishment of a Middle Course", failed to please either factions.

Cai Jing remained in power from 1101 to 1125, two years before the Northern Song was ended by the Jin invasion and capture of Kaifeng, known as the Jingkang Incident. Cai intensified political persecution of the Conservatives. There was increasing corruption and deterioration of the government under his administration, marring the New Policies with criticisms identified with the fall of the dynasty.

== Legacy ==
In China Wang Anshi is generally seen as a practical failure. From a Chinese Marxist perspective he was a reformer.

In 1944, Henry A. Wallace called Wang Anshi a "Chinese New Dealer who lived about 900 years ago." Wang's economic policies have been compared to Keynesian economics and described as "proto-Keynesian economic policy."

It was ten years ago that I learned for the first time about ... Wang Anshi. Under very great difficulties he was faced in the year of 1068 with problems which, allowing for the difference between historical periods, were almost identical with the problems met by Franklin D. Roosevelt in 1933. The methods which he employed were strikingly similar.

— Henry A. Wallace

== Bibliography ==
- Bol, Peter K. (1992), This Culture of Ours, Stanford University Press, ISBN 9780804765756
- Chu, Ming-kin (2020), The Politics of Higher Education, Hong Kong University Press, ISBN 9789888528196
- Drechsler, Wolfgang (2013), "Wang Anshi and the origins of modern public management in Song Dynasty China", Public Money & Management, 33 (5): 353–360, doi:10.1080/09540962.2013.817125, S2CID 153625951
- von Glahn, Richard (2016), The Economic History of China: From Antiquity to the Nineteenth Century
- Liu, James T.C. (1959), Reform in Sung China
- Lorge, Peter (2005), War, Politics, and Society in Early Modern China, 900-1795, Routledge
- Sivin, Nathan (1995a), Science in Ancient China. Researches and Reflections, Variorum Collected Studies Series, Aldershot, Hants: Variorum
- Sivin, Nathan (1995b), Medicine, Philosophy and Religion in Ancient China. Researches and Reflections, Variorum Collected Studies Series, Aldershot, Hants: Variorum
- Smith, Paul Jakov (2006), "Shuihu zhuan and the Military Subculture of the Northern Song, 960-1127", Harvard Journal of Asiatic Studies, 66 (3): 363–422
- Smith, Paul Jakov (2009), "Shen-tsung's Reign and the New Policies of Wang An-shih, 1067-1085," Denis Twitchett and Paul Jakov Smith, The Cambridge History of China Volume 5 Part One: The Sung Dynasty and its Precursors, 907-1279. Cambridge University Press. ISBN 978-0-521-81248-1.
- Zhao, Xuan (2017), Wang Anshi's economic reforms: proto-Keynesian economic policy in Song China
- Chaffee, John; Twitchett, Denis (2015). The Cambridge History of China Volume 5 Part Two: Sung China, 960–1279. Cambridge University Press. ISBN 978-0-521-81248-1.
