= Serenade of Peaceful Joy =

2020 Chinese historical series

- Promotional poster
- Also known as: Held in the Lonely Castle
- Traditional Chinese: 清平樂
- Simplified Chinese: 清平乐
- Hanyu Pinyin: Qīngpíng Lè
- Genre: Historical fiction; Political
- Based on: The Lonely City (孤城闭) by Milan Lady (米兰Lady)
- Written by: Zhu Zhu
- Directed by: Zhang Kaizhou
- Starring: Wang Kai; Jiang Shuying
- Opening theme: Wish Song by Hu Xia
- Ending theme: Searching Light by Zheng Yunlong; Two Flying Birds by Cui Zige; Tender Peach by Shuang Sheng
- Country of origin: China
- Original language: Mandarin
- No. of seasons: 1
- No. of episodes: 69

Production
- Executive producer: Hou Hongliang
- Production location: Hengdian World Studios
- Camera setup: Multi-camera
- Running time: 40–45 minutes
- Production companies: Daylight Entertainment (Dongyang) Television Ltd; China Wit Media Co. Ltd

Original release
- Network: Hunan TV; Tencent Video; WeTV (international)
- Release: April 7 – May 18, 2020

Serenade of Peaceful Joy (Chinese: 清平乐; pinyin: Qīngpíng Lè) is a 2020 Chinese television series loosely based on the novel The Lonely City by Milan Lady. It is directed by Zhang Kaizhou, and stars Wang Kai as Emperor Renzong of Song and Jiang Shuying as Empress Cao. The series aired from April 7 to May 18, 2020.

== Synopsis ==
When Emperor Renzong discovers his biological mother is not Empress Dowager Liu, but her maid Li Lanhui, he arranges a marriage between his beloved daughter Princess Fukang and the Li family's son Li Wei as compensation for his lack of filial piety.

In the political arena, the Emperor strives to maintain a balance of power between the conservative and progressive factions after the Qingli Reforms experiences a significant backlash from the former.

Inside the palace, Emperor Renzong faces the dutiful Empress Cao, the troublesome Consort Zhang and the gentle Consort Miao. As time passed, none of his sons survive past childhood, leaving him without a male heir.

Outside the palace, Princess Fukang's married life with Li Wei is far from pleasant — displeased with her foolish and boring husband, and annoyed by her prying in-laws, she develops a close relationship with her eunuch Liang Huaiji. After a serious dispute with her husband's family, the Princess knowingly breaks the law by charging back to the palace the same night. The next day, conservative official Sima Guang presents a scathing memorial to Emperor Renzong, heavily criticizing Princess Fukang for her selfishness and violation of imperial etiquette.

The Emperor had always encouraged freedom of speech and supported a supervisory system that would maintain disciplinary surveillance over bureaucrats and the imperial clan, and must ultimately choose between his daughter's happiness and the stability of the government.

== Cast ==
=== Main ===
- Wang Kai as Emperor Renzong
  - Personal name Zhao Zhen. A benevolent and merciful ruler who would bring about one of the most economically and culturally prosperous eras of the Song dynasty. However, he encounters much backlash from conservative officials while trying to implement the progressive Qingli Reforms.
- Jiang Shuying as Empress Cao
  - Personal name Cao Dansu. An empress who abides by her duties but is distrusted by the Emperor due to the power her relatives wield in court and because she reminds him of the Empress Dowager.

=== Supporting ===
==== Imperial Family ====
- Ren Min as Princess Fukang
  - Personal name Zhao Huirou. The Emperor's beloved daughter. Unable to deal with the suffocating atmosphere in the Princess' Mansion, she develops romantic affection towards her eunuch Liang Huaiji and her rebellious actions lead to an uproar in court.
- Wu Yue as Empress Dowager Liu
  - Personal name Liu E. The regent of the empire for twelve years and the Emperor's adoptive mother. She sincerely loves him but is aware that their relationship is cold and cordial.
- Wang Churan as Noble Consort Zhang
  - Personal name Zhang Bihan. One of the best dancers in the palace. She met the Emperor as a child and fell in love with him ever since — even though he has forgotten. She can't adjust to life in the inner palace and grows paranoid, convinced that everyone is against her.
- Xu Lingyue as Noble Consort Miao
  - Personal name Miao Xinhe, nickname Wo'er. The mother of Zhao Huirou and Zhao Zuigxinglai, and the Emperor's childhood sweetheart. She deeply cares about her children's well-being while also developing a rivalry with Consort Zhang. She's a close friend of the Empress.
- Xu Xiao Han as Lady Xu
  - Personal name Xu Lantiao. Originally a maid, she holds a grudge against Nanny Gu due to her favoritism toward Consort Zhang.
- Liu Zihe as Lady Yu
  - Consort Miao's friend who also despises Consort Zhang.
- Wang Yuchao as Emperor Yingzong
  - Personal name Zhao Zongshi. Adopted son of the Empress and a member of the imperial clan. He was Princess Fukang's childhood companion and friend.
- Yang Yue as Empress Guo
  - An outspoken and fierce woman who was chosen by the Empress Dowager to become empress. She sincerely loves the Emperor, but her hot-headed personality leads to her deposition.
- Xiao Yifen as Ninth Princess
- Qian Jin as Tenth Princess
- Zhao Da as Prince of Zhou
- Lu Xing as Li Wei
  - Princess Fukang's husband.

==== Imperial Court ====
- Yang Le as Han Qi
  - Chancellor of the empire for a decade and one of the officials responsible for the Qingli Reforms.
- Yu Entai as Yan Shu
  - Renowned poet and calligrapher.
- Liu Jun as Fan Zhongyan
  - An official who advocated for sweeping reforms of the court and political system, and proposed the changes that kickstarted the Qingli Reforms along with Han Qi and Fu Bi.
- Li Yanan as Fu Bi
  - Close colleague of Fan Zhongyan and Han Qi.
- Zhang Benyu as Ouyang Xiu
- Feng Hui as Xia Song
- Tan Xihe as Lu Yijian
- Chen Weidong as Wen Yanbo
- Chu Junchen as Sima Guang
- Ji Chen as Di Qing
- Ding Jiawen as Cao Ping
- He Jianze as Bao Zheng
- Yang Shuo as Shi Jie
- He Minghan as Wang Gongchen
- Zhao Haoyuan as Su Shunqi
- Yu Peishan as Cao Yi

==== Servants ====
- Bian Cheng as Liang Huaiji
  - An eunuch who has served Princess Fukang since a young age, and later develops romantic affection for her.
- Ye Zuxin as Zhang Maoze
  - Head eunuch. The Emperor and Empress' close aide. He has an unrequited love for the Empress, but is willing to bury his feelings and simply be a confidante.
- Cao Xiwen as Nanny Gu
  - Consort Zhang's mother figure. She contributes to the paranoia that sets Consort Zhang against the Empress and Consort Miao.
- Chu Feng as Ren Shouzhong
- Hu Shuangquan as Liang Quanyi
- Liu Xizi as Zhang Chengzhao
- Zhang Xiaoyue as Xiu Niang
- Wang Xiao as Gu Sanxi

==== Others ====
- Zhang Tian'ai as Chen Xichun
  - The Emperor's first love who was sent away due to being unfit to be empress.
- Guo Hong as Lady Yang
- Li Jiaxin as Fu Ruolan
  - Fu Bi's daughter.
- Wu Xiaoyu as Xue Yuhu
- Jin Yiying as Jia Qingzi
- Tian Luhan as Huan'er
- Bu Yaping as Cao Ping's wife
- He Yuxiao as Prince of Yan's grandson
- Feng Youran as Bitao
- Ma Yixun as Yan Jidao
- Hu Haobo as Liang Yuansheng
- Li Peize as Man Jidao
- Hou Mingyao as Xia He

== Production ==
Principal photography commenced on January 5, 2019 at Hengdian World Studios.

=== Casting ===
On November 8, 2018, Wang Kai was announced as the male lead, and the director confirmed that the focus of the drama would be on the emperor's reign, while still keeping the original romance between Princess Fukang and Liang Huaiji intact. On December 7, 2018, the rest of the cast was announced. In May 2019, the drama wrapped up filming and announced guest appearances by several actors.

== Original soundtrack ==
The original soundtrack album was released on April 30, 2020, and was produced by Meng Ke and Lu Liang. The compilation album of the ending themes was released on May 1, 2020, and was produced by Dong Yingda.

| No. | Title | Lyrics | Music | Singer | Length |
|---|---|---|---|---|---|
| 1. | "Wish Song (愿歌行)" (Opening theme) | Zhang Jingyi; Zhu Zhu | Liu Xuandou | Hu Xia | 3:44 |
| 2. | "Seeking Light (寻光)" (Ending theme; 6–10, 18–24, 31–36, 55–62) | Dong Yingda; Zhu Zhu | Dong Yingda | Zheng Yunlong | 4:07 |
| 3. | "Two Flying Swallows (双飞燕)" (Ending theme; 1–5, 11–17, 25–30, 37–42, 50–54, 68–69) | Zhu Zhu; Dong Yingda | Dong Yingda | Cui Zige | 3:48 |
| 4. | "Tender Peach (桃夭)" (Ending theme; 43–49, 63–67) | Zhang Jingyi | Liu Xuandou | Shuang Sheng | 4:21 |

== Ratings ==
- Highest ratings are marked in red, lowest ratings are marked in blue

Hunan TV CSM59 City ratings
| Air date | Episode | Ratings (%) | Audience share (%) | Timeslot rank |
|---|---|---|---|---|
| April 7, 2020 | 1–2 | 2.294 | 7.91 | 2 |
| April 8, 2020 | 3–4 | 2.216 | 7.57 | 3 |
| April 9, 2020 | 5–6 | 2.365 | 8.01 | 3 |
| April 10, 2020 | 7 | 2.562 | 8.15 | 1 |
| April 11, 2020 | 8 | 2.45 | 7.74 | 1 |
| April 12, 2020 | 9–10 | 2.751 | 9.31 | 1 |
| April 13, 2020 | 11–12 | 2.562 | 8.77 | 1 |
| April 14, 2020 | 13–14 | 2.699 | 9.27 | 1 |
| April 15, 2020 | 15–16 | 2.798 | 9.62 | 1 |
| April 16, 2020 | 17–18 | 2.69 | 9.23 | 1 |
| April 17, 2020 | 19 | 2.292 | 7.46 | 2 |
| April 18, 2020 | 20 | 2.123 | 6.71 | 3 |
| April 19, 2020 | 21–22 | 2.684 | 9.04 | 1 |
| April 20, 2020 | 23–24 | 3.068 | 10.53 | 1 |
| April 21, 2020 | 25–26 | 2.742 | 9.6 | 1 |
| April 22, 2020 | 27–28 | 2.793 | 9.66 | 1 |
| April 23, 2020 | 29–30 | 2.935 | 10.55 | 1 |
| April 25, 2020 | 31 | 1.926 | 6.43 | 2 |
| April 26, 2020 | 32–33 | 2.874 | 10.31 | 1 |
| April 27, 2020 | 34–35 | 2.428 | 8.78 | 1 |
| April 28, 2020 | 36–37 | 2.397 | 8.68 | 1 |
| April 29, 2020 | 38–39 | 2.316 | 8.49 | 2 |
| April 30, 2020 | 40–41 | 2.615 | 9.54 | 1 |
| May 1, 2020 | 42–43 | 2.407 | 8.80 | 1 |
| May 2, 2020 | 44 | 1.834 | 6.78 | 2 |
| May 4, 2020 | 45–46 | 2.593 | 9.46 | 1 |
| May 5, 2020 | 47–48 | 2.552 | 9.23 | 1 |
| May 6, 2020 | 49–50 | 2.458 | 9.08 | 1 |
| May 7, 2020 | 51–52 | 2.26 | 8.31 | 1 |
| May 8, 2020 | 53 | 2.741 | 9.55 | 1 |
| May 9, 2020 | 54 | 1.521 | 5.53 | 3 |
| May 10, 2020 | 55–56 | 1.573 | 5.87 | 3 |
| May 11, 2020 | 57–58 | 2.032 | 7.54 | 2 |
| May 12, 2020 | 59–60 | 2.184 | 8.27 | 1 |
| May 13, 2020 | 61–62 | 1.938 | 7.15 | 2 |
| May 14, 2020 | 63–64 | 2.147 | 7.92 | 1 |
| May 15, 2020 | 65 | 1.806 | 6.38 | 3 |
| May 16, 2020 | 66 | 1.890 | 6.91 | 2 |
| May 17, 2020 | 67–68 | 2.198 | 8.08 | 2 |
| May 18, 2020 | 69 | 2.563 | 9.79 | 1 |
