= Su Dongpo (TV series) =

- DVD cover
- Genre: historical fiction
- Written by: Leng Chengjin
- Directed by: Wang Wenjie
- Starring: Lu Yi; Ruby Lin
- Country of origin: China
- Original language: Mandarin
- No. of episodes: 44

Production
- Producer: Sun Yuehong
- Production location: Hengdian World Studios
- Running time: 45 minutes
- Production company: China Central Television

Su Dongpo is a 2012 Chinese historical TV series produced by China Central Television. It was first shown in 2012, although it was filmed in 2007.

The biopic stars Lu Yi as Su Shi, also known as Su Dongpo.

== Cast ==
- Lu Yi as Su Shi
- Song haolin as Su Zhe
- Niu Piao as: Su Xun
- Ruby Lin as Wang Fu
- Han Yuqin as Wang Runzhi
- Sarina as Grand Empress Dowager Cao
- Li Qiang as Emperor Renzong of Song
- He Wei as Wang Anshi
- Liu Wenzhi as Sima Guang
- Shen Junyi as Fan Zheng
- Wang Shihuai as Ouyang Xiu
- Yang Dong as Chao Gu
- Wang Xiaochen as Wang Chaoyun
- Liu Changchun as Zhang Chun
- Zhao Jin as Zhang Zao
- Zhao Chao as Emperor Shenzong of Song
- Wang Li as Emperor Zhezong of Song
- Li Feng as Qin Guan
- Xue Zhongrui as Han Qi
- Liu Yulin as Wang Gui
- Guo Donglin as Foyin
- Shi Yao as Grand Empress Dowager Gao
- Liu Yajin as Cai Jing
- Zhou Bo as Cai Bian
- Zhang Jinghai as Cai Que
- Yang Yaxing as Yang Xiaolian
- Jiang Zhigang as Su Mai
- Gao Dai as Su Dai
- Jin Hanning as Su Guo
- Xia Zhixiang as Cheng Yi
- Zhang Guisheng as Chen Xiliang
- Song Song as Chen Zao
- Xia Dandan as Liu Yue'e
- Peng Gang as Zeng Gong
- Zhao Yiran as Zeng Bu
- Li Dongsheng as Wu Fugu
- Chen Yongjian as Huang Tingjian
- Yu Hongzhou as Wang Gong
- Zhang Jing as Shi Yun
- Shang Tielong as Li Ding
- Wang Zhongdao as Lü Dafang
- Zhang Daning as Canliaozi
- Han Jianguang as Zhang Maoze
- Dai Ming as Zhao Bian
- Deng Lin as Lü Huiqing
- Xu Feng as Fan Chunren
- Huo Ercha as Liu Zhi
- Zhang Yuanrong as Deng Wan
- Bao Hailong as Wang Shen
- Li Zhu as Mi Fu
- Ding Jianjun as Lü Hui
- Deng Ming as Wang Yansou
- Sun Decheng as Hu Su
- Hou Di as Liu Ji
- Hu Zhanli as Wang Di
- Wang Xiang as Shu Dan
- Li Sa as Liang Weijian
- Zhang Junjie as Wang Peng
- Pan Xiaoqian as Xu Junyou
- Hou Taop as Wu Gui
- Guo Yan as Cao Yong
- Song Yu as Wang Er
- Tao Jisi as Qu Guinian
- Ang Yang as Wang Xi
- Wang Bo as Mai Ziqing
- Jia Mengdai as Azhu
- Chang Hong as Fan Ying
