= Zhang Maoze =

Zhang Maoze (张茂则; 1015–1094), courtesy name Pingfu (平甫), was a senior imperial eunuch of the northern Song dynasty. He was a native of Kaifeng, Henan. He lived to 79 years old, and served four emperors including Emperor Renzong, Emperor Yingzong, Emperor Shenzong, and Emperor Zhezong. He was considered a capable, loyal, and virtuous personnel within the imperial court. His life and career can be traced primarily through a biography section in the History of Song and Xu Zizhi Tongjian Changbian.

== Life and career ==
Zhang Maoze started off as a minor eunuch (小黄门, Xiao Huangmen) and was promoted multiple times, eventually raised to the highest ranking eunuch official.

During Emperor Renzong's reign, one night, a thief broke into the palace, Zhang was the first to enter the room and captured the thief, leading to his promotion to head of the Imperial Medicine Institute.

When Emperor Renzong was sick and bedridden, Zhang was summoned in the middle of the night. When some palace attendants wanted to close the palace gates, Zhang said, "There is nothing to fear. Why cause unnecessary suspicion inside and outside the palace?" Emperor Renzong wanted to promote him to the position of Marshal of the Court, but Zhang requested an outside post and was appointed military supervisor of Yongxing Army. Later, Zhang returned to court and served as a senior eunuch officer and deputy director of internal affairs.

During the early years of Emperor Shenzong's reign, Zhang, along with Sima Guang, inspected flood embankments in Enzhou, Jizhou, Shenzhou, Yingzhou, and the Liuta and Ergou Rivers. He was further promoted in ranking.

On the night of a Shangyuan Festival, a fire broke out in the palace, Zhang led the efforts to extinguish it in time, and Emperor Shenzong awarded him with a narrow-sleeved robe and a gold embroidered belt.

At the later stage of his career, Zhang repeatedly requested retirement, stating that he had received too many provisions from the state and asked to destroy the food vouchers he hadn't claimed for seven years. When Emperor Zhezong ascended the throne, Zhang was promoted to the highest ranking of eunuch officers. He died at the age of 79.

During Emperor Zhezong's Shaosheng era, Zhang was posthumously demoted as part of the crackdown on the Yuanyou faction. During Emperor Huizong's Chongning reign, he was formally registered as a member of the Yuanyou faction.

== Anecdotes ==
During the Zhihe era (1054–1056), Emperor Renzong fell gravely ill. Prime Minister Fu Bi secretly communicated with Empress Cao on the selection of the royal heir. Empress Cao favored Zhao Zongshi (later known as Emperor Yingzong). Zhang Maoze acted as the intermediary, conveying messages between them.

In the first year of Renzong's Jiayou era (1056–1063), the emperor fell ill. The ministers went to the inner court to inquire on his wellbeing. The emperor suddenly rushed out from his inner chambers and shouted loudly, "The Empress (Empress Cao) and Zhang Maoze are plotting treason!" His words were extremely incoherent. Upon hearing this, Zhang Maoze immediately attempted to hang himsel, but were stopped by the attendants on presence. The prime minister Wen Yanbo, scolded him, saying, "The emperor is ill, and his words are nothing more than delirium caused by sickness. Why would you act so rashly? If you died, how could the Empress hold herself?" He then ordered Zhang Maoze to remain in attendance on the emperor and not leave his side without permission.

Prime Minister Wang Anshi once attempted to enter the inner court on horseback. The palace attendants tried to stop him, but the horse did not halt. Zhang Maoze shouted loudly to stop them and ordered the attendants to punish the person driving the horse. The driver argued, "This is the Prime Minister's horse, why shouldn't it be allowed?" Zhang Maoze responded, "The Prime Minister is still a subject of the emperor; how can he ride a horse into the inner chamber? Does he intend to become like Wang Mang?

== In popular fiction ==
Zhang Maoze was portrayed by Ye Zuxin in 2020 TV drama series Serenade of Peaceful Joy.

== Bibliography ==
- Li, Tao (1182). "續資治通鑑長編". wiki Source Chinese 维基文库.
