= Empress Dowager Gao =

Empress Dowager Gao may refer to:

- Empress Gao (Xuanwu) (died 518), empress of the Northern Wei dynasty
- Empress Gao (Song dynasty) (1032–1093), empress of the Song dynasty

== See also ==
- Empress Gao (disambiguation)
