= Empress Dowager Cao =

Empress Dowager Cao (曹太后) may refer to:

- Empress Dowager Cao (Li Cunxu's mother) (died 925), empress dowager of Later Tang during the reign of Li Cunxu
- Empress Cao (Li Siyuan's wife) (died 937), empress dowager of Later Tang during the reigns of Li Conghou and Li Congke
- Empress Cao (Song dynasty) (1016–1079), empress consort and empress dowager of the Song dynasty

== See also ==
- Empress Cao (disambiguation)
