= Su Dongpo (disambiguation) =

Su Shi (1037–1101), also known as Su Dongpo, was a Chinese poet, essayist, calligrapher, painter, scholar-official, literatus, artist, pharmacologist, and gastronome who lived during the Song dynasty.

Su Dongpo may also refer to:

- Su Dongpo (1994 TV series), Chinese TV series starring Sun Song
- The Poet Su Dong Po, 2001 Hong Kong TV series starring Kent Cheng
- Su Dongpo (2012 TV series), Chinese TV series starring Lu Yi

== See also ==
- Dongpo (disambiguation)
