= Oh My General =

- Genre: Historical fiction Romantic comedy Gender bender
- Based on: General Above I Am Below by Juhua Sanli
- Written by: Shichen Gongzi
- Directed by: Wen Jiehe; Huo Yaoliang
- Starring: Ma Sichun; Sheng Yilun
- Country of origin: China
- Original language: Mandarin
- No. of episodes: 60

Production
- Producer: Jin Yifei
- Production locations: Hengdian World Studios; Xiangshan Film City; Inner Mongolia; Ningxia; Gansu
- Running time: 45 mins
- Production companies: Shanghai Xinge Media; Youku
- Budget: ¥300 million

Original release
- Network: Youku
- Release: 25 October 2017

Oh My General (Chinese: 将军在上) is a 2017 Chinese streaming television series starring Ma Sichun and Sheng Yilun. It is adapted from the novel General Above I Am Below (Chinese: 将军在上我在下) by Ju Hua San Li. Set against the backdrop of the Song dynasty, the gender bender series tells the story of the marriage between a highly skilled female general and a prince of unrivaled beauty. The series aired on Youku starting 25 October 2017.

== Synopsis ==
During the Song Dynasty, Ye Zhao becomes a soldier of outstanding ability. Only a select few outside Zhao's immediate family know that Zhao is actually female, having been disguised as a boy since childhood. She was dressed and taught like a boy to allow her to accompany, and eventually join, her family of warriors. When her father and brother died in an invasion, she took over control of the Ye army to defend her home, eventually receiving a top rank of general. The series begins with Zhao's promotion to general, and her true gender being revealed to the Imperial court soon after.

The Empress Dowager worries about Ye Zhao holding too much power, and uses the revelation of Zhao's gender to bethroth Ye Zhao to a nephew of the Emperor and force her to move to the capital to be controlled. Her fiancé is the Prince of Nanping, Zhao Yujin, who possesses remarkable beauty but is sickly, pampered, lazy and spends his time on "useless" artistic pursuits. Thus, the story of the real battle of who will take power in this new household begins.

== Cast ==
=== Main ===
- Ma Sichun as Ye Zhao
  - A woman warrior with supreme martial arts skills. Disguised as a man, she took her father's place in the army, then became an accomplished general.
- Sheng Yilun as Zhao Yujin
  - Emperor Renzong's nephew - a man who is known for his supreme beauty. Despite his good looks, he is spoiled, lazy, and weak; spending most of his time gambling and frequenting brothels with his hedonistic friends. After falling in love with Ye Zhao, Yujin slowly transforms himself into a strong and capable man.

=== Supporting ===
==== People around Ye Zhao ====
- Ding Chuan as Hu Qing
  - Ye Zhao's military strategist who has been by her side since he was eighteen. He has a one-sided love for Ye Zhao.
- Wang Churan as Liu Xiyin
  - Ye Zhao's cousin. She has no idea that Ye Zhao is a female and has a one-sided love for her. Later on, she became the fiancé of the Crown Prince of Western Xia.
- Lu Xingyu as Ye Zhong
- Wang Li as Qiu Laohu
- Wang Xuan as Qiu Hua
- Pan Shiqi as Qiu Shui

==== People around Zhao Yujin ====
- Zhang Jiayi as Zhang Gui
  - Noble Consort Zhang's brother. Zhao Yujin's friend.
- Xiang Hao as Guo Yuanjing
  - The Empress's nephew. Zhao Yujin's friend.
- Yu Bo as Fan Zhongyan
  - A minister who is loyal to the country but is constantly slighted despite his earnest attitude. Zhao Yujin's good friend.
- An Yongchang as Concubine Yang
- Zhang Xinying as Meiniang
- Zheng Shuhan as Xuaner
- Zhang Zhilü as Xiao Xiazi
  - Zhao Yujin's study companion.

==== Imperial Family ====
- Song Yunhao as Emperor Zhenzong
- Tien Niu as the Empress Dowager
- Lu Fangsheng as the Emperor Renzong
- Zhu Yongteng as the Prince of Qi
  - The Emperor's brother. The main antagonist of the series. He puts up a pretence in front of his brother, while plotting with the people of Western Xia to bring him down and usurp the throne.
- Xiao Han as Noble Consort Zhang
  - The Emperor's favoured consort.
- Zhang Yao as the Princess Dowager of Zhao
  - Zhao Yujin's mother.
- Zhang Wen as the Princess Consort of Zhao
  - Zhao Yujin's older sister-in-law
- Chou Shuokang as Little Sparrow
  - The Prince of Qi's son.

==== Western Xia ====
- Wang Ce as the King of Western Xia
- Liu Dini as Empress Yeli
- Wang Weilin as Mozang Heiyun (Black Cloud)
  - The sister in law of Empress Yeli, but later became the lover of the King.
- Zhao Lei as Crown Prince Haerdun
  - The King's son by Empress Yeli. A man who has ambitions to defeat the rival country, but is constantly overshadowed by his father and brother. He falls in love with Liu Xiyin.
- Zhang Junming as Prince Yinuo
  - The King's younger son. He is the most ambitious and powerful man in the country.
- Gao Shuang as Yeli Yuqi
  - The most powerful general in the country.

==== Others ====
- Liu Weihua as Prime Minister Lü
- Mou Fengbin as General Liu
- Liu Jinshan as Officer Liu
- Zheng Xiaodong as Hai Weining
  - A minister in charge of imperial examinations.
- Guo Yiyang as Little Guizi
  - The Empress Dowager's confidante.
- Wang Yidan as Hong Erniang
- Jin Liting as Hong Qiang
  - A prostitute who was saved by Fan Zhongyan and becomes his loyal follower.
- Wang Danni as Hong Ying
- Feng Mian as Old Madam He
- Liu Kaifei as Bai Lang
- Shao Wen as Lu Zhenting

== Soundtrack ==
No.	Title	Lyrics	Music	Singer	Length
1.	"Loyalty (忠贞)" (Ending theme song)	Cui Shu	Wang Ke	Sheng Yilun
2.	"Love is Above (爱在上)" (Theme song)	Cui Shu	Wang Ke	Cui Zige, Sheng Yilun
3.	"Spilled Water (覆水)"	Cui Shu	Li Li	Wang Churan
4.	"Blessing (恩赐)"	Cui Shu	Wang Ke	Wang Churan
5.	"I Only Believe You (我只愿相信你)"	Cui Shu	Wang Ke	Cui Zige
6.	"Pride of the Fishermen (渔家傲)"	Fan Chongyan	Yang Lin	Yang Lin

== Production ==
Notable cast members of the series include Emi Wada as the costume designer, Hidetaka Ozawa as production designer and Lu Hao Ji Ji of Go Princess Go as art director.

The series was filmed at various places such as Inner Mongolia, Gansu and Ningxia from October 2016 to April 2017.

== Awards and nominations ==
Award	Category	Nominated work	Result	Ref.
24th Huading Awards	Best Actress (Ancient Drama)	Ma Sichun	Nominated	

== Spin-off ==
Three web films were produced as a continuation of the television series, which focused on the supporting characters' side stories.

- Elysium (将军在上之极乐净土), featuring Qiu Hua.
- Lovers Across Space (将军在上之时空恋人), featuring Liu Xiyin.
- Mysterious Case of Furong (将军在上之芙蓉密案), featuring Gao Yuanjing.
