= Empress Gao =

Empress Gao may refer to:

== Empresses with the surname Gao ==
- Empress Gao (Xuanwu), empress of the Chinese/Xianbei dynasty Northern Wei
- Empress Gao (Eastern Wei), empress of the Chinese/Xianbei dynasty Eastern Wei
- Empress Gao (Xiaowu), empress of the Chinese/Xianbei dynasty Northern Wei
- Empress Gao (Former Shu), empress of the Chinese state Former Shu
- Empress Gao (Song dynasty), wife of Emperor Yingzong of Song
- Gao Guiying, empress of the Shun Dynasty of Chinese peasant rebellion leader Li Zicheng

== Empresses with the title Empress Gao ==
- Empress Lü Zhi, the wife of Emperor Gaozu of the Han Dynasty
- Empress Dowager Bo, the concubine of Emperor Gaozu, posthumously honored Empress Gao in place of Empress Lü
- Empress Ma (Hongwu), wife of the Hongwu Emperor
- Empress Xiaocigao (Qing dynasty), concubine of Nurhaci

== See also ==
- Empress Cao (disambiguation)
