= Noble Consort Zhang (Renzong) =

Empress Wencheng of Northern Song (1024–1054)

Noble Consort Zhang (張貴妃; 1024–1054), personal name unknown, posthumously Empress Wencheng (溫成皇后), was a concubine of Emperor Renzong of Song. She was the emperor's favorite despite not becoming empress (at least during her lifetime), and mother of Princess Anshou, Princess Baohe, and Princess Tangguo. She was also an important figure in the Kunning Palace Incident.

== Childhood ==
Lady Zhang, a native of Yong'an, Henan (present-day in the south of Gongyi, Henan), was the daughter of Zhang Yaofeng (張堯封) and Lady Cao (曹氏), and she had two younger sisters. Zhang Yaofeng was a scholar and died early, and Lady Cao wanted to take her daughters to Zhang Yaofeng's brother, Zhang Yaozuo (张尧佐). Zhang Yaozuo stated that the distance too long and refused. Lady Cao eventually became a performer for the then-Princess Imperial Jingguo. The Princess Imperial was the daughter of Emperor Taizong and Noble Consort Fang, and was known for her similarities to her father. She noticed that Lady Zhang was beautiful, and took her into the palace at the age of 8 along with her sisters. Lady Zhang was raised by Lady Jia (賈氏), a palace attendant.

== Imperial consort ==
云散风流岁月迁，
君恩曾不减当年。
非因掩面留遗爱，
自为难忘窈窕贤。

— Elegy by Northern Song poet Ouyang Xiu for Empress Wencheng
Translation:

The clouds disperse; grace and charm drift off as the years roll on.
Yet the sovereign’s favor has never waned from what it was.
He hides his face in grief not merely to keep alive the love she left behind;
It is that her very grace and virtue are, in truth, impossible to forget.

Lady Zhang was clever and intelligent, and renowned for her beauty. She attracted the attention of Emperor Renzong at a banquet and was favored because of her outstanding appearance, graceful bearing, and attentiveness, becoming Renzong's favorite among all the imperial consorts. After giving birth to her first daughter, Princess Anshou (安壽公主; 1040–1042), she received the rank of cairen. Princess Anshou was Renzong's favorite daughter during her short lifetime. Lady Zhang was later promoted to the rank of xiuyuan and gave birth to her second daughter Princess Baohe (寶和公主; 1042–1043), but she soon died too. Lady Zhang was then demoted to the rank of meiren. She gave birth to her third daughter Princess Tangguo (唐國公主; 1044–1045), but her last child also died in infancy.

Lady Zhang's mother, Lady Cao, was styled "Madame of Qinghe Commandery" (清河郡夫人) by Renzong. Her uncle Zhang Yaozuo was appointed as an official at the Southern Court of Xianhui. Zhang Yaozuo was constantly promoted, and went from being a 7th rank to a 6th rank official. This led to the opposition of several officials, such as Bao Zheng. That same year, Lady Zhang was elevated to guifei, one rank below the empress. She was known to love eating kumquats, and this sparked competition in the markets.

Lady Zhang died at the age of 31, around the new year. Renzong mourned her for seven days and composed poems for her. He dressed her in the robes of an empress, which caused the opposition of many officials since Empress Cao was alive. On the fourth day of the funeral, Renzong gave her the posthumous name "Empress Wencheng". Renzong bestowed the title "Madame of Qi State" (齐国夫人) upon her mother, while Zhang Yaozuo became senior advisor.

== Titles ==
- During the reign of Emperor Renzong of Song (24 March 1022 – 30 April 1063)
  - Lady Zhang (張氏)
  - Cairen (才人)
  - Xiuyuan (修媛)
  - Meiren (美人)
  - Guifei (贵妃)
  - Empress Wencheng (温成皇后)

== In popular culture ==
- Portrayed by Xiao Han in the 2017 series Oh My General
- Portrayed by Wang Churan in the 2020 series Serenade of Peaceful Joy
