= Princess Fukang =

Song dynasty princess, daughter of emperor Renzong (1038–1070)

Princess Fukang 福康公主
- Born: 1038
- Died: 1070 (aged 31–32)
- Spouse: Li Wei
Posthumous name
- Zhuangxiao (庄孝）
- Clan: House of Zhao
- Father: Emperor Renzong of Song
- Mother: Consort Miao

Princess Fukang (Chinese: 福康公主; 1038 –1070) was a princess of the Song dynasty. She was the eldest daughter of Emperor Renzong of Song.

== Background ==
Princess Fukang received her title in 1038 CE, shortly after she was born. Her mother was Lady Miao, one of Emperor Renzong's concubines. Renzong was very fond of Fukang.

In 1056, she married Li Wei, her first cousin once removed, who was of a similar age. Li Wei was the son of Renzong's uncle. The marriage happened because Renzong's mother, Consort Li, died early, and he wanted to have more connections with his mother's family, and to repay them. However, Princess Fukang did not have a happy marriage. Both Li Wei and his mother did not like her. They divorced briefly, and were forced to marry again.

According to legend, the deeply unhappy Princess Fukang confided in, and became close to, a eunuch court official named Liang Huaiji. Her husband's family was angered by this, and in response Emperor Renzong transferred Liang, appointing him as a guard of the imperial mausoleum. Distraught at being parted, Princess Fukang became mad.

Princess Fukang died in 1078, aged 33. Her posthumous name is Zhuangxiao (庄孝), which means wide and filial.

== In popular culture ==
In the television series Serenade of Peaceful Joy, Princess Fukang had the name Zhao Huirou, and was played by five actors.

Adult: Ren Min (任敏)/ Teenager: He Sitian (何思甜)/ Pre-teen: Ren Feier (任飞儿)/ Child: Zheng Yuyi (张毓宜)/ Toddler: Su Yike (苏伊可)
