= Wang Churan =

Chinese actress (born 1999)

- Wang Churan in 2026
- Born: 21 January 1999 (age 27); Shanghai, China
- Education: Shanghai Theater Academy
- Occupation: Actress
- Years active: 2017–present
- Agent: Fosun Pictures
- Height: 172 cm (5 ft 8 in)

Chinese name
- Simplified Chinese: 王楚然
Transcriptions
Standard Mandarin
- Hanyu Pinyin: Wángchǔrán

Wang Churan (Chinese: 王楚然; born 21 January 1999) is a Chinese actress, model, and singer. She made her acting debut in 2017 hit drama Oh My General and gained recognition for playing Consort Zhang Bihan in Serenade of Peaceful Joy. Wang is known for her work in historical dramas and has since appeared in various films and series.

== Career ==
In 2017, Wang rose to fame for starring in the historical comedy web series Oh My General. The show earned over 100 million clicking rates within the first day of screening. In addition to acting, Wang also sang two soundtracks, "Fushui" and "Enci", for the web series. She then starred in a spin-off of the series, titled Lovers Across Space where she played the leading role. She also sang its soundtracks.

In 2020, Wang gained further recognition from playing Consort Zhang in the historical drama Serenade of Peaceful Joy. The same year, she starred in the family drama The Last Goodbye to Mama. In 2023, Wang starred in the medical romance drama Love Heals as Ruan Liuzheng alongside Peng Guanying.

== Filmography ==
=== Television series ===
| Year | English title | Chinese title | Role | Network | Notes | Ref. |
|---|---|---|---|---|---|---|
| 2017 | Oh My General | 将军在上 | Liu Xiyin | Youku | Main Role | |
| 2017 | Oh My General: Lovers Across Space | 将军在上之时空恋人 | Liu Xiyin | Youku | Main role | |
| 2020 | Serenade of Peaceful Joy | 清平乐 | Consort Zhang | Hunan TV | Support role | |
| 2020 | Together | 在一起 | Yao Ning | Dragon TV | Support role | |
| 2020 | The Legend of Xiao Chuo | 燕云台 | Yu Xiao | Tencent Video | Support role | |
| 2021 | The Last Goodbye to Mama | 见啦！母亲大人 | Xu Ya | CCTV | Support role | |
| 2022 | Royal Feast | 尚食 | Su Yuehua | Mango TV | Main role | |
| 2022 | Challenges at Midlife | 落花时节 | Cheng Kexin | Dragon TV, Zhejiang TV | Guest role | |
| 2023 | Love Heals | 听说你喜欢我 | Ruan Liuzheng | Tencent Video | Main role | |
| 2023 | The Longest Promise | 玉骨谣 | Bai Xuelu | Tencent Video | Support role | |
| 2023 | Fireworks of My Heart | 我的人间烟火 | Xu Qin | Mango TV | Main role | |
| 2024 | Joy of Life 2 | 庆余年 第二季 | Sang Wen | CCTV, Tencent Video | Main role | |
| 2024 | Are You the One | 柳舟记 | Liu Miantang | Tencent Video | Main role | |
| 2026 | How Dare You!? | 成何体统 | Yu Wanyin / Wang Cuihua | iQIYI | Main role | |
| 2026 | Love Has Fireworks | 爱情有烟火 | Qian Fei | CCTV, Tencent Video, iQIYI | Main role | |
| 2026 | Overdo | 这一秒过火 | Ren Susu / Fang Mulan | iQIYI, Tencent Video | Main role | |
| TBA | Hidden Shadow | 烽影燃梅香 | Mei Jiu / An Jiu | Youku | Main role | |
| TBA | A Ming Dynasty Adventure | 明月录 | Wei Caiwei | Mango TV | Main role | |
| TBA | Tales of the Floating World | 浮生 | Sha Luo | iQIYI | Main role | |

=== Variety shows ===
| Year | Title | Note | Ref. |
|---|---|---|---|
| 2026 | Natural High; Season:4 Ep: | Main cast | |

== Discography ==
=== Soundtrack appearances ===
| Year | English title | Chinese title | Album | Notes |
|---|---|---|---|---|
| 2017 | "Gift" | 恩赐 | Oh My General OST | |
| 2017 | "Flood" | 覆水 | Oh My General OST | |
| 2025 | "Starlight for You" | 星河予你 | Non-album single | |
