= Empress Cao =

Empress Cao may refer to:

== China ==
These empresses had the surname Cao (曹).

- Empress Cao (Han dynasty) (died 260), empress of the Han dynasty
- Empress Cao (Dou Jiande's wife) (fl. 621)
- Empress Cao (Huang Chao's wife) (died 884)
- Empress Dowager Cao (Li Cunxu's mother) (died 925), empress dowager of Later Tang
- Empress Cao (Li Siyuan's wife) (died 937), empress of Later Tang
- Empress Cao (Song dynasty) (1016–1079), empress of the Song dynasty

== Vietnam ==
These empresses received the posthumous name Empress Cao (Cao Hoàng hậu, 高皇后; "High Empress").

- Thừa Thiên (empress) (1762–1814), first wife of Emperor Gia Long
- Thuận Thiên (Nguyễn dynasty empress) (1769–1846), second wife of Emperor Gia Long

== See also ==
- Empress Gao (disambiguation)
