= Call of Heroes =

2016 Hong Kong-Chinese film by Benny Chan

- Film poster
- Chinese: 危城
- Literal meaning: city under siege
- Hanyu Pinyin: wēichéng
- Jyutping: ngai4 sing4
- Directed by: Benny Chan
- Screenplay by: Benny Chan; Doug Wong; Tam Wai-ching; Tim Tong; Chien I-chueh
- Produced by: Benny Chan; Alvin Lam
- Starring: Sean Lau; Louis Koo; Eddie Peng; Yuan Quan; Jiang Shuying; Wu Jing
- Cinematography: Pakie Chan
- Edited by: Yau Chi-wai
- Music by: Wong Kin-wai
- Production companies: Universe Entertainment; Bona Film Group; Sun Entertainment Culture; iQiyi Motion Pictures; Guangzhou City Ying Ming Culture Communication; Long Motion Pictures; Alpha Pictures Investment (Beijing) Company; Zhile Culture Media; Beijing Jumbo Pictures Investment; Zhejiang Guanjian Films
- Distributed by: Universe Films Distribution
- Release date: 18 August 2016
- Running time: 119 minutes
- Countries: Hong Kong; China
- Languages: Cantonese; Mandarin
- Budget: US$32 million
- Box office: CN¥167.4 million (China) / (US$24.6 million)

Call of Heroes (Chinese: 危城, previously known as The Deadly Reclaim) is a 2016 action film co-written, co-produced and directed by Benny Chan, with action direction by Sammo Hung. A Hong Kong-Chinese co-production, the film stars Sean Lau, Louis Koo, Eddie Peng, Yuan Quan, Jiang Shuying, with a special appearance by Wu Jing.

Filming began in early June 2015. The film was released on 18 August 2016.

== Plot ==
China has devolved into a patchwork of competing military governates following the dissolution of the Qing Dynasty. As Marshal Cho, the son of a military governor, wanders around the area of Shitoucheng indiscriminately killing and robbing from civilians, a school-teacher named Ms Pak flees with her students, and along with other refugees are admitted into Pucheng, which belongs to another governor. Since the soldiers of Pucheng are away on a campaign, authority falls to Colonel Yeung, leader of the militia. A few days later, Cho, who derives pleasure from random killings, enters Pucheng alone and murders Pak's cousin, and one of her students. He is quickly arrested and sentenced to death, but his father's soldiers arrive and demand his release. When Yeung refuses to give in, and threatens to kill Cho on the spot, the soldiers declare that Yeung must release Cho in the morning, or else the entire town will be killed.

Two of the soldiers' commanders worry about Cho, and attempt to lead a squad in a rescue mission at night, to attack the prison and set Cho free, but the militia members successfully repel them. The richest man in town, Mr Lau, who recently hired private security guards, sends them to murder Yeung and his best friend Tither Liu, so he can take control of the town and set Cho free. While Yeung's friend is killed, Yeung manages to defeat Lau's men. When Yeung tries to arrest Lau, the entire town protests and pleads with Yeung to liberate Cho, and thereby spare the town from massacre. Yeung does not wish to comply, and resigns instead, and disbands the militia. However, in the morning, when Cho's soldiers arrive and free him, they begin plundering the entire town and killing civilians indiscriminately. Yeung, his wife, and his few remaining followers fight back by bombing the soldiers' camp, setting traps within the town, and arming the surviving townsfolk so they can retaliate. In the end, Cho is killed, and when his father leads the main army in a revenge mission against Pucheng, it happens that Pucheng's own army returns and defeats Cho's father in a pitched field battle. Cho's father later killed. Law and order is restored for a time, while the film goes on to question the privileges of the upper class and the true nature of justice even today.

== Cast ==
- Sean Lau as Yeung Hak-nan (楊克難)
- Louis Koo as Cho Siu-lun (曹少璘)
- Eddie Peng as Ma Fung (馬鋒)
- Yuan Quan as Chow So-so (周素素)
- Jiang Shuying as Pak Ling (白玲)
- Wu Jing as Cheung Yik (張亦)
- Liu Kai-chi as Tither Liu (廖甲長)
- Berg Ng as Shum Ting (沈淀)
- Sammy Hung as Cheung Mo (張武)
- Philip Keung as Lee Tit-ngau (李鐵牛)
- Xing Yu as Wong Wai-fu (王威虎)
- Sammo Hung as General on horse (uncredited cameo)

== Production ==
The project, budgeted at US$32 million, was first announced at the 2015 Hong Kong Filmart, which took place in March 2015, under the title The Deadly Reclaim, and was scheduled to start production in April and be released at the end of the year. Production began in June 2015 where on the 17th of the same month, a press conference was held on the film's outdoor set at the Keyan Scenic Area in Shaoxing, Zhejiang, China, where producer and director Benny Chan, action director Sammo Hung and cast members Sean Lau, Louis Koo, Eddie Peng, Yuan Quan, Jiang Shuying, Liu Kai-chi, Wu Jing, Philip Keung and Sammy Hung were present. The set took over four months to build. Lau, who has not filmed a martial arts film in 20 years, was trained to use a whip to prepare his role as a guardian leader of Pucheng village. Koo will portray the film's main villain, a ruthless warlord, while Peng will portray wanderer. On 19 June, the film's production company and distributor Universe Entertainment released a teaser trailer featuring behind the scenes footage and displaying a slated release date of 2016. Universe Entertainment released a second teaser trailer on 15 March 2016 under a new title, Call of Heroes.

== Reception ==
The film grossed US$13.6 million on its opening weekend in China. It grossed a total of CN¥167.4 million at the Chinese box office.

It received mixed to positive reviews from critics and Sammo Hung was nominated for Best Action Choreography at the 36th Hong Kong Film Awards.

== See also ==
- Sammo Hung filmography
