= Jiang Shuying =

Chinese actress

- Born: Shanghai, China
- Other name: Maggie Jiang
- Education: Shanghai Theatre Academy (BFA, 2008); University of East Anglia (MSc Media Economics, 2011)
- Occupation: Actress
- Years active: 2005–present
- Agent: M.young

Chinese name
- Chinese: 江疏影
Transcriptions
Standard Mandarin
- Hanyu Pinyin: Jiāng Shūyǐng

Jiang Shuying (Chinese: 江疏影; pinyin: Jiāng Shūyǐng), also known as Maggie Jiang, is a Chinese actress. She is known for her roles in television series So Young (2013), To be a Better Man (2016), and Nothing But Thirty (2020).

== Career ==
Jiang rose to fame for her role in the 2013 film So Young, which won her Asian Film Award for Best Newcomer. She then starred in the family drama A Servant of Two Masters alongside Zhang Jiayi and Yan Ni, and won the Huading Awards for Best Supporting Actress.

In 2015, she starred in medical drama Grow Up and romantic comedy series My Best Ex Boy-friend.

In 2016, she starred in the romance drama To Be a Better Man alongside Sun Honglei. The series was highly popular during its run and positive reviews. Jiang received acclaim for her performance, and won the Best Screen Performance award at the iQiyi All-Star Carnival. The same year, she won the Best Supporting Actress award at the 3rd China Australia International Film Festival for her performance in the action film Call of Heroes.

In 2018, Jiang starred in dramas Memories of Love alongside Wallace Chung and Aaron Yan, and Mr. Right with Jin Dong.

In 2019, Jiang starred in the esports drama The King's Avatar. The same year, she featured in historical fantasy drama Novoland: Eagle Flag. Jiang ranked 43rd on Forbes China Celebrity 100 list.

In 2020, Jiang starred in modern romance drama Wait in Beijing with Li Yifeng, historical drama Held in the Lonely Castle, and TV drama Nothing But Thirty.

== Filmography ==
=== Film ===
Year	English title	Chinese title	Role	Notes/Ref.
2010	Beautiful Girls Like Clouds	美女如云	Ru Yun	
2013	So Young	致我们终将逝去的青春	Ruan Guan	
2013	Color Diary	色彩日记		
2014	A Noble Spirit	天上的菊美	Ba Mo	
2014	My Geeky Nerdy Buddies	大宅男	Chen Yaling	
2015	Beijing & New York	北京，纽约	Shi Yuqin	
2015	Cities in Love	恋爱中的城市	Jiang Xiaobei	
2015	Running Lover	奔跑吧有情人	Su Min	Web film
2016	House of Wolves	恶人报喜	Yu Chun	
2016	Call of Heroes	危城	Bai Ling	
2018	Iceman: The Time Traveller	冰封侠时空行者		Special appearance

=== Television series ===
Year	English title	Chinese title	Role	Notes/Ref.
2006	The Flower Flies like the Butterfly	飞花如蝶	Jin Feng	
2014	A Servant of Two Masters	一仆二主	Gu Jingjing	
2015	Grow Up	长大	Chen Xi	
2015	My Best Ex Boy-friend	最佳前男友	Fu Fangsi	
2016	Go! Goal! Fighting!	旋风十一人	Pei Duo	
2016	To Be A Better Man	好先生	Jiang Lai	
2018	Mr. Right	恋爱先生	Luo Yue	
2018	Memories of Love	一路繁花相送	Xin Chen	
2019	Novoland: Eagle Flag	九州缥缈录	Gong Yuyi	Guest appearance
2019	The King's Avatar	全职高手	Chen Guo	
2020	Wait in Beijing	我在北京等你	Sheng Xia	
2020	Held in the Lonely Castle	清平乐	Cao Danshu	
2020	Nothing But Thirty	三十而已	Wang Manni	
2021	Crime Crackdown	扫黑风暴	Huang Xi	
2022	Ode to Joy 3	欢乐颂3	Ye Zhenzhen	
2022	Lady of Law	女士的法则	Xu Jie	

== Discography ==
Year	English title	Chinese title	Album	Notes/Ref.
2018	"The New Era of Zanzan"	赞赞新时代		Performance for CCTV New Year's Gala
2019	"We Are All Dream Chasers"	我们都是追梦人		Performance for CCTV New Year's Gala
2019	"Romance Between Mountain and Water"	山水相恋		with Zhu Yilong

== Awards and nominations ==
Year	Award	Category	Nominated work	Results	Ref.
2013	8th Chinese Young Generation Film Forum Awards	Best New Actress	So Young	Won	
2013	5th China Image Film Festival	Best Supporting Actress	So Young	Won	
2014	8th Asian Film Awards	Best Newcomer	So Young	Won	
2015	17th Huading Awards	Best Supporting Actress	A Servant of Two Masters	Won	
2015	21st Shanghai Television Festival	Best Supporting Actress	A Servant of Two Masters	Nominated	
2016	3rd China Australia International Film Festival	Best Supporting Actress	Call of Heroes	Won	
2018	12th Tencent Video Star Awards	Word-of-Mouth Television Actress	—N/a	Won	
2019	6th The Actors of China Award Ceremony	Best Actress (Web series)	The King's Avatar	Nominated	
2019	15th Chinese American Film Festival	Best Actress (Web series)	The King's Avatar	Won	
2019	3rd Yinchuan Internet Film Festival	Best Actress (Web series)	The King's Avatar	Won	
2019	Tencent Video All Star Awards	Quality Actor of the Year	The King's Avatar	Won	
2019	Golden Bud - The Fourth Network Film And Television Festival	Best Actress	Novoland: Eagle Flag, The King's Avatar	Nominated	
2020	7th The Actors of China Award Ceremony	Best Actress (Emerald)	—N/a	Won	
2022	31st China TV Golden Eagle Awards	Best Actress	Nothing But Thirty	Nominated	
