= Hu Su (Republic of China general) =

Chinese general (1899–1978)

- 胡素
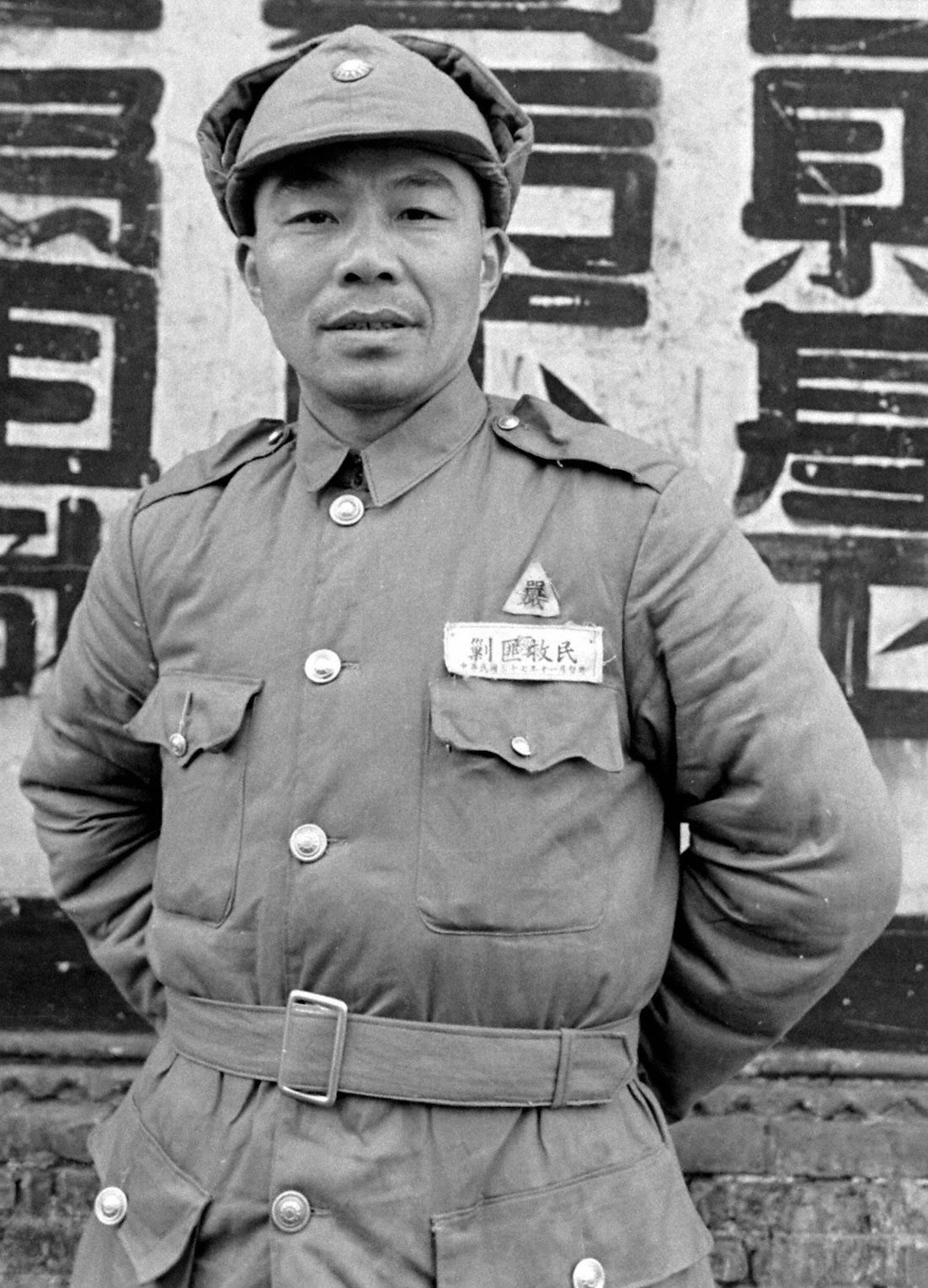
- Born: 29 December 1899; Qingjiang County, Jiangxi, Qing dynasty
- Died: 19 June 1978 (aged 78); Taipei, Taiwan
- Education: Whampoa Military Academy; Waseda University
- Military career
- Allegiance: Republic of China
- Branch: (Republic of China (1912–1949)) National Revolutionary Army
- Service years: 1924–1960
- Rank: Lieutenant General
- Conflicts: Northern Expedition; Second Sino-Japanese War; Burma campaign; Siege of Myitkyina; Chinese Civil War

Hu Su (Chinese: 胡素; pinyin: Hú Sù; Wade–Giles: Hu Su; 29 December 1899 – 19 June 1978) was a Chinese lieutenant general in the Republic of China Army from Qingjiang County, Jiangxi.

== Biography ==
Hu Su came from a wealthy peasant family, where his father was a merchant and farmer. In 1924, he enrolled in the first class of the Whampoa Military Academy. After graduation, he served as a junior officer in the First Training Regiment. During the Northern Expedition, he was promoted to battalion commander and then regimental attaché for his military achievements. In 1927, he went to Japan to study political economy at Waseda University. In 1935, he enrolled in the 13th class of the Army University. After the outbreak of the Second Sino-Japanese War, Hu Su served as Chief of the Infantry Department and then deputy director of the Education Department of the Central Military Academy. He was promoted to Major General on 2 June 1938. In 1943, he was appointed commander of the New 30th Division of the Chinese Expeditionary Force. In 1944, he was promoted to lieutenant general and made deputy commander of the New 1st Army and participated in the Siege of Myitkyina. After the war, Hu Su was transferred to command the 205th Division of the Youth Army and then deputy commander of the 9th Army of the Youth Army. In 1948, he was elected to the National Congress and served as deputy commander of the Jiangxi Provincial Security Bureau and commander of the Nanchang Garrison. In 1949, Hu Su became deputy commander of the 12th Corps. He later retreated to Taiwan and retired from military service in 1960. In his later years, he devoted himself to Buddhist studies. Hu Su served as chairman of the Taipei Lotus Friends Chanting Buddhist Association.

Hu Su died in Taipei on 19 June 1978. His posthumous works include the "Memorial Collection of Mr. Hu Su."
