= Dongpo =

Dongpo may refer to:

- Dongpo Academy (東坡書院), former academy located in Hainan, built in 1098 in memory of Su Dongpo
- Dongpo pork, Hangzhou dish made by pan-frying and then red cooking pork belly
- Su Dongpo (苏东坡; 1037–1101), Chinese writer, poet, artist, calligrapher, pharmacologist, and statesman of the Song dynasty
- Dongpo District (东坡区), Meishan, Sichuan
- Dongpo, Jiangxi (东陂镇), town in Yihuang County
