= Sima Guang =

Song dynasty scholar (1019–1086)

Sima Guang 司馬光
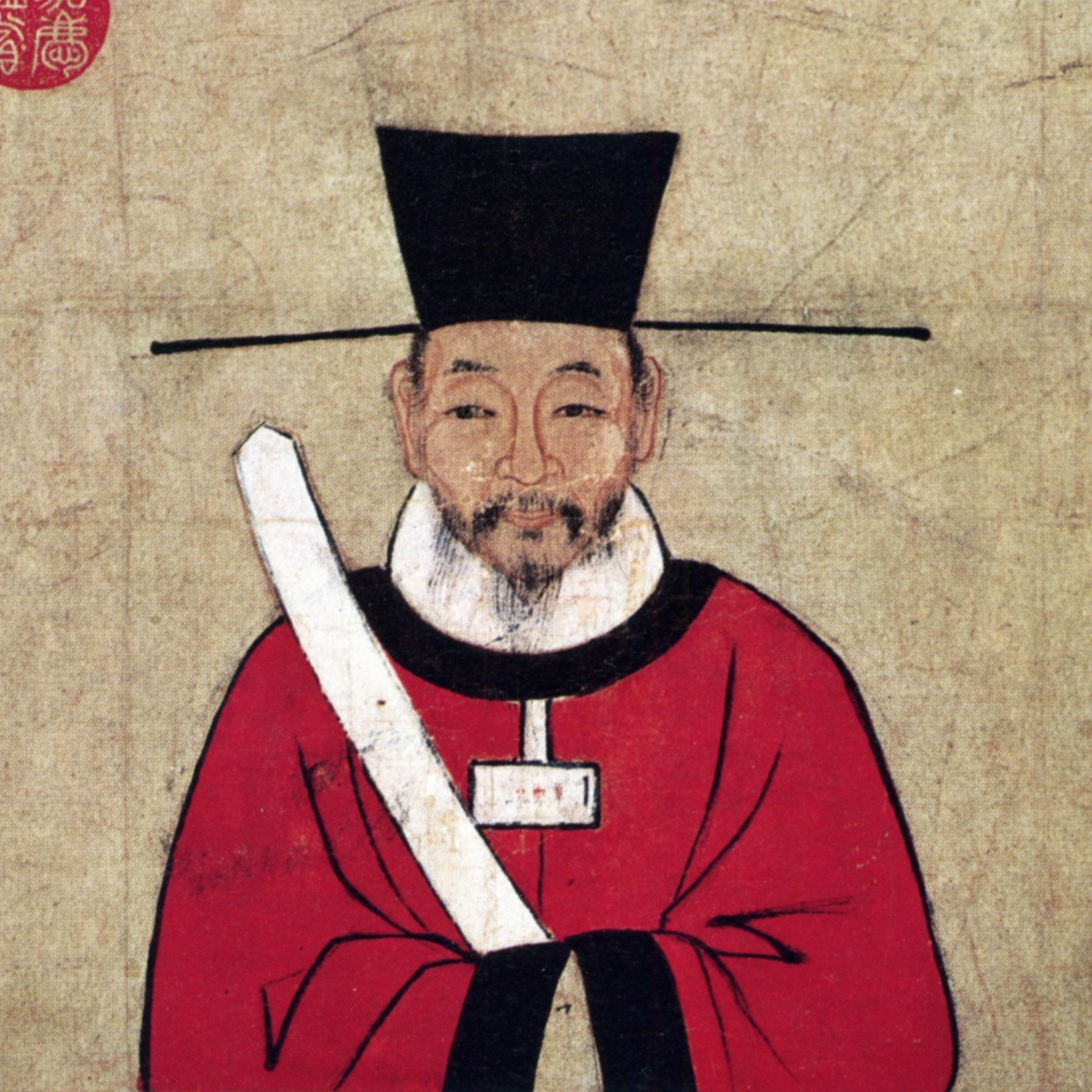

Personal details
- Born: 17 November 1019 Guangshan County, Guāng Prefecture, Song dynasty
- Died: October 11, 1086 (aged 66) Kaifeng, Song Empire
- Spouse: Lady Zhang
- Children: Sima Kang
- Parent: Sima Chi (father)
- Occupation: Historian, politician, writer
- Courtesy name: Junshi (君實)
- Art name: Yusou (迂叟)
- Posthumous name: Wenzheng (文正)
- Other names: Sushui Xiansheng (涑水先生)

Sima Guang
- Traditional Chinese: 司馬光
- Simplified Chinese: 司马光
Transcriptions
Standard Mandarin
- Hanyu Pinyin: Sīmǎ Guāng
- Wade–Giles: Ssŭ^{1}-ma^{3} Kuang^{1}
- IPA: [sɹ̩́.mà kwáŋ]
Yue: Cantonese
- Yale Romanization: Sī-máh Gwōng
- IPA: [si˥ma˩˧ kʷɔŋ˥]

Sima Guang (Chinese: 司馬光; pinyin: Sīmǎ Guāng; 17 November 1019 – 11 October 1086), courtesy name Junshi (Chinese: 君實; pinyin: Jūnshí), hao Yusou (Chinese: 迂叟; pinyin: Yūsŏu), was a Chinese historian, politician, and writer. He was a high-ranking Song dynasty scholar-official who authored the Zizhi Tongjian, a monumental work of history.

Born into a family of officials, Sima Guang displayed remarkable intelligence from a young age and quickly rose through the ranks of the Song bureaucracy. His early career was marked by his work in government administration, where he gained a reputation for his meticulous scholarship and principled stance on state affairs. As a prominent official, he strongly opposed Wang Anshi's New Policies, arguing that they disrupted social stability and traditional governance. His criticisms led to his removal from political office when reformists held power.

After retiring from active politics, Sima devoted himself to historical research and writing. He spent years compiling and editing the Zizhi Tongjian, which he presented to Emperor Shenzong in 1084. In addition to his historical work, he advocated for the repeal of certain feudal institutions, promoting policies he believed would restore order and moral integrity to the empire. His legacy as a historian and political thinker had a lasting impact on Chinese historiography and conservative political thought.

== Early life and career ==
Sima Guang was named after Guang Prefecture, his birthplace, and where his father Sima Chi (司馬池) served as a county magistrate. The Sima family were originally from Xia County in Shǎn Prefecture, and claimed descent from the 3rd century Cao Wei official Sima Fu. A famous anecdote relates the young Sima Guang saving a playmate who had fallen into an enormous vat full of water. As other children scattered in panic, Sima calmly picked up a rock and smashed a hole in the base of the pot. Water leaked out, and his friend was saved.

At the age of 6, Sima heard a lecture concerning the Zuo Zhuan, a work of history dating to the 4th century BC. Fascinated, he was able to retell the stories to his family when he returned home. He became an avid reader, "to the point of not recognizing hunger, thirst, coldness or heat".

Sima obtained early success as a scholar and officer. When he was barely twenty, he passed the Imperial examination with the highest rank of jìnshì (進士; 'metropolitan graduate'), and spent the next several years in official positions.

=== Political ideology ===
Sima believed that civilization was created when the sage kings transformed humans from their original animal state using hierarchical order, property rights, moral instruction, and penal law. He believed that the problem with government was not in its structure, but rather in the people that ran it. He wrote multiple memorials detailing how to make the government more effective and argued that his views were in accord with history (in contrast with Wang Anshi's emphasis on the Classics) and Heaven-and-Earth. A static and well-maintained country would, according to him, last forever. Accordingly, he disliked commercial growth (which he believed encouraged social change) and preferred a recommendation-based imperial examination system.

Rulers were supposed to only determine official assignments, reward achievement, punish failure, care about their servants, have good morals, and be immune to outside influence. On a wider level, a society with clear inferior-superior roles would be stable. His deeply anti-change perspective made him a political conservative (in contrast with Wang Anshi's reformism). For Sima, to be ethical was to accept one's social status, and personal cultivation meant exercising restraint; indeed Sima interpreted the "investigation of things", a fundamental tenet of the Cheng-Zhu school of Neo-confucianism, as "restraining things". He also agreed with Xunzi's postulation that humans were inherently evil and wrote a work called "Doubting Mencius" that criticized Mencius' encouraging of the overthrow of hierarchy.

== Under Emperor Renzong ==
After the failure of the Qingli Reforms under an unenthusiastic Emperor Renzong, the future reformist Wang Anshi submitted a 10,000-word memorial in 1058 detailing a system of comprehensive reform. Sima Guang did the same thing in 1061, but his proposals were more conservative.

== Under Emperor Yingzong ==
In 1064, Sima, then just a policy critic, raised the issue between performing rituals for Zhao Yurang, Emperor Yingzong's biological father, and Emperor Renzong. This issue would dominate Yingzong's reign and cause political gridlock. Sima himself believed that priority should be given to Renzong since he was the emperor's ritual father. Yingzong overruled this belief and, partly due to personal affection for his biological father, gave Zhao Yurang high ritual honors in 1066. In the same year, Sima sponsored Su Zhe for a special decree examination.

== Under Emperor Shenzong ==
Emperor Shenzong promoted Sima to chief censor in late 1067. He opposed Shenzong's irridentism and favored a defensive stance towards the Uyghurs, Tibetans, Western Xia, and Liao dynasty. Sima hoped that the "barbarians" would commend the Song dynasty's good government. Since the end of the Qingli Reforms in 1045 did not end the Song dynasty's problems, factions developed around how to solve these issues. Conservatives like Sima Guang advocated for a smaller government budget and gradual reform. As such, Sima opposed the New Policies of Wang Anshi, which increased government authority and spending. Sima argued that more state revenue would mean less money for farmers and that the government was immoral for competing with merchants. Somewhat counterintuitively, he emphasized the unifying role of the emperor more than the reformists; he wanted the emperor to manage the bureaucracy and control officials with rewards and punishments, while the reformists wanted to implement new policies for new problems. In response to Emperor Shenzong of Song appointing him as head of the new Office of Expenditure Reduction, Sima released a scathing report that criticized the oversized bureaucracy, imperial extravagance, and an inefficient army and which called for imperial discussion rather than offering specific solutions. Shenzong quickly dissolved the office but continued to accept Sima's counsel.

By 1070, Sima was part of the Hanlin Academy, the Bureau of Military Affairs, and the Council of State. Frustrated with Wang Anshi's dominance over court and despite Shenzong's urging for him to stay, Sima retired to Luoyang in 1071, which would become the center of the conservative opposition. This made Wang largely unopposed in government. Sima was disturbed by the New Policy's control over the dynasty's people and resources.

Sima had multiple objections to the New Policies. He believed that:

1. The economy was a zero-sum game, so any increase in state revenue naturally meant taking away from the commoners.
2. Wealth gaps were beneficial to both the rich and the poor due to the stability that such inequalities provided.
3. The economy functioned best with minimal governmental intervention.
4. Money was not distributed evenly across the empire, so peasants would struggle to pay cash fees for the New Policies.

=== Retirement ===
Sima retired in Luoyang from 1071 to 1085. While there, he wrote the Zizhi Tongjian and cultivated friendships with Shao Yong, Cheng Yi, and Cheng Hao. Massive famines and droughts fueled resentment towards Wang Anshi and garnered support for Sima, contributing to the conservative restoration of 1085. However, Sima was not restored to power following the unpopular Wang's retirement in 1076 since Shenzong took personal control over the New Policies. Cai Que, a semi-reformist leader, blocked Sima's re-appointment to power despite the failure of the war against the Western Xia. Cai nonetheless ingratiated him to the influential Sima by appointing Sima's disciple, Xing Shu, as a scholar.

== Under Emperor Zhezong ==
For 40 years following the death of Shenzong, the reformist and conservative factions alternated control over the Song government. Both factions engaged in "ethical factionalism" as they engaged in ruthless purges against each other. An attempted coup by the reformist faction (including Cai Que, Zhang Dun, Xing Shu, and Cai Jing) intended to dethrone Emperor Zhezong failed and aggravated the conservative faction. Sima was an old and tired man in Luoyang and was reluctant to return to the capital, but Cheng Hao convinced him to do so. When Sima arrived in Kaifeng, a large crowd swarmed to touch his horse, and palace guardsmen saluted him as "Prime Minister Sima". He encouraged people to openly express their grievances about the New Policies.

Sima was soon made chief councilor by Empress Dowager Gao, the regent for Emperor Zhezong and herself a staunch conservative. He and other recalled conservatives like Su Shi, Su Che, Cheng Yi, Cheng Hao, Wang Yansou, Fan Chunren, Wen Yanbo, and Lü Gongzhu formed the Yuanyou faction, named after the current era. Sima made ad hominem denunciations against Wang Anshi, saying: "[Wang] was self-satisfied and self-righteous, and considered himself to be unparalleled by figures past and present." Sima also blamed the Song dynasty's defeat at Yongle City during the war with the Western Xia on poor, glory-oriented leadership, while presenting himself as the "savior of the dynasty". As the conservative leader, he headed his coalition to demote reformist leaders to lowly prefectural-level posts (while promoting conservatives into high positions and, one by one, abolished many of the New Policies. He also wanted to combine the Secretariat and the Chancellery, arguing that the latter was redundant: "[The Chancellery] serves no purpose except to double the number of clerks and multiply paperwork." The two departments would be combined in 1129. Cai Que and Zhang Dun would lead the reformist opposition against the conservative restoration.

=== Abolishing the Baojia system ===
The compulsory Baojia village defense system trained and enrolled nearly 7 million men across the dynasty. Sima criticized the system's detracting from agricultural productivity and its potential for creating bandits. Wang Yansou criticized the unnecessary brutality of the system. In mid-1085, an imperial edict abolished the system in the capital and its surrounding areas, with more restrictions imposed on this system in the following months. Reformist opposition to the system's abolition was weak and primarily logistical rather than ideological. Zhang Dun's call for moderate abolition was reasonable considering the shock that followed the rapid abolishment of the Baojia system.

=== Abolishing the equal tax law and market exchange law ===
The equal tax law was a system of land evaluation and taxation that was probably the most successful of the New Policies. The law was removed with little opposition in late 1085.

The market exchange law established government monopolies that were intended to buy cheap products and sell dear products. However, the established agencies cornered the market in staple goods and became focused on generating revenue. Throughout 1085, executive orders forgave debt owed to the agencies and abolished loan bureaus before abolishing the law altogether. This signaled the turning point for the reformist-conservative conflict.

=== Abolishing the labor recruitment law and the fall of Cai Que and Zhang Dun ===
The labor recruitment law replaced corvée labor with professional laborers funded by service exemption fees paid by the richest rural households. Similar to the market exchange law, this law primarily became a method for revenue extraction. Sima argued that the law was simply another tax imposed on the commoners. Cai Que's refusal to remove the labor recruitment law led to his character assassination by the conservatives Liu Chi and Su Che; this pushed him to resign as chancellor of the right and he was reappointed as the administrator of Chenzhou. Zhang Dun continued to resist and pointed out Sima's hypocrisy regarding the law: in early 1086, Sima said that rich households were harmed by the law, while just 14 days later he said that rich households benefitted from their preferential treatment under the law. Zhang also criticized Sima's demand to abolish the law country-wide in a mere 5 days. Indeed, Sima was impressed when Cai Jing, the mayor of Kaifeng, was the only one who abolished the law in under 5 days. 21 days after Cai Que resigned, Zhang Dun was demoted to a prefectural-level post after offending Empress Gao during a debate. In spring 1086, Wang Anshi died. The conservative restoration was complete.

Nonetheless, the debate over how to remove the labor recruitment law revealed cracks in the conservative coalition. For example, Su Che (and many other conservatives who were typically closely aligned with Sima) argued that "an entire system could not be abolished overnight without serious repercussions" and that a framework for the replacement system should be formulated first. Su Shi, Su Che's older brother, formed a third faction and proposed that the funds from the labor recruitment law should be used to buy up public lands to grant to volunteer laborers in addition to their wages. Sima did not accept dissent from either group.

=== Abolishing the green sprouts law and peace with the Western Xia ===
The green sprouts law was intended to give low-interest loans to farmers but, like many of the aforementioned policies, became a method of revenue extraction. Conservative opposition to this policy was unified and Fan Chunren, the son of Fan Zhongyan, was the only dissenter. His argument that the law could boost the dynasty's base revenue annoyed Sima Guang and he was only saved by Wang Yansou's intervention. This incident revealed the deepening divisions within Sima's coalition that would exacerbate after his death.

Following the protracted, expensive, and ultimately disappointing war against the Western Xia, the conservatives wanted to appease the Western Xia for peace. The concession of Lanzhou to the Xia was highly controversial and, along with 4 fortresses that were ostensibly ceded to Xia, remained a source of border tension for the following decades. The official truce was signed in 1089 and was broken by a 1096 invasion by the restored Zhang Dun.

== Historical work ==
Sima Guang is best remembered for his masterwork, Zizhi Tongjian, and the Australian sinologist Rafe de Crespigny describes him as "perhaps the greatest of all Chinese historians" (de Crespigny 1973:65).

In 1064, Sima presented to Emperor Yingzong of Song the five-volume Liniantu ("Chart of Successive Years"). It chronologically summarized events in Chinese history from 403 BCE to 959 CE and served as a prospectus for sponsorship of his ambitious project in historiography. These dates were chosen because 403 BCE was the beginning of the Warring States period, when the ancient State of Jin was subdivided, which eventually led to the establishment of the Qin dynasty—959 CE was the end of the Five Dynasties and Ten Kingdoms period and the beginning of the Song dynasty.

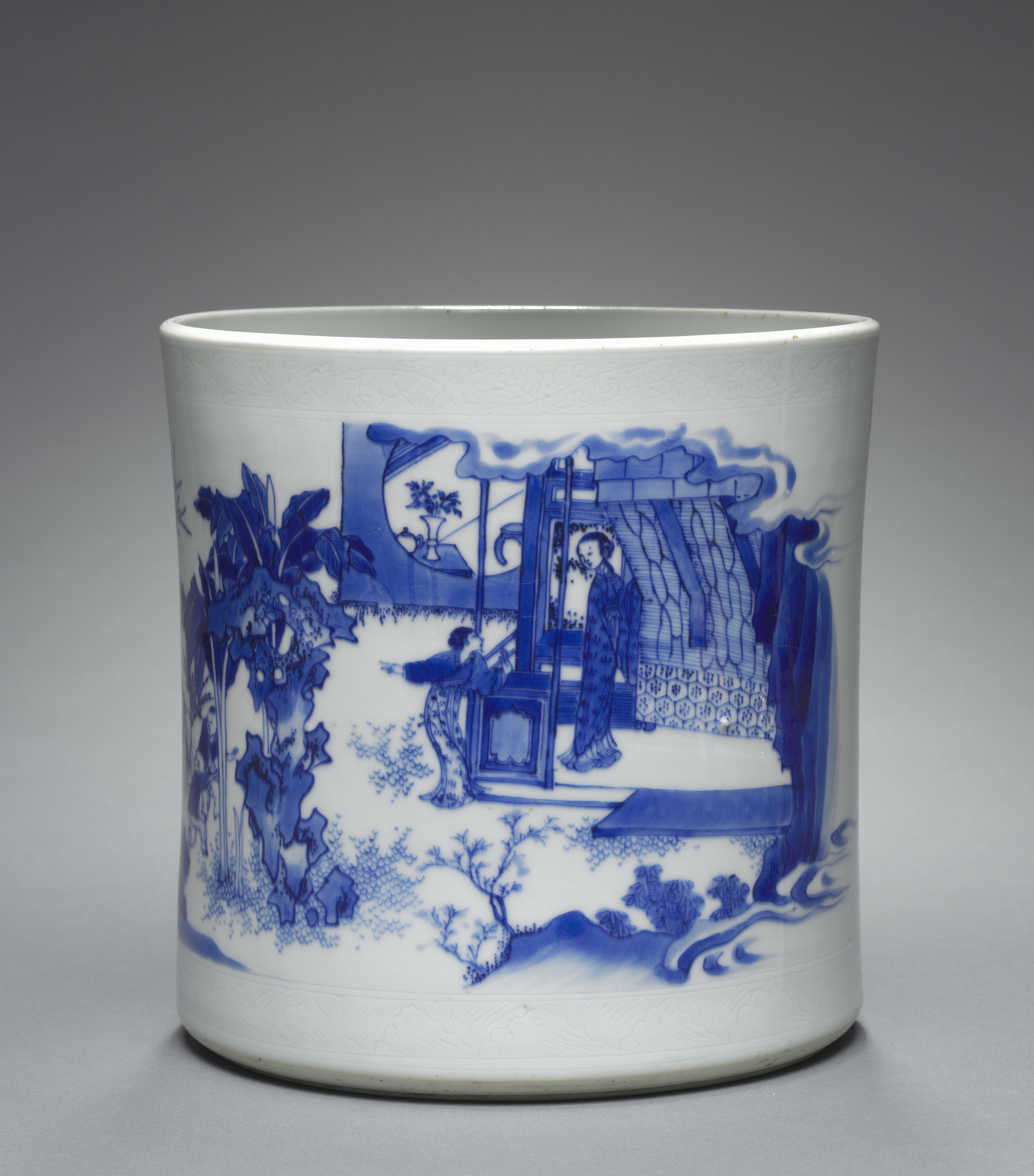
Brush pot with the pot-breaking episode from the story of Sima Guang, transitional porcelain

In 1066, he presented a more detailed eight-volume Tongzhi (通志; 'Comprehensive Records'), which chronicled Chinese history from 403 BCE to 207 BCE (the end of the Qin dynasty). The emperor issued an edict for the compilation of a groundbreaking universal history of China, granting full access to imperial libraries, and allocating funds for the costs of compilation, including research assistance by experienced historians such as Liu Ban (劉攽, 1022–88), Liu Shu (劉恕, 1032–78), and Fan Zuyu (范祖禹, 1041–98). After Yingzong died in 1067, Sima was invited to the palace to introduce his work-in-progress to Emperor Shenzong of Song. The new emperor not only confirmed the interest his father had shown, but showed his favor by bestowing an imperial preface in which he changed the title from Tongzhi ("Comprehensive Records") to Zizhi Tongjian ("Comprehensive Mirror to Aid in Government"). Scholars interpret the "Mirror" of the title to denote a work of reference and guidance, indicating that Shenzong accepted Sima as his guide in the study of history and its application to government. The emperor maintained his support for the compilation of this comprehensive history until its completion in 1084.

From the late 1060s, Sima came to assume a role as leader of what has been identified as a conservative faction at court, resolutely opposed to the New Policies of Chancellor Wang Anshi. Sima presented increasingly critical memorials to the throne until 1070, when he refused further appointment and withdrew from court. In 1071, he took up residence in Luoyang, where he remained with an official sinecure, providing sufficient time and resources to continue the compilation of Zizhi Tongjian. Though the historian and the emperor continued to disagree on policies, Sima's enforced retirement proved essential for him to complete his chronological history over the following one and a half decades. Contemporary accounts relate that, in order to work more and sleep less when he was writing his great opus, the Zizhi Tongjian, he had a wooden pillow made from a log that was designed to slip from under his head whenever he rolled over. He called this Jingzhen 警枕 (Alert Pillow), and used it throughout the period of Zizhi Tongjian's compilation.

=== Historiography ===
Sima rejected the roles of the dynastic cycle and Five Phases in legitimizing dynastic succession. For Sima, dynastic succession was instead a result of power struggles; dynasties rose and fell according to consistent factors. He believed that history was a "mirror" for the present and could provide the government with historical context for their current situation. Literati could thus use history as an aid to governance. His histories are structured in a way that promotes these theories.

Sima and the other Yuanyou faction conservatives (except for Su Shi, who had an unorthodox interpretation of the Tao) would be positively associated with Neo-confucianism. Liu Anshi, an important Neoconfucian, was Sima's disciple.

== Death ==
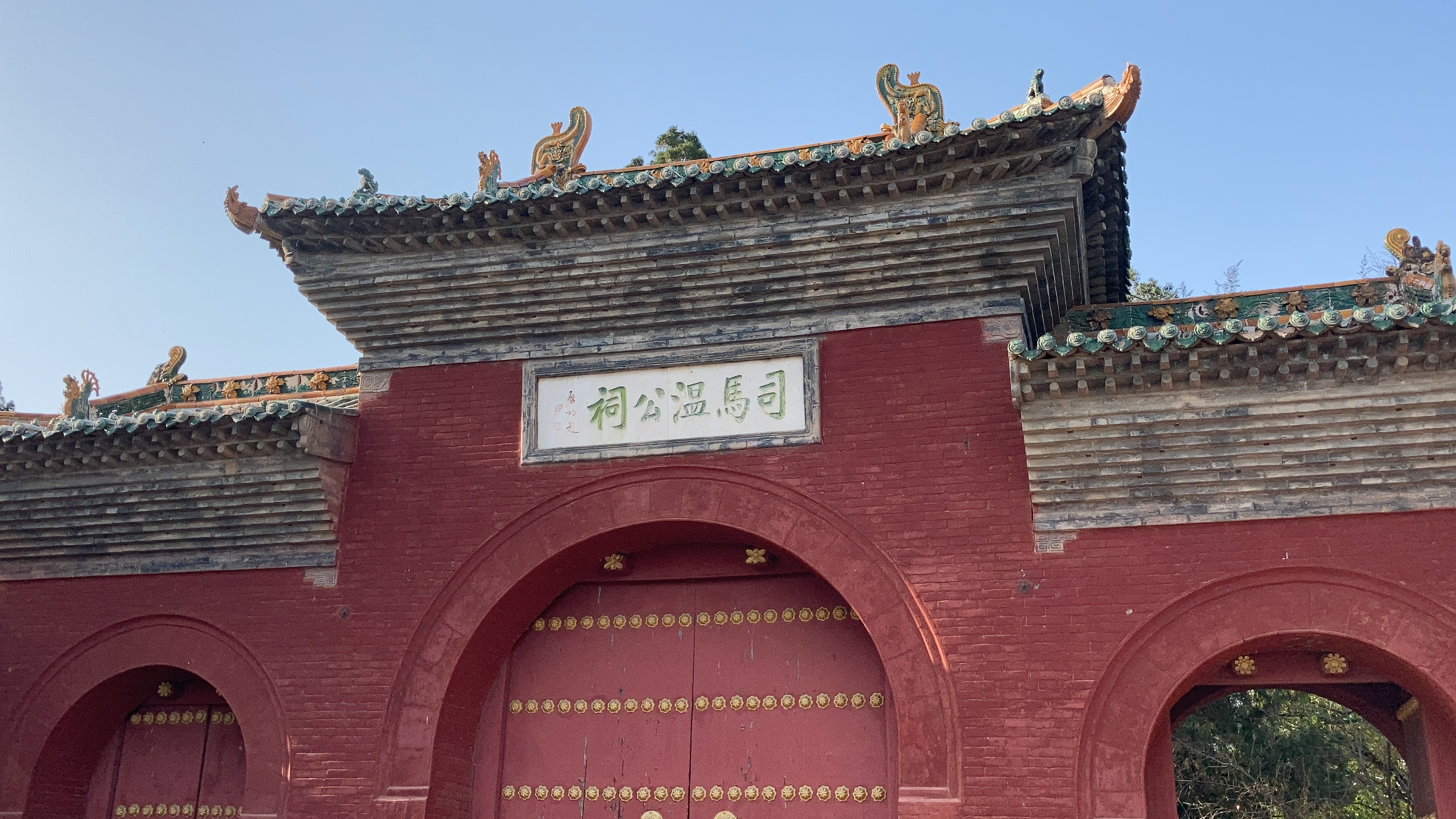
Sima Wengong Temple in Xia County, Shanxi, is the Sima family graveyard and shrine, and Sima Guang's resting place.

Emperor Shenzong died in 1085, shortly after Sima had submitted Zizhi Tongjian to the throne. Sima was recalled to court and appointed to lead the government under Emperor Zhezong of Song. He used this time in power to repeal many of the New Policies, but he died the following year, in 1086. His death fractured the conservative coalition, which split into the Shuo (Hebei) faction, the Luo (Henan) faction, and the Shu (Sichuan) faction. This ushered in a period of political gridlock from 1086 to 1093.

== Achievements ==
As well as his achievements as a statesman and historian, Sima Guang was also a lexicographer (who perhaps edited the Jiyun), and spent decades compiling his 1066 Leipian ("Classified Chapters", cf. the Yupian) dictionary. It was based on the Shuowen Jiezi, and included 31,319 Chinese characters, many of which were coined in the Song and Tang dynasty. His Family Precepts of Sima Guang (司馬溫公家訓) is also widely known and studied in China and Japan.

== See also ==
- Zizhi Tongjian
- Sushui Jiwen
- Twenty-Four Histories
- Chancellor of China
- History of the Song dynasty
- Fan Zhongyan
- Wang Anshi

== Sources ==
- de Crespigny, Rafe (1973). "Universal Histories". In Donald D. Leslie; Colin Mackerras; Wang Gungwu (eds.). Essays on the Sources for Chinese History. Columbia: University of South Carolina Press. pp. 64–70.
- Pulleyblank, Edwin G. (1961). "Chinese Historical Criticism: Liu Chih-chi and Ssu-ma Kuang," in Historians of China and Japan, William G. Beasley and Edwin G. Pulleyblank, eds., Oxford: Oxford University Press, pp. 135–66.
- Strange, Mark (2014), "Sima Guang", in Berkshire Dictionary of Chinese Biography, Kerry Brown, ed., Great Barrington, MA: Berkshire Publishing, vol. 2, pp. 664–683. ISBN 9781614729006
- Ji, Xiaobin (2005), Politics and Conservatism in Northern Song China: The Career and Thought of Sima Guang (1019–1086), Hong Kong: Chinese University Press. ISBN 962-996-183-0
- Yap, Joseph P. (2009), Wars With the Xiongnu – A translation From Zizhi tongjian, Extract translations on Qin, Han, Xin and Xiongnu and Introduction. AuthorHouse. ISBN 978-1-4490-0604-4
- (in Chinese) Toqto'a; et al., eds. (1345). Song Shi (宋史) [History of Song].
- Tanner, Harold (2010). China: A History (Volume 1): From Neolithic Cultures through the Great Qing Empire, (10,000 BCE - 1799 CE). Hackett Publishing Company, Inc. ISBN 978-1603842020.
- Twitchett, Denis; Smith, Paul Jakov (2009). The Cambridge History of China Volume 5 Part One: The Sung Dynasty and its Precursors, 907-1279. Cambridge University Press. ISBN 978-0-521-24330-8.
- Chaffee, John; Twitchett, Denis (2015). The Cambridge History of China Volume 5 Part Two: Sung China, 960–1279. Cambridge University Press. ISBN 978-0-521-81248-1.
- Ebrey, Patricia Buckley; Bickford, Maggie (2006). Emperor Huizong and Late Northern Song China. Harvard University Asia Center. ISBN 0674021274.
