= Empress Guo (Renzong) =

Empress Guo (1012 – 10 December 1035) was a Chinese empress consort of the Song Dynasty, married to Emperor Renzong of Song.

Guo was from Yingxiang and the granddaughter of the regional commandant Guo Chong. She was chosen for the position as Empress consort for the child Emperor Renzong by the Regent Dowager Empress Liu on 24 December 1024. Guo was ignored by Renzong, who preferred the palace woman Zhang.

In April 1033, her protector Empress Dowager Liu died, and Emperor Renzong was free to govern. Furious at the late Empress Dowager Liu for having passed herself off as his mother, he turned against her former allies, who now formed around Empress Guo. Empress Guo managed to have Grand Chancellor Lü Yijian exiled, but within a year, he returned and encouraged the emperor to divorce her. The cause of divorce was an argument between Empress Guo and two other women, Consort Yang and Consort Shang. The women provoked Guo until she reached out to slap them: when she did, however, they moved, which caused her slap to land upon the emperor. He then deposed her on the grounds of violence. The deposition of Empress Guo caused a conflict between the emperor and his ministers, who warned him that his divorce was unfilial and that it would undermine the position of an Empress and set an unacceptable precedent if in future an Emperor could depose an Empress, the mother of the people, merely for personal reasons.

In 1034, the emperor sent Consort Shang to a nunnery, while Consort Yang was moved to another residence. Empress Guo died a mysterious death in December 1035. Two months later, on 12 February 1036, Emperor Renzong restored Guo to the rank of Empress and she was buried on 17 February.

Chinese royalty
Preceded by Empress Liu	Empress of China; 24 December 1024 - 6 January 1034	Succeeded by Empress Cao
