= Empress Gao (Song dynasty) =

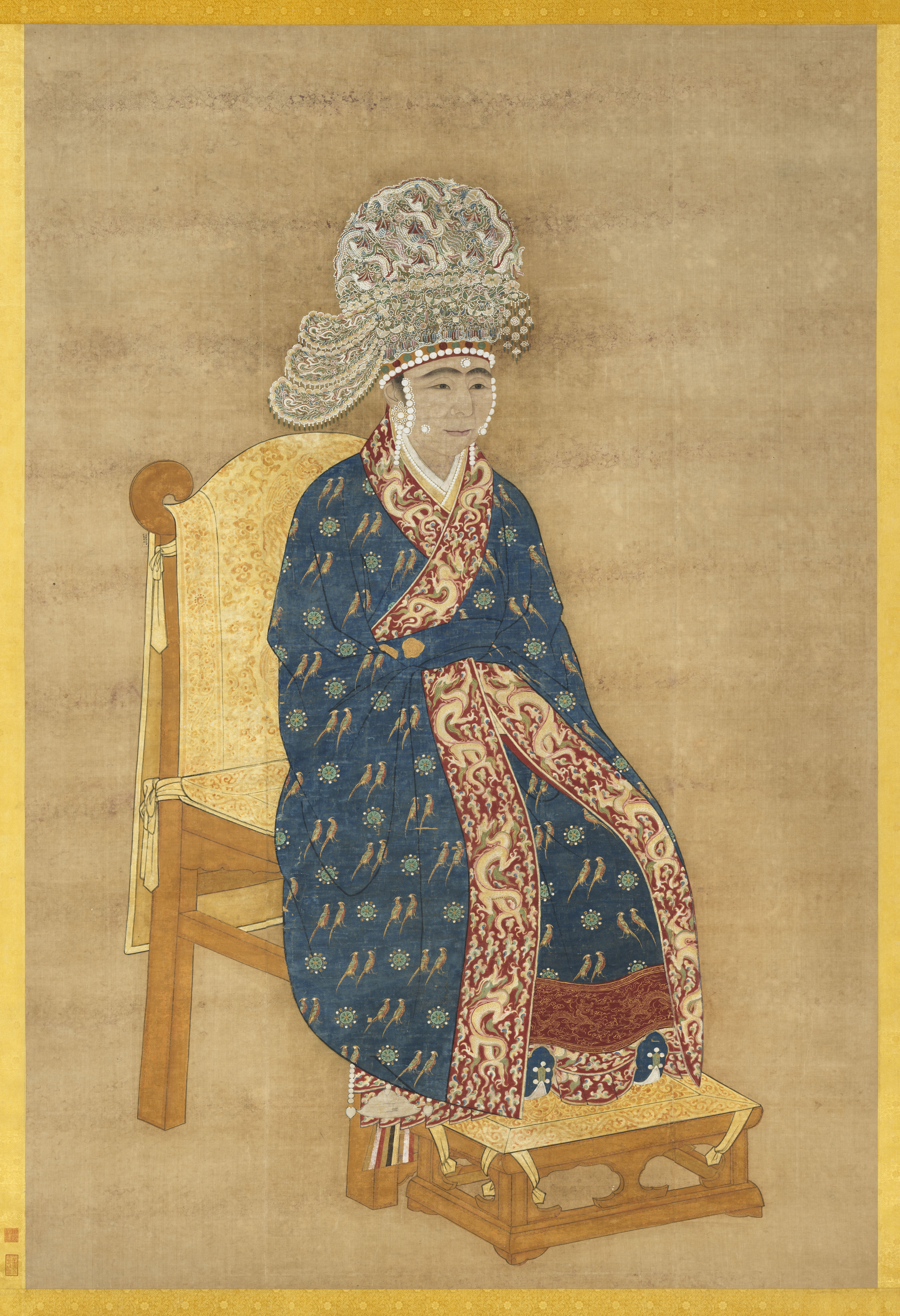

Regent of the Song dynasty
- Tenure: 18 April 1085 - 26 September 1093

Grand empress dowager of the Song dynasty
- Tenure: 1 April 1085 - 26 September 1093
- Predecessor: Grand Empress Dowager Cao
- Successor: Grand Empress Dowager Meng

Empress dowager of the Song dynasty
- Tenure: 25 January 1067 - 1 April 1085

Empress consort of the Song dynasty
- Tenure: 1065 - 25 January 1067
- Predecessor: Empress Cao
- Successor: Empress Xiang
- Born: 24 August 1032
- Died: 26 September 1093 (aged 61)
- Spouse: Emperor Yingzong of Song (m. 1047)
- Issue: Emperor Shenzong of Song; Zhao Hao, Prince Wurong; Zhao Yan, Prince Run; Zhao Yun, Prince Yiduanxian; Princess Hehui; Princess Xianhui; Princess Xiande; Princess De’an
- Father: Gao Chunxian, Prince Chun
- Mother: Lady Cao

Empress Gao (24 August 1032 - 26 September 1093) was a Chinese empress of the Song dynasty, married to Emperor Yingzong. She served as the regent of China during the minority of her grandson, Emperor Zhezong, from 1085 until her death in 1093.

== Life ==
Gao was from Mencheng in Hao Province. She was the niece of her predecessor, her maternal aunt Empress Cao, who was the empress of Emperor Renzong of Song. She was chosen as the principal consort of the heir apparent by her aunt, Empress Cao. She had four sons and four daughters.

In 1063, Emperor Yingzong succeeded Emperor Renzong, and Gao became Empress. In 1067, her spouse was succeeded by her son, Emperor Shenzong of Song, and she was named Empress Dowager. Her tenure as empress consort and empress dowager was undistinguished, and she had no power or influence during the reign of her spouse or son. During her son Shenzong's reign, she opposed the reform policy of Wang Anshi and supported Sima Guang.

=== Regency ===
Upon the death of her son Shenzong in 1085, her underage grandson became Emperor Zhezong of Song. She was elevated to Grand Empress Dowager and became regent of China during the minority of her grandson.

As Regent, Gao appointed conservatives such as Sima Guang as chancellor, who discontinued the New Policies initiated by Wang Anshi. As regent, she held court behind a lowered screen alongside the child emperor and used the same ceremonial prerogatives of a ruling emperor: her birthdays were celebrated with special names and diplomatic envoys were sent in her name rather than the emperor's. She was known to be strict toward her own relatives and refused to promote them to official posts during her reign. She has been traditionally recommended for her intelligence and good judgement in choosing officials, and her refusal to admit any influence to her relatives. Her government has been praised for restoring stability and keeping peace to the realm, but also criticized for being a period of reactionary passivity. In 1092, she selected Empress Meng to be the empress of her grandson. Gao was unwilling to retire when the emperor reached the age of seventeen, traditionally the age of majority. Her grandson the emperor favored the reformists of his father and resented both the conservatism and domineering ways of his grandmother.

Gao kept her position of regent until her death. On her deathbed, she advised her officials to retire.

== Notes ==
Chinese royalty
Preceded by Empress Cao	Empress of China; 1065 - 25 January 1067	Succeeded by Empress Xiang
