= Wen Yanbo (Song dynasty) =

Song dynasty politician

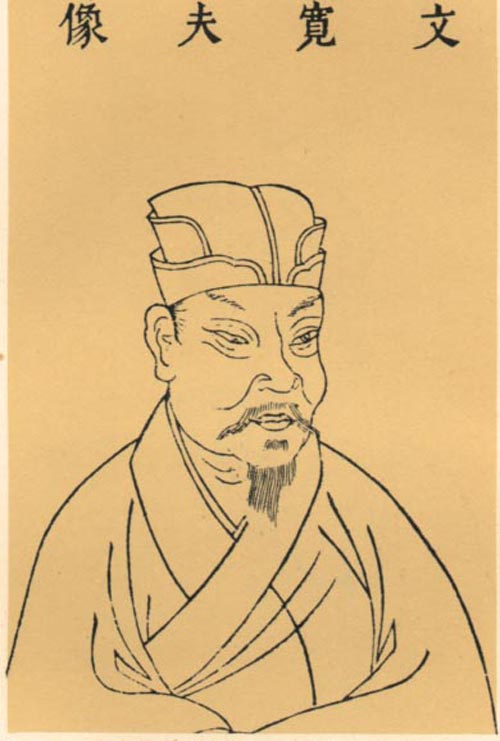
- Portrait of Wen Yanbo in the Sancai Tuhui

Personal details
- Born: October 23, 1006 Jiexiu, Fen Prefecture, Song Empire
- Died: June 16, 1097 (aged 90) Kaifeng?, Song dynasty
- Children: Sons: Wen Gongzu (文恭祖); Wen Yiqing (文貽慶); Wen Qixian (文齊賢); Wen Baoyong (文保雍); Wen Juzhong (文居中); Wen Jifu (文及甫); Wen Weishen (文維申); Wen Zongdao (文宗道); At least 3 daughters
- Parent: Wen Ji (文洎) (father)

Chinese name
- Traditional Chinese: 文彥博
- Simplified Chinese: 文彦博
Transcriptions
Standard Mandarin
- Hanyu Pinyin: Wén Yànbó

Wen Kuanfu
- Traditional Chinese: 文寬夫
- Simplified Chinese: 文宽夫
Transcriptions
Standard Mandarin
- Hanyu Pinyin: Wén Kuānfū

Wen Yanbo (23 October 1006 – 16 June 1097), courtesy name Kuanfu, was a scholar-official of the Song dynasty who served four emperors over more than five decades. He was a grand councilor during Emperor Renzong's reign.

== During Emperor Renzong's reign ==
After passing the imperial examination in 1027, Wen Yanbo first became the magistrate of Yicheng County. Later he was appointed controller-general (通判) of Jiang Prefecture. Eventually he arrived in the capital Kaifeng to serve under Emperor Renzong, first as an investigating censor (監察御史) and later as a palace censor (殿中侍御史).

In 1038, Tangut people in Song's northwestern region declared their independence, naming their state Xia (known in history as Western Xia) and invaded Song. Wen Yanbo suggested to Emperor Renzong that marshals in the front line should be given independent authorities to discipline subordinate generals for desertion and cowardice. The rule had been that marshals needed permission from the imperial court first, in order to carry out such orders. Wen argued that this rule may only be implemented during peaceful times, because during times of war, enforcement of military law and concentration of military power is of utmost importance to military commanders. Emperor Renzong took his advice and praised him.

In 1040, Western Xia army attacked Yan Prefecture. General Liu Ping (劉平) went to reinforce the city, but was ambushed and trapped in a hill. Liu sent urgent messages asking another general Huang Dehe (黃德和) to reinforce him, but Huang was afraid and deserted in the opposite direction. As a result, Liu was captured, and Huang told the emperor that Liu defected, even bribing Liu's servant to corroborate his claims. Emperor Renzong sent Wen Yanbo to Hezhong to judge the case. After careful examinations, Wen discovered the truth, but Huang, who had many "connections" in the capital, attempted to discredit Wen's findings. As a result, Emperor Renzong sent another official, Pang Ji, to re-investigate the case. Wen told Pang that he should go back as the case was already closed. Eventually Pang accepted Wen's findings and executed both Huang and Liu's servant.
