= Emperor Yingzong of Song =

Emperor of China from 1063 to 1067

Emperor Yingzong of Song 宋英宗
- Portrait kept in the National Palace Museum, Taipei, Taiwan

Emperor of the Song dynasty
- Reign: 1 May 1063 – 25 January 1067
- Coronation: 1 May 1063
- Predecessor: Emperor Renzong
- Successor: Emperor Shenzong
- Born: Zhao Zongshi (1036–1062); Zhao Shu (1062–1067); 16 February 1032 (Note: Dates given here are in the Julian calendar not the proleptic Gregorian calendar.)
- Died: 25 January 1067 (aged 34)
- Burial: Yonghou Mausoleum (永厚陵, in present-day Gongyi, Henan)
- Consorts: Empress Xuanren (m. 1046–1067)
- Issue Detail: Emperor Shenzong
Era dates
- Zhiping (治平; 1064–1067)
Posthumous name
- Emperor Tiqian Yingli Longgong Shengde Xianwen Suwu Ruisheng Xuanxiao (體乾應歷隆功盛德憲文肅武睿聖宣孝皇帝) (conferred in 1083)
Temple name
- Yingzong (英宗)
- House: Zhao
- Dynasty: Song (Northern Song)
- Father: Zhao Yunrang
- Mother: Lady Ren

Emperor Yingzong of Song
- Chinese: 宋英宗
- Literal meaning: "Heroic Ancestor of the Song"
Transcriptions
Standard Mandarin
- Hanyu Pinyin: Sòng Yīngzōng

Zhao Shu
- Traditional Chinese: 趙曙
- Simplified Chinese: 赵曙
Transcriptions
Standard Mandarin
- Hanyu Pinyin: Zhào Shǔ

Zhao Zongshi
- Traditional Chinese: 趙宗實
- Simplified Chinese: 赵宗实
Transcriptions
Standard Mandarin
- Hanyu Pinyin: Zhào Zōngshí

Emperor Yingzong of Song (16 February 1032 – 25 January 1067), personal name Zhao Shu, was the fifth emperor of the Song dynasty of China. His original personal name was Zhao Zongshi but it was changed to "Zhao Shu" in 1062 by imperial decree. He reigned from 1063 to his death in 1067. He was succeeded by his eldest son, Emperor Shenzong.

== Family background ==
Emperor Yingzong was the 13th son of Zhao Yunrang (趙允讓; 969–1059), who was a first cousin of Emperor Renzong and was posthumously known as "Prince Anyi of Pu" (濮安懿王). Emperor Yingzong's grandfather, Zhao Yuanfen (趙元份; 966–1005), was a younger brother of Emperor Renzong's father, Emperor Zhenzong, and was posthumously known as "Prince Gongjing of Shang" (商恭靖王). Emperor Yingzong's mother, whose maiden family name was Ren (任), was the concubine of Zhao Yunrang. She held the title "Xianjun (Note: Xianjun was a title literally meaning "first lady of the county," which was given to the wives of a certain category of Chinese civil servants in imperial times.) of Xianyou" (仙遊縣君).

== Early life ==
In 1055, Emperor Yingzong's predecessor, Emperor Renzong, became critically ill and started to worry about having no successor because his sons all died prematurely. Acting on the advice of his ministers, Emperor Renzong agreed to bring two of his younger male relatives into his palace. One of them was the future Emperor Yingzong, who was eventually chosen and designated as the Crown Prince. Yingzong had his name changed to "Zhao Shu" in 1062 when he was officially designated as the Crown Prince. This name became his official name when he ascended the throne in the following year after his adoptive father Emperor Renzong died in 1063.

== Reign ==
Emperor Yingzong's empress consort was Empress Gao, a niece of Empress Dowager Cao who was the widow of Emperor Renzong. As Emperor Yingzong was severely sickly shortly after his coronation, Empress Dowager Cao served as his regent. However, Empress Dowager Cao held onto power even when Yingzong recovered until the Prime Minister Han Qi removed the screen from the audience hall making it impossible for Empress Dowager Cao to attend. She was forced to give power back to Yingzong.

Emperor Yingzong's reign is known for controversy over the correct rituals to be performed by the emperor for his father. Emperor Yingzong had been adopted by Emperor Renzong, so Emperor Renzong was nominally Emperor Yingzong's father. However, biologically, Zhao Yunrang was Emperor Yingzong's father. Some officials suggested that Emperor Yingzong honour his biological father with the title "Imperial Uncle", but the emperor agreed with Ouyang Xiu and others and decided to honour his biological father as his parent. This was not only an early sign of more conflict during Emperor Xiaozong's reign but also the Great Rites Controversy of the Ming dynasty.

On April 7, 1063, Yingzong sent gifts including calligraphy made by Emperor Renzong to the Vietnamese King Ly Thanh Tong. Later, when Than Thieu Thai raided the Guangnan West Circuit, local officials to sought help from Yingzong. While Yingzong chose to ignore these requests for help, he did brand Than Thieu Thai as "reckless and mad.”

In 1065 AD, Emperor Yingzong ordered the great historian Sima Guang (1019–1086 AD) to lead with other scholars such as his chief assistants Liu Shu, Liu Ban and Fan Zuyu, the compilation of a universal history of China.

He died in 1067, caused by an illness that Yingzong contracted in 1066. He was succeeded by his son Zhao Xu who took the throne name Emperor Shenzong.

Emperor Yingzong had always been mentally ill, often distracted, physically weak, and depressed causing him to have health problems which contributed to his death at a young age.

== Family ==
- Empress Xuanren, of the Gao clan (宣仁皇后 高氏; 1032–1093)
  - Zhao Xu, Shenzong (神宗 趙頊; 1048–1085), first son
  - Zhao Hao, Prince Rong of Wu (吳榮王 趙顥; 1050–1096), second son
  - Princess Hehui (惠和帝姬; d. 1085), first daughter
    - Married Wang Shiyue (王師約) in 1066
  - Princess Xianhui (賢惠帝姬; 1051–1080), second daughter
    - Married Wang Shen (1036–1093), and had issue (one son)
  - Princess Xiande (賢德帝姬; 1051–1123), third daughter
    - Married Zhang Dunli (張敦禮; d. 1107) in 1068, and had issue (one son, one daughter)
  - Zhao Yan, Prince of Run (潤王 趙顏), third son
  - Zhao Yun, Prince Duanxian of Yi (益端獻王 趙頵; 1056–1088), fourth son
  - Princess De'an (德安帝姬), fourth daughter
    - Married Xu Jue (許珏), and had issue (two sons)
- Zhaoyi, of the Bao clan (昭儀 鮑氏)
- Xiurong, of the Zhang clan (張修容)
- Guiyi, of the Zhang clan (貴儀 張氏)
- Cairen, of the Yang clan (才人 楊氏)

== Literary and other cultural references ==
- Portrayed by Feng Hui in the 2018–2019 Chinese TV series The Story of Minglan.

== See also ==
- Chinese emperors family tree (middle)
- List of emperors of the Song dynasty
- Architecture of the Song dynasty
- Culture of the Song dynasty
- Economy of the Song dynasty
- History of the Song dynasty
- Society of the Song dynasty
- Technology of the Song dynasty

Emperor Yingzong of Song House of Zhao Born: 16 February 1032 Died: 25 January 1067
Regnal titles
Preceded by Emperor Renzong	Emperor of the Song Dynasty; 1063–1067	Succeeded by Emperor Shenzong
