= Empress Cao (Song dynasty) =

Chinese empress (1016–1079)

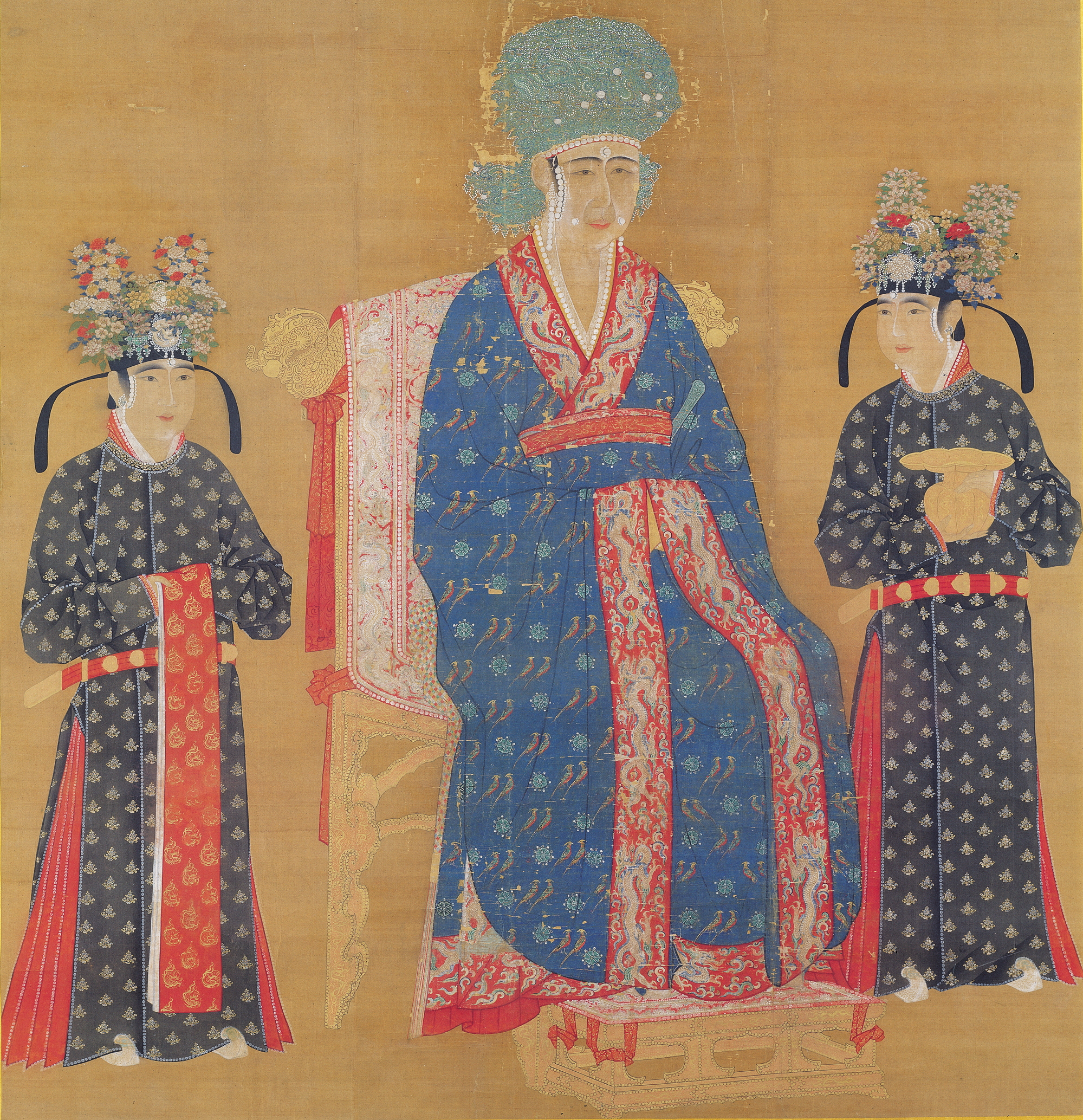
- Empress Cao in the middle, with assistants

Regent of the Song dynasty
- Regency: 1 May 1063 - 10 June 1064

Grand empress dowager of the Song dynasty
- Tenure: 25 January 1067 - 16 November 1079

Empress dowager of the Song dynasty
- Tenure: 30 April 1063 - 25 January 1067

Empress consort of the Song dynasty
- Tenure: 24 December 1034 - 30 April 1063
- Born: 1016
- Died: 16 November 1079 (aged 63)
- Spouse: Emperor Renzong of Song
Posthumous name
- Empress Cisheng Guangxian (慈聖光獻皇后)

Empress Cao (1016 - 16 November 1079) was a Chinese empress consort of the Song dynasty, married to Emperor Renzong of Song. She served as regent of China during the illness of Renzong's successor Emperor Yingzong, from 1063 until 1064.

== Life ==
Cao was born in modern Hebei Province. She was the granddaughter of Cao Bin, one of the founding generals of the Song Dynasty. She was a painter, calligrapher, and gardener, and proved to be a wise choice as empress. Unlike her predecessor, Empress Liu, who had bestowed favors upon her own family, Empress Cao refrained from seeking or allowing any special privileges for her relatives.

=== Empress ===
In 1033, after the death of Empress Dowager Liu, Emperor Renzong deposed his first empress, Guo, under the pretext of her not bearing children, and she was confined to Chang Ning Palace. Emperor Renzong originally intended to appoint Chen, the daughter of a merchant as empress, but this proposal faced opposition from state officials and ministers. Consequently, eighteen-year-old Cao was summoned to the palace and was made empress in September of the following year.

Before marrying Emperor Renzong, Empress Cao had a brief previous marriage. She was known for her virtuous and gentle character, but perhaps due to her less attractive appearance or other reasons, she did not win the emperor's favor and remained somewhat distant from him. Nonetheless, she was wise and tolerant, showing no jealousy towards the emperor's favored concubines, such as Zhang Guifei, Miao Zhaorong, and Yu Jieyu. Empress Cao came from a distinguished military family and was very adept at managing her own affairs. She was well-versed in the classics and history, skilled in the semi-cursive script (a style of calligraphy), and personally led the palace women in planting grains and raising silkworms in the garden.

Empress Cao was respected by state officials, who did not oppose her to assist the emperor in governing the state during his illnesses and attended to state affairs by his side. In 5 March 1048, an uprising of the imperial guards took place in her personal palace against the Emperor, and Cao was credited in saving his life. The Emperor initially blamed Cao for the uprising because it had taken place in her palace. However, he accepted the result of the following investigation, which concluded that the rumor that Cao had been behind the uprising was slander.

Empress Cao had no children, and in 1036, the emperor adopted his four-year-old cousin, the future Emperor Yingzong, and appointed him heir to the throne. Cao became the foster mother of the Crown Prince, and she also selected her niece, the future Empress Gao (Song dynasty), to become her daughter-in-law.

=== Regency ===
In 1063, her adoptive son, Emperor Yingzong, succeeded her spouse as Emperor. Shortly after his succession, however, he became severely ill, and the officials asked her to govern as regent during his illness. Empress Dowager Cao accepted and ruled China as regent for a little over a year. She was cautioned with the bad example of Empress Liu, who was said to have favored her relatives in politics and usurped Imperial rituals for herself, and Cao was careful not to do this during her regency. She gave audience to the councilors behind a lowered screen in a smaller hall rather than in the main throne hall, and she was not given Imperial prerogatives. When the Emperor recovered in 1064, the officials asked her to step down from regency and let him govern by himself, but she refused. Opponent prime minister Han Qi then removed the screen from the audience hall while the court was in session, which made it impossible for her to attend and forced her to retire as regent.

=== Later life ===
In 1067, Emperor Shenzong succeeded to the throne, and Cao was given the title Grand Empress Dowager. Shenzong was sometimes willing to listen to her advice, and she managed to have the imprisonment of the conservative poet Su Shi transformed to exile.

== Anecdote ==
Consort Zhang, Emperor Renzong's favorite, once sought to challenge Empress Cao's authority. She requested to borrow the empress's chariot and ceremonial entourage for an outing. Knowing this violated protocol, Emperor Renzong suggested she ask the empress herself. Surprisingly, Empress Cao agreed. Overjoyed, Zhang prepared for the outing, but Renzong, realizing the impropriety, sternly reminded her: "Ceremonial rules exist for a reason, and violating rank will invite court criticism." Though displeased, Zhang had no choice but to abandon the idea.

In the first year of Renzong's Jiayou era (1056-1063), the emperor fell ill. The ministers went to the inner court to inquire on his wellbeing. The emperor suddenly rushed out from his inner chambers and shouted loudly, "The Empress (Empress Cao) and Zhang Maoze are plotting treason!" His words were extremely incoherent. Upon hearing this, Zhang Maoze immediately attempted to hang himself, but were stopped by the attendants on presence. The prime minister Wen Yanbo, scolded him, saying, "The emperor is ill, and his words are nothing more than delirium caused by sickness. Why would you act so rashly? If you died, how could the Empress hold herself?" He then ordered Zhang Maoze to remain in attendance on the emperor and not leave his side without permission.

During Emperor Shenzong's reign, distinguished poet Su Shi was once arrested and imprisoned by the censorate amid the Crow Terrace Poetry Trial. At the time, Grand Empress Dowager Cao said to Emperor Shenzong, "I recall Emperor Renzong happily returning after holding the imperial examination and cheered, 'Today, I have found two capable prime ministers for my descendants.' Those were Su Shi and Su Zhe. How can you kill Su Shi?" Empress Dowager Cao died shortly after, and only a month later, Emperor Shenzong demoted Su Shi to Huangzhou as his penalty, instead of a more severe one.

== In Popular Fiction ==
- Empress Cao was portrayed by Jiang Shuying in Serenade of Peaceful Joy.
- Empress Cao was portrayed by Yang Qing in The Story of Minglan.
- She is known as the older sister of Cao Guojiu, the eighth of the Eight Immortals.

== Bibliography ==
- Li, Tao (1182). "續資治通鑑長編". wiki Source Chinese 维基文库.

Chinese royalty
Preceded by Empress Guo (Renzong)	Empress of China; 24 December 1034 - 30 April 1063	Succeeded by Empress Gao (Song dynasty)
