= Emperor Renzong of Song =

Chinese emperor from 1022 to 1063

Emperor Renzong of Song 宋仁宗
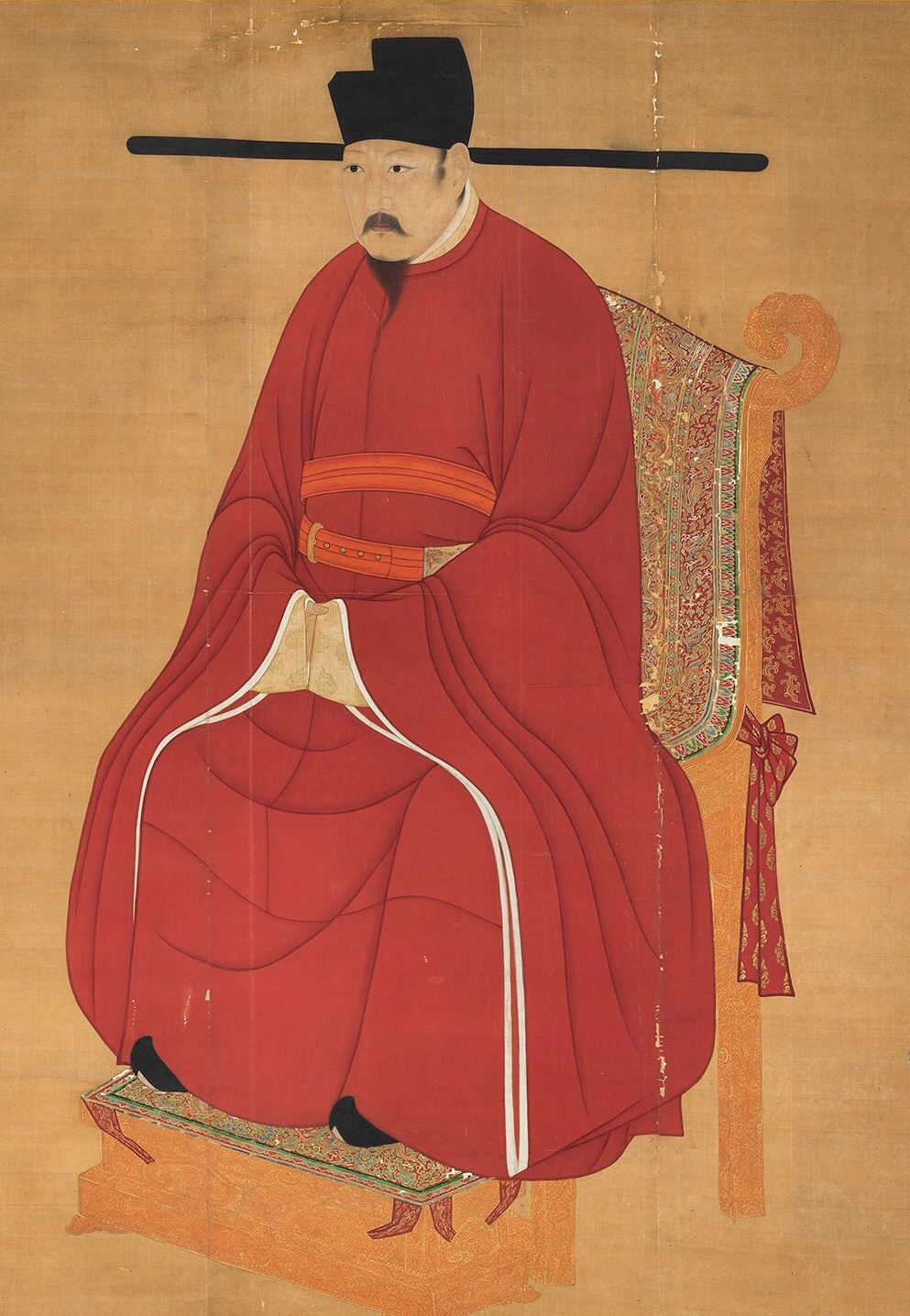
- Palace portrait on a hanging scroll, kept in the National Palace Museum, Taipei, Taiwan

Emperor of the Song dynasty
- Reign: 24 March 1022 – 30 April 1063
- Enthronement: 24 March 1022
- Predecessor: Zhenzong
- Successor: Yingzong
- Regent: Empress Dowager Liu (1022–1033)
- Born: Zhao Zhen (趙禎); 30 May 1010 (Note: 14th day of the 4th month of the 3rd year of the Dazhong Xiangfu era (大中祥符三年四月十四日)); Northern Song
- Died: 30 April 1063 (aged 52) (Note: 29th day of the 3rd month of the 8th year of the Jiayou era (嘉祐八年三月廿九日)); Bianliang, Northern Song
- Burial: Yongzhao Mausoleum (永昭陵), Gongyi, Henan Province, China
- Spouse(s): Empress Guo (m. 1024; dep. 1033) Empress Cisheng (m. 1033–1063) Empress Wencheng (died 1054)
- Issue Detail: Princess Zhuangxiao
Era dates
- Tiansheng (天聖; "Heavenly Saint"; 1023–1032); Mingdao (明道; "Bright Thinking"; 1032–1033); Jingyou (景祐; "Revered Protection"; 1034–1038); Baoyuan (寶元; "Precious Prime"; 1038–1040); Kangding (康定; "Peaceful Order"; 1040–1041); Qingli (慶曆; "Celebrated Calendar"; 1041–1048); Huangyou (皇祐; "Sovereign Protection"; 1049–1053); Zhihe (至和; "Extreme Peace"; 1054–1056); Jiayou (嘉祐; "Praised Protection"; 1056–1063)
Posthumous name
- Emperor Titian Fadao Jigong Quande Shenwen Shengwu Ruizhe Mingxiao (體天法道極功全德神文聖武睿哲明孝皇帝) (conferred in 1083)
Temple name
- Renzong (仁宗)
- House: Zhao
- Dynasty: Song
- Father: Emperor Zhenzong
- Mother: Empress Zhangyi

Emperor Renzong of Song
- Chinese: 宋仁宗
- Literal meaning: "Benevolent Ancestor of the Song"
Transcriptions
Standard Mandarin
- Hanyu Pinyin: Sòng Rénzōng
- Wade–Giles: Sung^{4} Jen^{2}-tsung^{1}
- IPA: [sʊ̂ŋ ɻə̌n.tsʊ́ŋ]

Zhao Zhen
- Traditional Chinese: 趙禎
- Simplified Chinese: 赵祯
Transcriptions
Standard Mandarin
- Hanyu Pinyin: Zhào Zhēn
- Wade–Giles: Chao^{4} Chen^{1}
- IPA: [ʈʂâʊ ʈʂə́n]

Zhao Shouyi
- Traditional Chinese: 趙受益
- Simplified Chinese: 赵受益
Transcriptions
Standard Mandarin
- Hanyu Pinyin: Zhào Shòuyì
- Wade–Giles: Chao^{4} Shou^{4}-i^{4}
- IPA: [ʈʂâʊ ʂôʊ.î]

Emperor Renzong of Song (30 May 1010 – 30 April 1063), personal name Zhao Zhen, was the fourth emperor of the Northern Song dynasty of China. He reigned for about 41 years from 1022 to his death in 1063, making him the longest reigning Song dynasty emperor. He was the sixth son of his predecessor, Emperor Zhenzong, and was succeeded by his cousin's son, Zhao Shu who took the throne as Emperor Yingzong because his own sons died prematurely.

== Early life and ascension to the throne ==
Emperor Renzong's father Emperor Zhenzong died in 1022 leaving the 12 year-old Renzong as the new emperor. His adoptive mother Empress Liu acted as the regent before Renzong reached maturity. By 1027, Renzong was old enough to rule on his own but Liu refused to step down and ruled until her death in 1033.

== Reign ==
Compared to other renowned Chinese emperors, Emperor Renzong is less well-known. His reign represented the zenith of the Song Dynasty's influence and power, yet it also marked the onset of a gradual decline that would continue for over one and a half centuries. A contributing factor to this decline was potentially the dynasty's foreign policy during his tenure.

=== Foreign Policy and Relations ===
The official policy of the Song Empire at the time was of pacifism and this caused the weakening of its military. The Tangut-led Western Xia state took advantage of this deterioration and waged small scale wars against the Song Empire near the borders.

In 1038, the Tangut chieftain Li Yuanhao named himself emperor of Da Xia and demanded Emperor Renzong recognise him as an equal. The Song court recognised Li Yuanhao as governor but not as "emperor", a title it regarded as exclusive to the Song emperor. After intense diplomatic contacts, in 1043 the Tangut state accepted the recognition of the Song emperor as emperor in exchange for annual gifts, which implied tacit recognition on the part of the Song of the military power of the Tanguts.

When Emperor Renzong came to power, he issued decrees to strengthen the military and paid massive bribes to the Khitan-led Liao dynasty, an adversary of Western Xia, in the hope that this would ensure the safety of the Song Empire. However, these policies involved a heavy price. Taxes were increased severely and the peasants lived in a state of perpetual poverty. This eventually caused organized rebellions to take place throughout the country and the breakdown of the Song government, including that of Nong Zhigao.

=== Political and Economic Reform ===
Renzong is known for his reform attempt known as the Qingli Reforms (慶歷新政, Qingli Xinzheng), initiated around 1040–1045, represented a significant reform movement aimed at strengthening the government and improving administrative efficiency. Advocated by the statesman Fan Zhongyan, Fu Bi, Han Qi, and Ouyang Xiu, the reforms were aimed to strengthen agricultural production, reclaim lands, reduce sub-official level administrative units, and more importantly, enhance national defense by organizing local militias and reduce military expenditures. While these policies were progressive and intended to address systemic issues, they encountered resistance from conservative factions within the government and were eventually rescinded following Fan Zhongyan's resignation from office. Despite their brief implementation, the Qingli Reforms are regarded as a precursor to later, more extensive reforms in the Song Dynasty and hold an important place in Chinese historical studies.

=== Cultural Achievements ===
During the reign of Emperor Renzong, the Song Dynasty experienced a significant cultural and literary flourishing. This period saw the emergence of some of the most esteemed literati in Chinese history. Figures such as Yan Shu, Fan Zhongyan, Ouyang Xiu and Mei Yaochen all lived through this era and commenced or developed their literary careers during Renzong's reign.

A landmark event in 1057, under Renzong's rule, was the Imperial Examination, which admitted several candidates destined to achieve nationwide acclaim. Among the candidates were Zeng Gong, Su Shi, and Su Zhe, accompanied by their father Su Xun. These scholars would later be recognized as some of the most influential literati in Chinese history.

Emperor Renzong elevated the 46th-generation descendants of Confucius to the current title of Duke Yansheng. They were previously of lower noble ranks.

=== Science and Technology ===
During the reign of Emperor Renzong (1022–1063), China experienced notable advancements in science and technology. This period is marked by significant progress in areas such as astronomy, printing technology, agriculture, engineering, and military technology. Astronomical studies led to improvements in the calendar system and the construction of advanced observatories. Agricultural productivity was enhanced through the introduction of new tools and techniques, including the iron plow and the dragon backbone pump. In terms of engineering, the period saw the development of sophisticated construction techniques used in large-scale projects like bridges and dams.

The era witnessed a revolution in printing with the invention of movable type by Bi Sheng around 1040. The Song Dynasty is also credited with the first recorded use of gunpowder in warfare, marking a significant development in military technology during Renzong's reign.

In 1054 during his reign, Chinese astronomers recorded the explosion of SN 1054, a supernova.

=== Death and Succession ===
In 1055, Emperor Renzong became critically ill and started to worry about having no successor because his sons all died prematurely. Acting on the advice of his ministers, Emperor Renzong agreed to bring two of his younger male relatives into his palace. One of them was his nephew Zhao Zongshi, the future Emperor Yingzong, who was eventually chosen and designated as the Crown Prince.

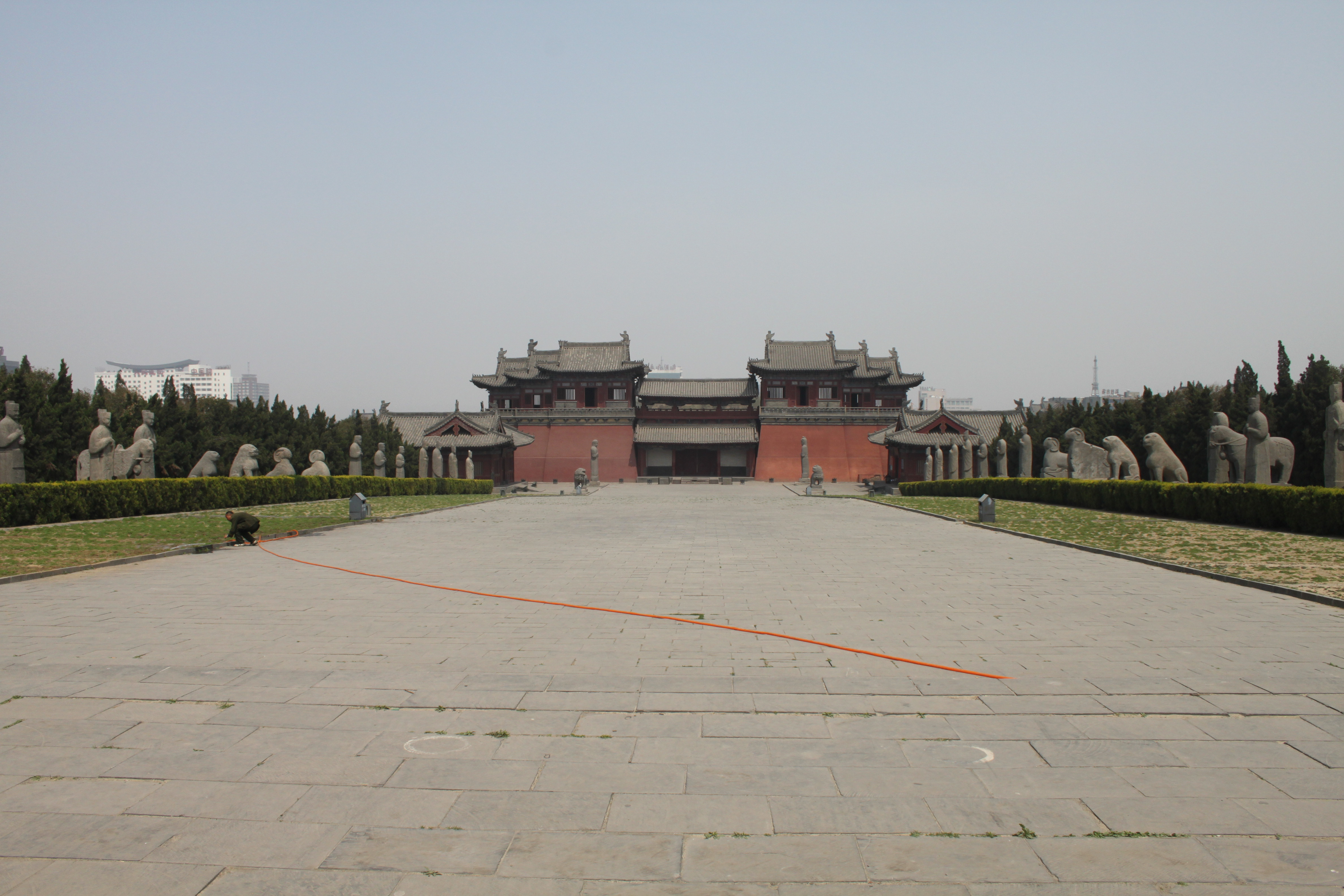
Yongzhao Mausoleum, Tomb of Emperor Renzong

Renzong died in 1063 and was succeeded by Emperor Yingzong. The nation mourned his death, from the new Emperor to the ordinaries. Across the northern border, Emperor Daozong of Liao and his people were also found lamenting in tears, as the two countries enjoyed a relatively peaceful period spanning 42 years during Renzong's reign.

=== Legacy ===
In the book History of Song compiled by historians of the Yuan Dynasty, Renzong is portrayed a merciful, tolerant, modest, lenient, and frugal emperor known for restraining his personal sentiments in service to the throne. As recorded in the book, Emperor Renzong worked late one night and found himself craving mutton. However, just as a servant was about to instruct the cooks to prepare the dish, Renzong intervened. He expressed concern that ordering mutton might lead to excess and wastefulness as the cooks may start to prepare it regularly. Choosing to endure his hunger rather than risk unnecessary waste, he displayed a commitment to frugality and thoughtful governance. On another account, Renzong ordered that officers of government must be very cautious in using the death penalty, and if an officer wrongly sentenced an innocent person to death even once, he would never be promoted. Renzong once remarked to his ministers: "I have never used the word 'death' to scold others, how dare I abuse the death penalty?"

Su Shi remarked about peace and good government during Renzong's period in Song history: "For more than seventy years the Song dynasty has flourished without people knowing the perils of war, but enjoying the blessings of affluence and education." Song Dynasty Confucian scholar Fan Zuyu also praised Emperor Renzong for his good government, which, he claimed, grew out of the five traditional virtues that distinguished the "benevolent emperor" from all other rulers: "Emperor Renzong feared Heaven, he loved his people, he sacrificed to his ancestors, he was fond of learning, and he obeyed admonitions. Practicing these five virtues is what is called 'being benevolent'".

== Family ==
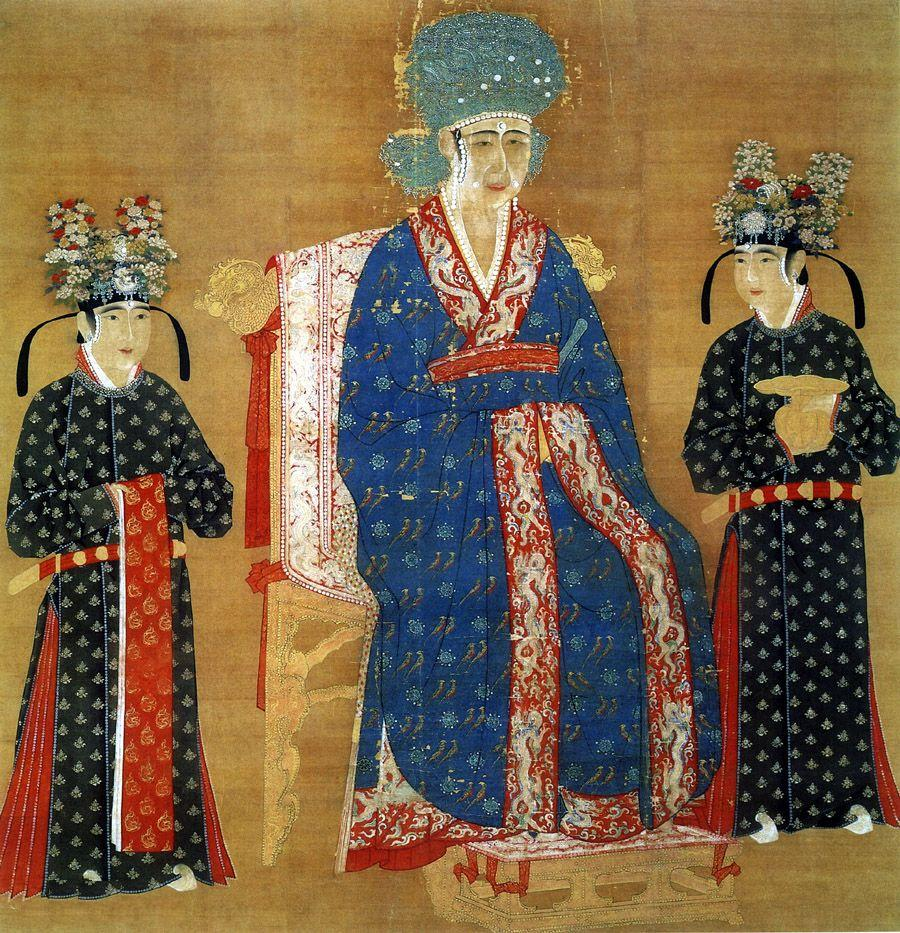
Official portrait of Empress Cao, wife of Emperor Renzong

- Empress, of the Guo clan (郭清悟皇后 郭氏; 1012–1035)
- Empress Cisheng, of the Cao clan (慈聖皇后 曹氏; 1016–1079)
- Empress Wencheng, of the Zhang clan (溫成皇后 張氏; 1024–1054)
  - Princess Zhuangshun (莊順帝姬; 1040–1042), third daughter
  - Princess Zhuangqi (莊齊帝姬; 1042–1043), fourth daughter
  - Princess Zhuangshen (莊慎帝姬; 1044–1045), eighth daughter
- Noble Consort Zhaojie, of the Miao clan (昭節貴妃 苗氏; 1017–1086)
  - Princess Zhuangxiao (莊孝帝姬; 1038–1071), first daughter
    - Married Li Wei (李瑋; d. 1086)
  - Zhao Xin, Prince of Yong (雍王 趙昕; 1039–1041), second son
- Noble Consort Zhaoshu, of the Zhou clan (昭淑貴妃 周氏; 1022–1114)
  - Princess Lingde (令德帝姬; 1058–1142), tenth daughter
    - Married Qian Jingzhen of Wuyue, Prince Xianning (吳越 錢景臻; 1043–1126) in 1067, and had issue (one son)
  - Princess Yimu (懿穆帝姬; d. 1112), 12th daughter
    - Married Guo Xianqing (郭獻卿) in 1082
- Noble Consort Zhaoyi, of the Zhang clan (昭懿貴妃 張氏)
- Pure Consort, of the Dong clan (淑妃 董氏; d. 1062)
  - Princess Zhuangqi (莊齊帝姬; 1059–1067), ninth daughter
  - Princess Xianyi (賢懿帝姬; 1059–1083), 11th daughter
    - Married Cao Shi (曹詩) in 1076
  - Princess Zhuangyan (莊儼帝姬; 1061), 13th daughter
- Virtuous Consort, of the Yu clan (德妃 兪氏; d. 1064)
  - Zhao Fang, Prince of Yang (楊王 趙昉; 1037), first son
  - Princess Zhuanghe (莊和帝姬; d. 1042), second daughter
- Virtuous Consort, of the Yang clan (德妃 楊氏; 1019–1073)
  - Princess Zhuangxuan (莊宣帝姬; 1042), sixth daughter
- Able Consort, of the Feng clan (賢妃 馮氏)
  - Princess Zhuangxi (莊禧帝姬; 1042–1043), fifth daughter
  - Princess Zhuangyi (莊夷帝姬; d. 1044), seventh daughter
- Talented Lady, of the Zhu clan (才人 朱氏)
  - Zhao Xi, Prince of Jing (荊王 趙曦; 1041–1043), third son

== Literary and other Cultural References ==
- Portrayed by Qin Yan in the 2018–2019 Chinese TV series The Story of Minglan

== See also ==
- Chinese emperors family tree (middle)
- List of emperors of the Song dynasty
- Architecture of the Song dynasty
- Culture of the Song dynasty
- Economy of the Song dynasty
- History of the Song dynasty
- Society of the Song dynasty
- Technology of the Song dynasty

== Notes ==
Emperor Renzong of Song House of Zhao Born: 30 May 1010 Died: 30 April 1063[aged 52]
Regnal titles
Preceded by Emperor Zhenzong	Emperor of the Song Dynasty; 1022–1063 (With the Empress dowager Liu)	Succeeded by Emperor Yingzong
