= Wen Wu temple =

Type of Chinese temple combining martial and civil temples

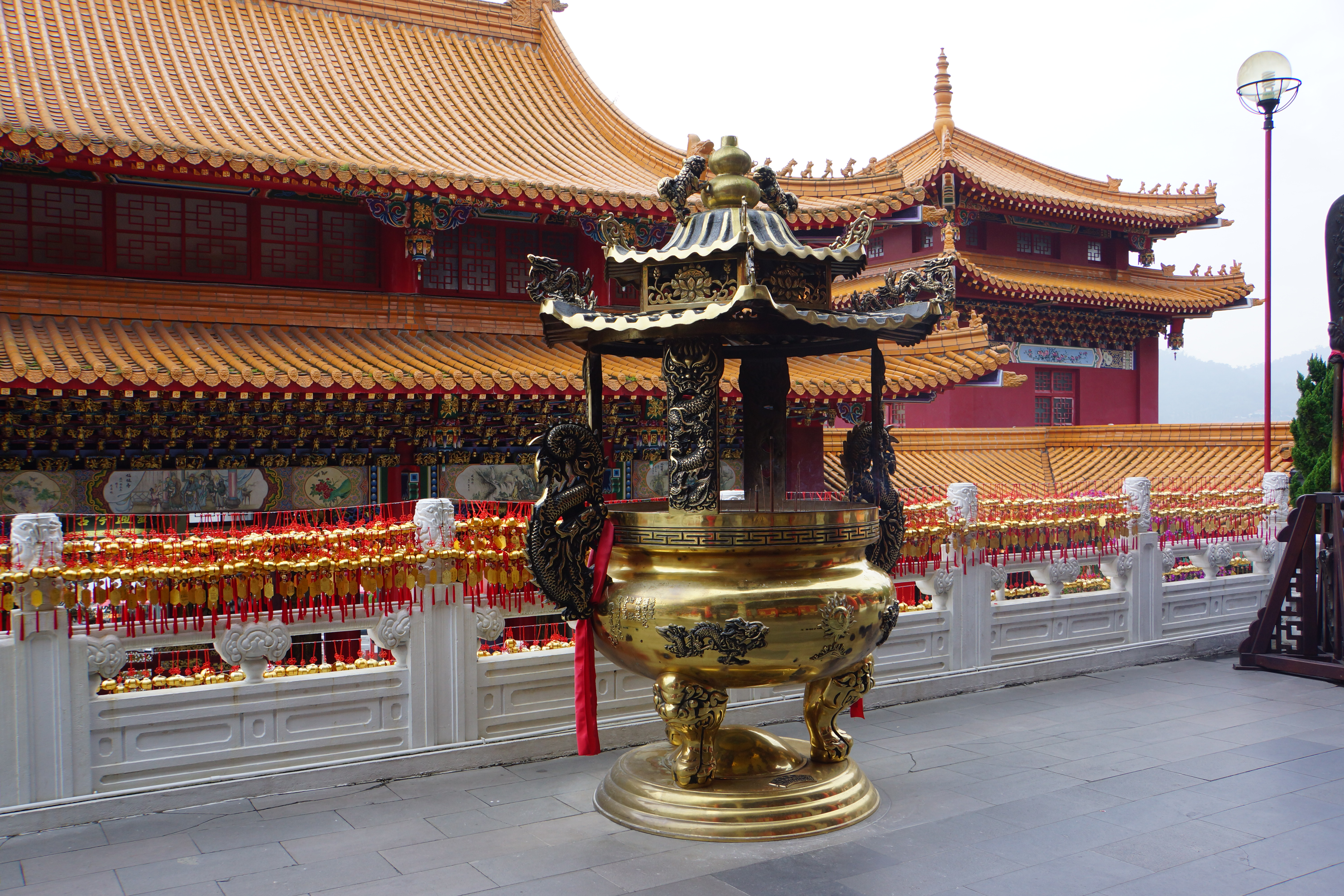
Sun Moon Lake Wen Wu Temple in Taiwan

A Wen Wu temple or Wenwu temple (Chinese: 文武廟) is a dual temple in China venerating the two patron gods of civil and martial affairs in the same temple complex. In southern China, the civil god or Wéndì (Chinese: 文帝) is Wenchang (Chinese: 文昌), while in the north it is Confucius; in both north and south the martial god or Wǔdì (Chinese: 武帝) is Lord Guan (Chinese: 關帝). Although single temples to either the civil or martial god alone are widespread, it is comparatively rare to find temples venerating both. During the Ming and Qing dynasties, Wen Wu temples were patronised by those seeking success in the Imperial examinations, which were divided into civil and military examinations, and by those seeking advancement in professions which could be interpreted as falling under the aegis of one of the gods. Thus, to the present day, civil servants make offerings to the civil god, and police officers to the martial god.

== Examples of Wen Wu temples ==
=== Mainland China ===
- Danleng Weng Wu Temple, in Meishan Sichuan, constructed during the Yongxi period (984—987 CE) of the reign of Emperor Taizong of Song, reconstructed during the reign of the Jiajing Emperor (1522–1566) during the Ming Dynasty and expanded in the seventh year (1827 CE) of the Daoguang Emperor of Qing. The temple is said to be the alma mater of Su Shi.

=== Hong Kong ===
The Cantonese transliteration of 文武廟 is Man Mo Miu (see article for details). There are temples in

- Sheung Wan
- Tai Po
- Pak Ngan Heung, Mui Wo, Lantau Island

=== Taiwan ===
In Taiwan there are Wen Wu temples in

- Lukang, Changhua, Lukang Wen Wu Temple
- Sun Moon Lake, the Sun Moon Lake Wen Wu Temple was built after rising water levels from building a dam forced several smaller temples to be removed.
- New Taipei City

== See also ==
- Temple of Confucius
- Martial temple
- State Temple of the Martial God
- Hip Tin temples in Hong Kong
- Kwan Tai temples in Hong Kong
