= Shangyi Town =

Shangyi Town may refer to these towns in China:

- Shangyi, Guangdong, in Zijin County, Guangdong
- Shangyi, Sichuan, in Meishan, Sichuan

== See also ==
- Shangyi County, Hebei
- Shang Yi, Chinese footballer
