= Shangyi, Sichuan =

Shangyi 尚义镇
- Town
- Location in Sichuan
- Coordinates: 30°5′51″N 103°45′29″E
- Country: People's Republic of China
- Province: Sichuan
- Prefecture-level city: Meishan
- District: Dongpo District
- Time zone: UTC+8 (China Standard)

Shangyi (Chinese: 尚义; pinyin: Shàngyì) is a town under the administration of Dongpo District, Meishan, Sichuan, China. As of 2020, it administers the following ten residential communities and seven villages:

- Liuxiang Community (刘巷社区)
- Xiyan Community (西堰社区)
- Quanyi Community (全意社区)
- Qili Community (七里社区)
- Xiang'er Community (象耳社区)
- Baima Community (白马社区)
- Zhongdian Community (中店社区)
- Hongqi Community (红旗社区)
- Yingyong Community (英勇社区)
- Wanhua Community (万华社区)
- Shulin Village (舒林村)
- Yunge Village (云阁村)
- Taibao Village (太宝村)
- Guanyin Village (观音村)
- Qiaolou Village (桥楼村)
- Tielu Village (铁炉村)
- Gong Village (龚村)

In December 2019, the towns of Xiang'er and Baima were abolished, with Shangyi absorbing their administrative areas.
