= Sun Moon Lake Wen Wu Temple =

Temple in Yuchi, Nantou County, Taiwan

- 日月潭文武廟
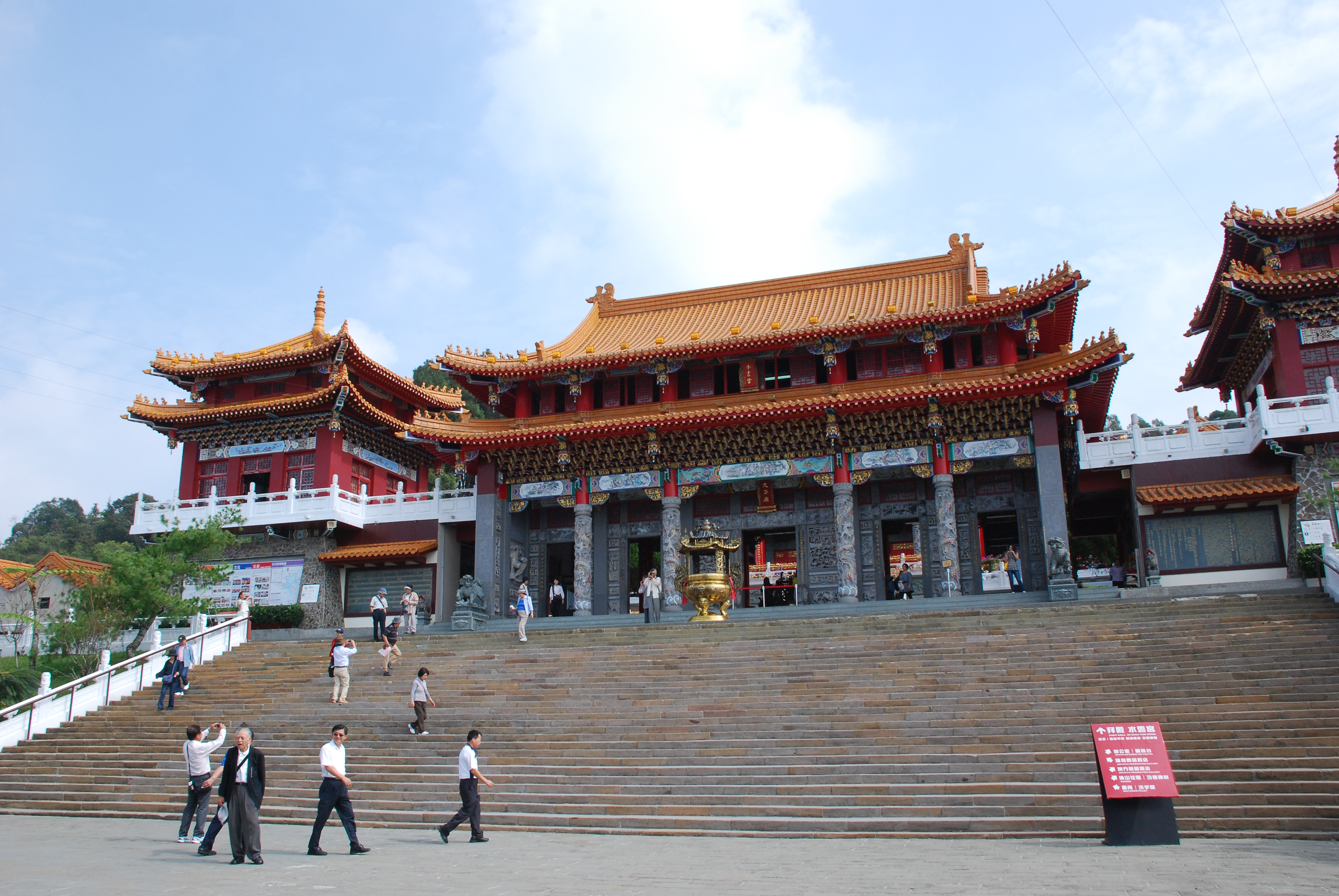

- Location within Nantou County

Location
- Location: Yuchi, Nantou County, Taiwan
- Interactive map of Sun Moon Lake Wen Wu Temple
- Coordinates: 23°52′11.9″N 120°55′38.9″E

Architecture
- Type: Wen Wu temple
- Completed: 1938 (original building); 1969 (current building)

Website
- Official website (in Chinese)

The Sun Moon Lake Wen Wu Temple (Chinese: 日月潭文武廟; pinyin: Rìyuètán Wénwǔ Miào) is a Wen Wu temple located on the perimeter of Sun Moon Lake in Yuchi Township, Nantou County, Taiwan.

== History ==
Previously, two temples were located on the coast of Sun Moon Lake. In 1919, the Japanese colonial government constructed a dam to generate hydroelectric power, causing the lake's water level to rise. The two temples were subsequently torn down and consolidated at the temple's present location in 1938.

After the Japanese handed over Taiwan to the Republic of China in 1945, the government invested in developing tourism around the lake. Wen Wu temple was rebuilt again in 1969, increasing its size and constructing it in the Chinese palace style.

== Architecture ==
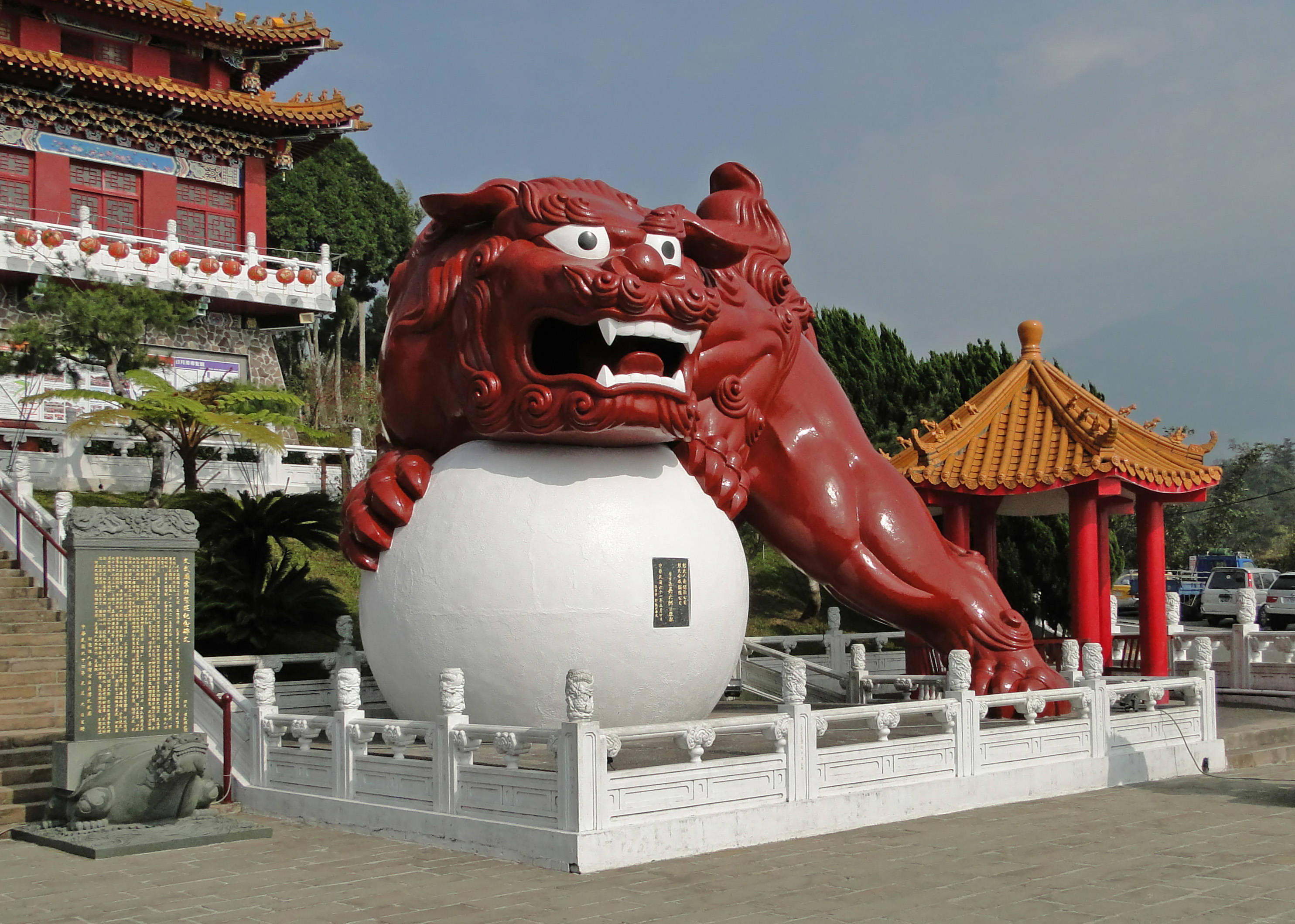
Chinese guardian lion

The temple consists of three halls. The first hall, located on the second floor of the front hall, is a shrine devoted to the First Ancestor Kaiji and the God of Literature. The central hall is devoted to Lord Guan, the Martial God, and another Martial God, Lord Yue. The rear hall is dedicated to Confucius. Chinese guardian lions are located in front of the temple, one male and one female. Lions have not been found at Wen Wu Temples in Mainland China.

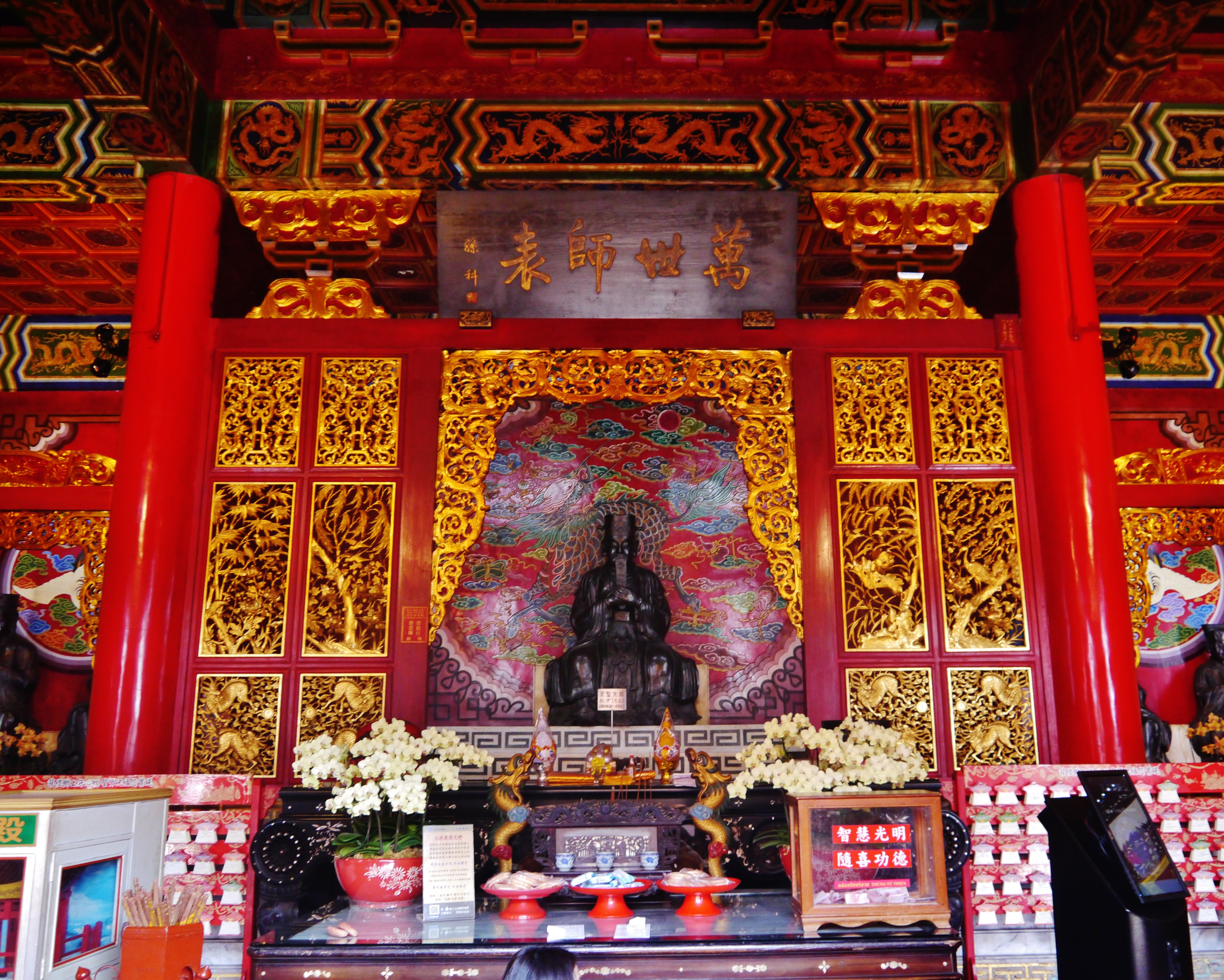
Statue of Confucius

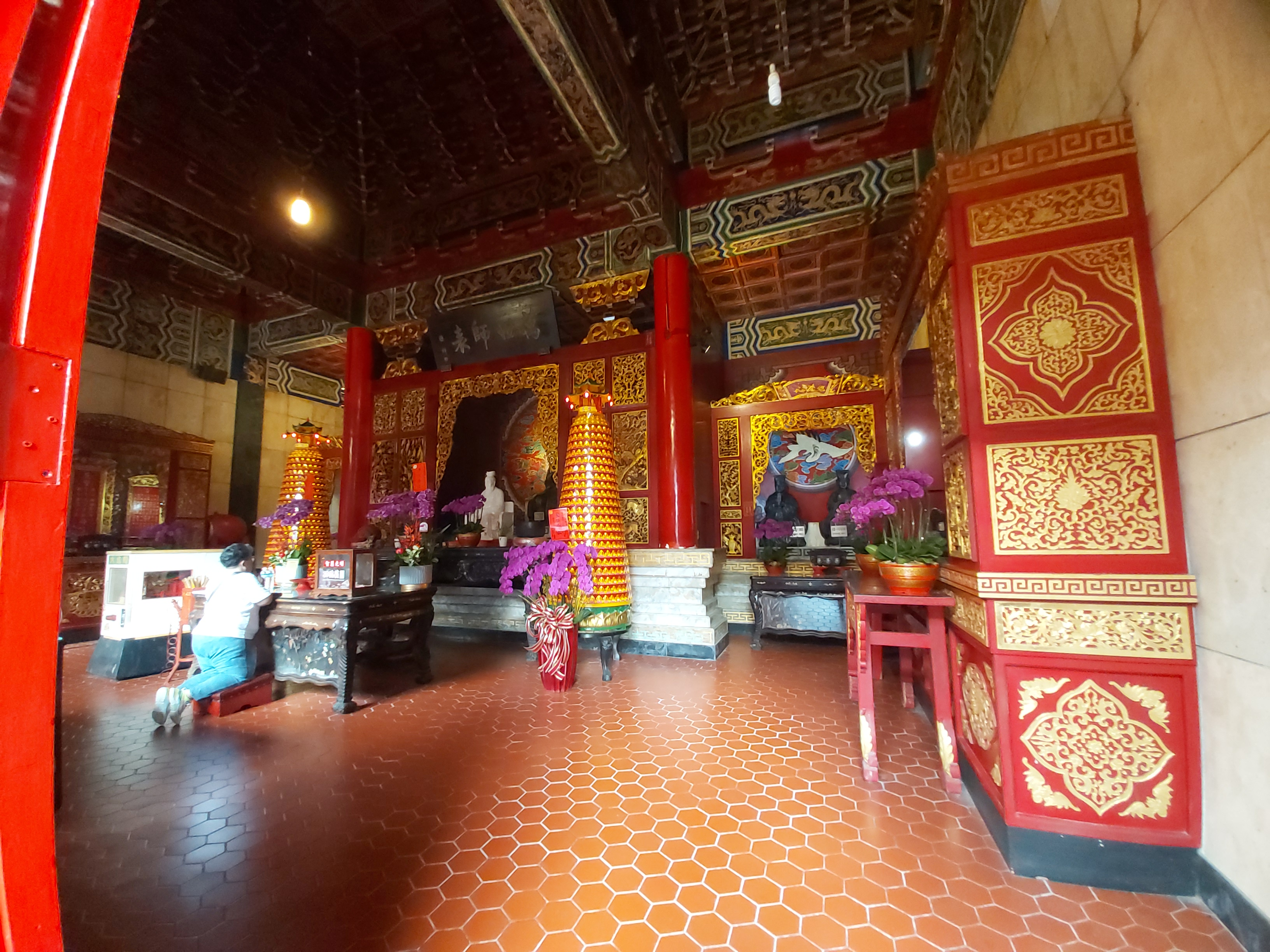
The rear hall, statue of Zengzi and Zisi

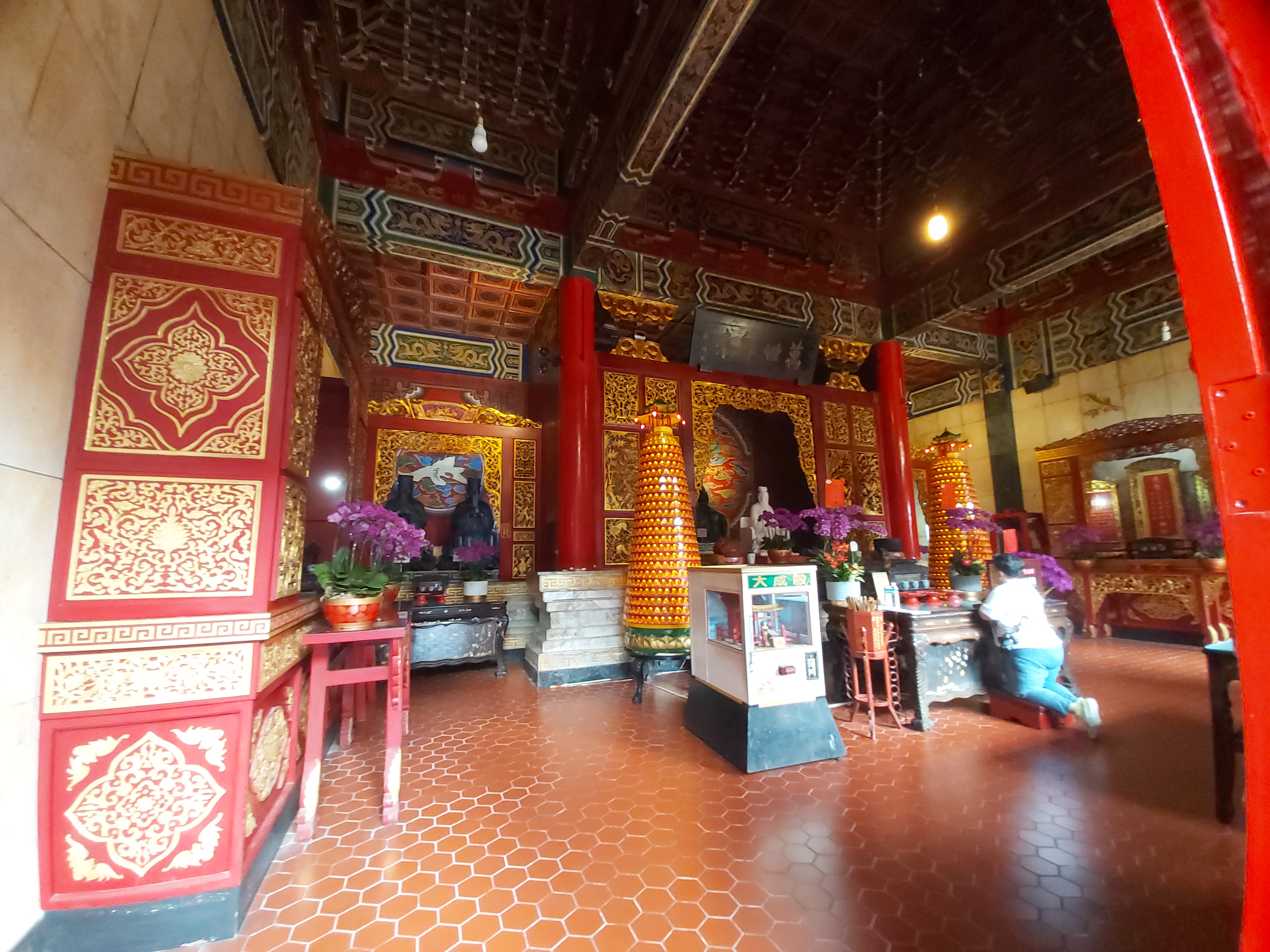
The rear hall, statue of Mencius and Yan Hui

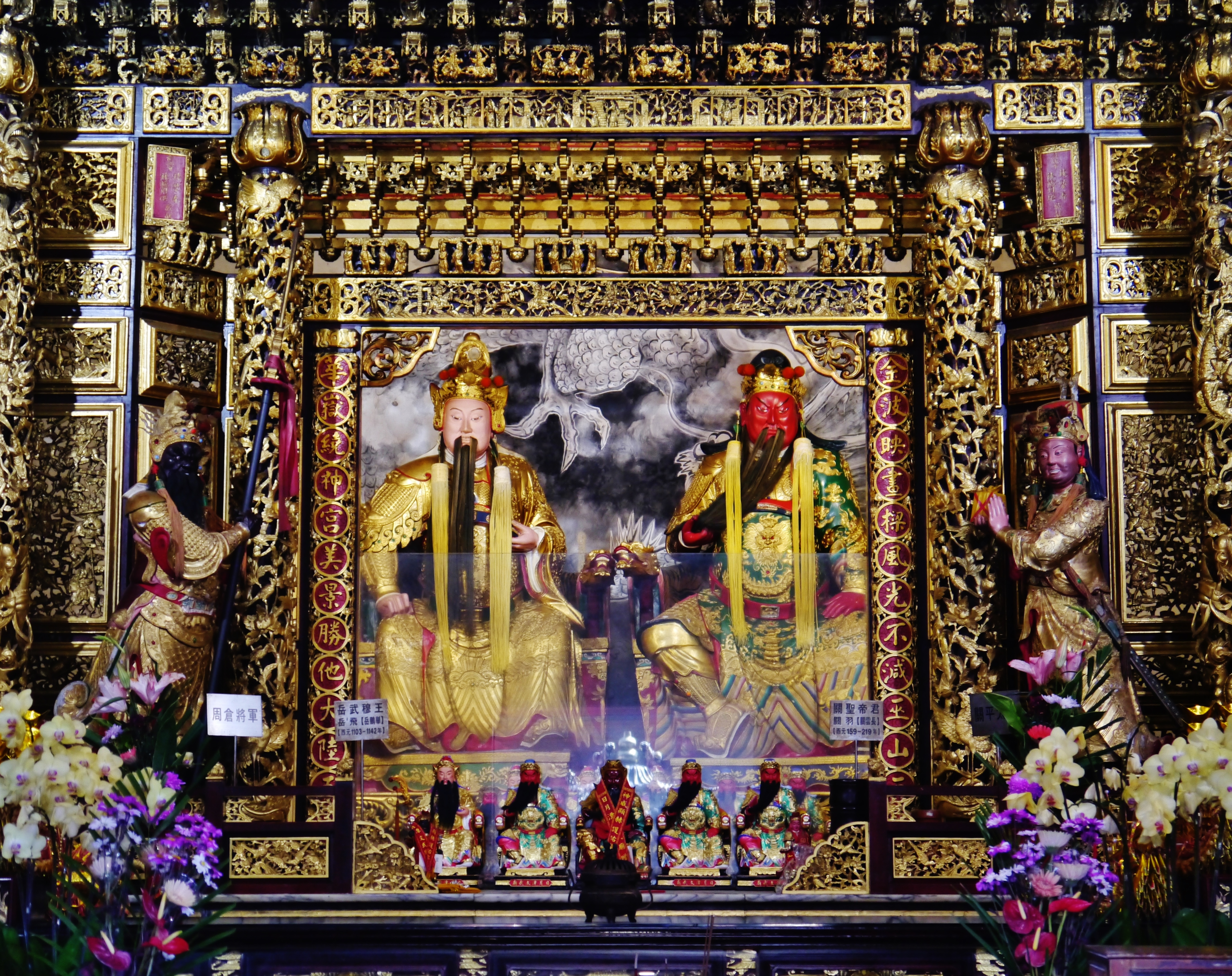
Statue of Lord Guan (right) and Lord Yue

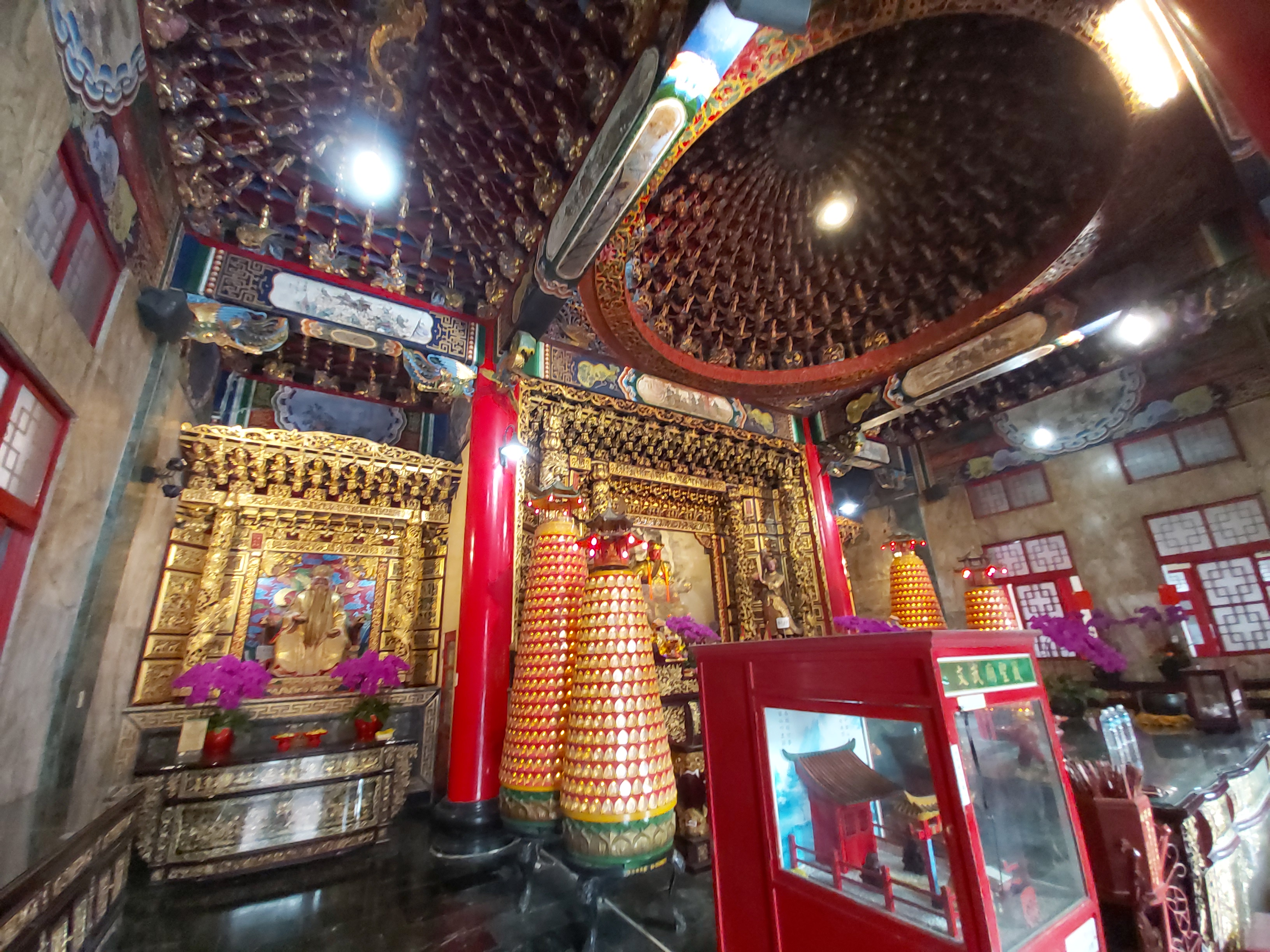
The central hall, statue of Tudigong (left)

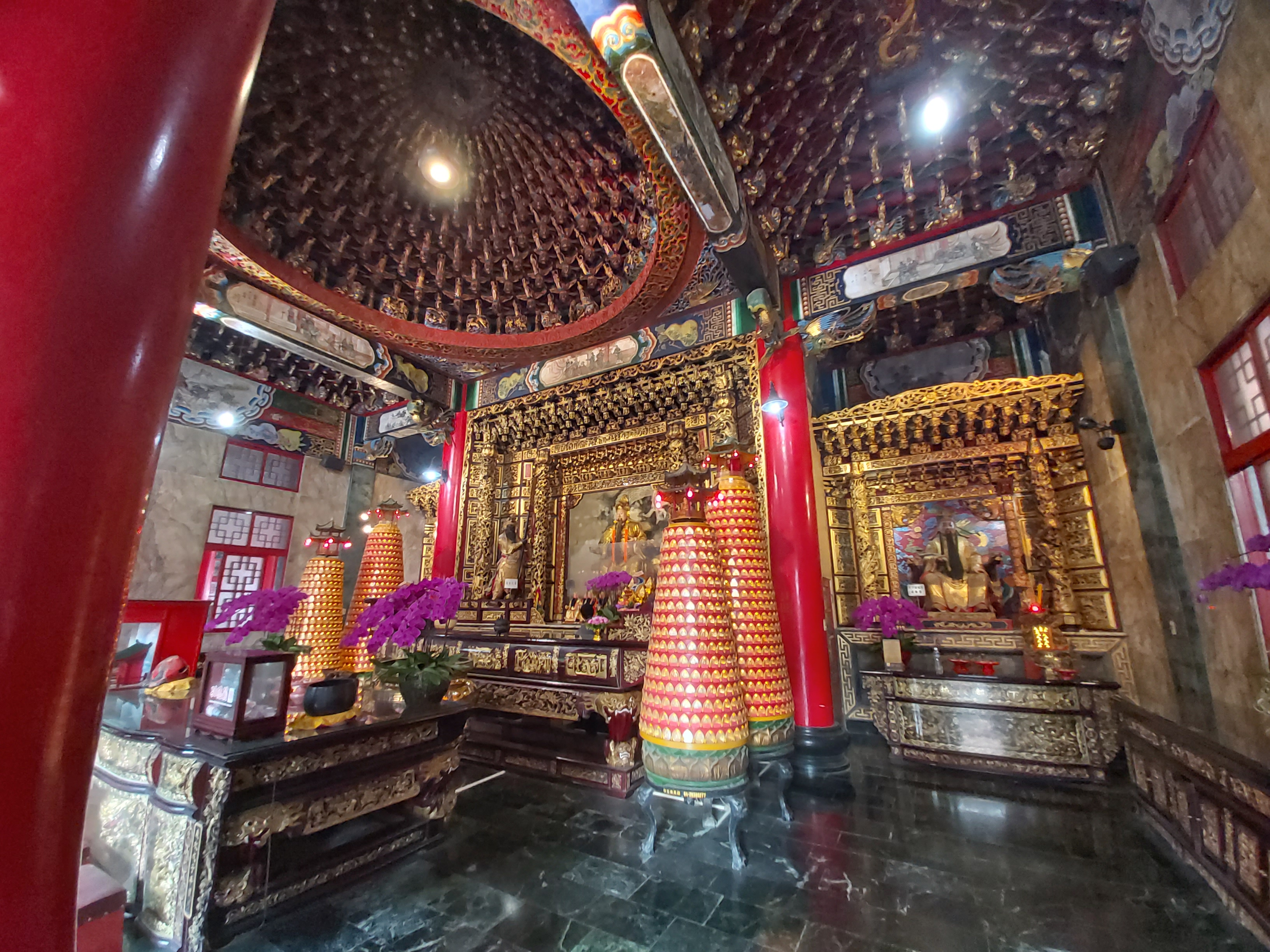
Statue of Martial God and City God (right)

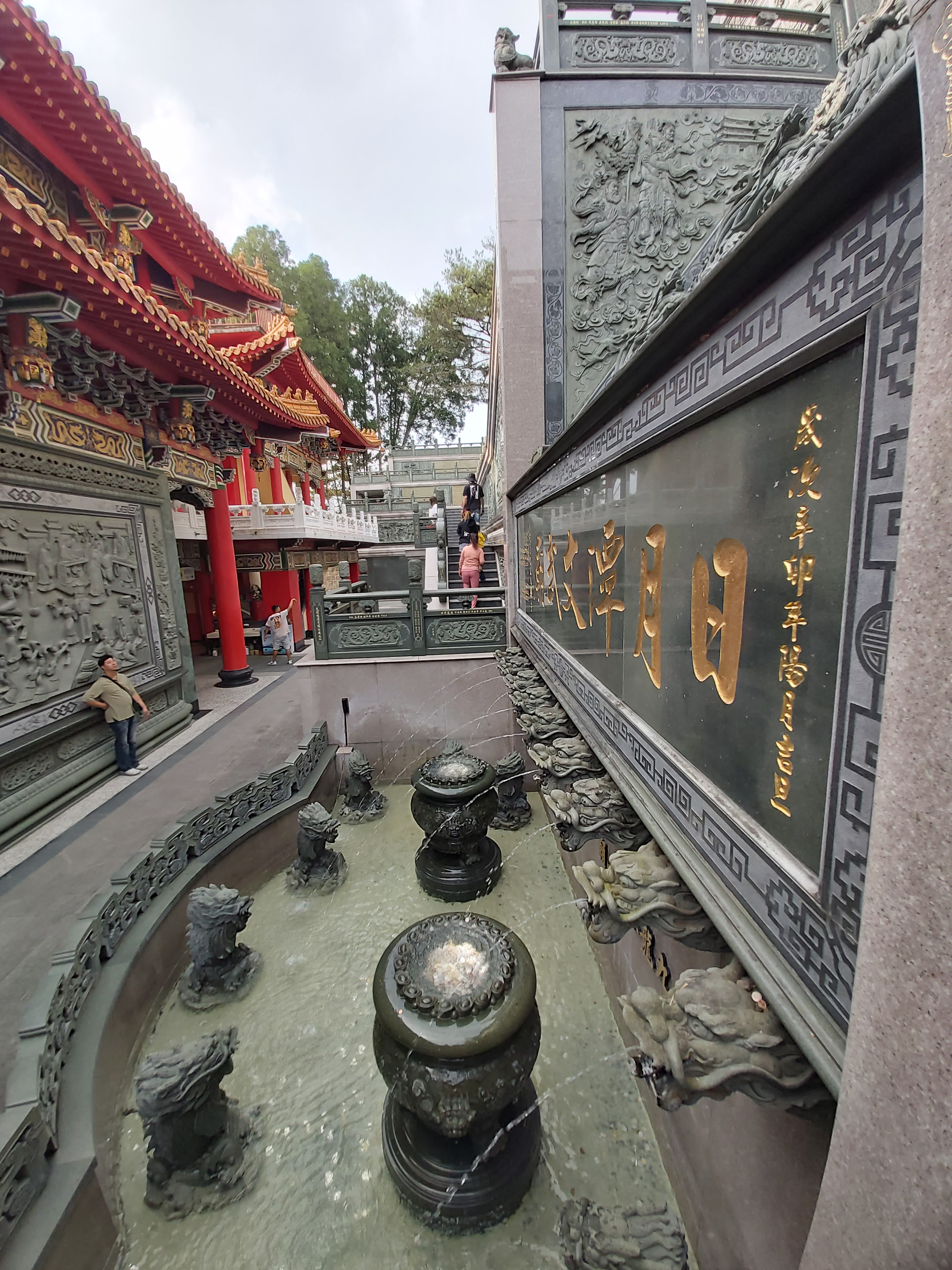
Wished pond

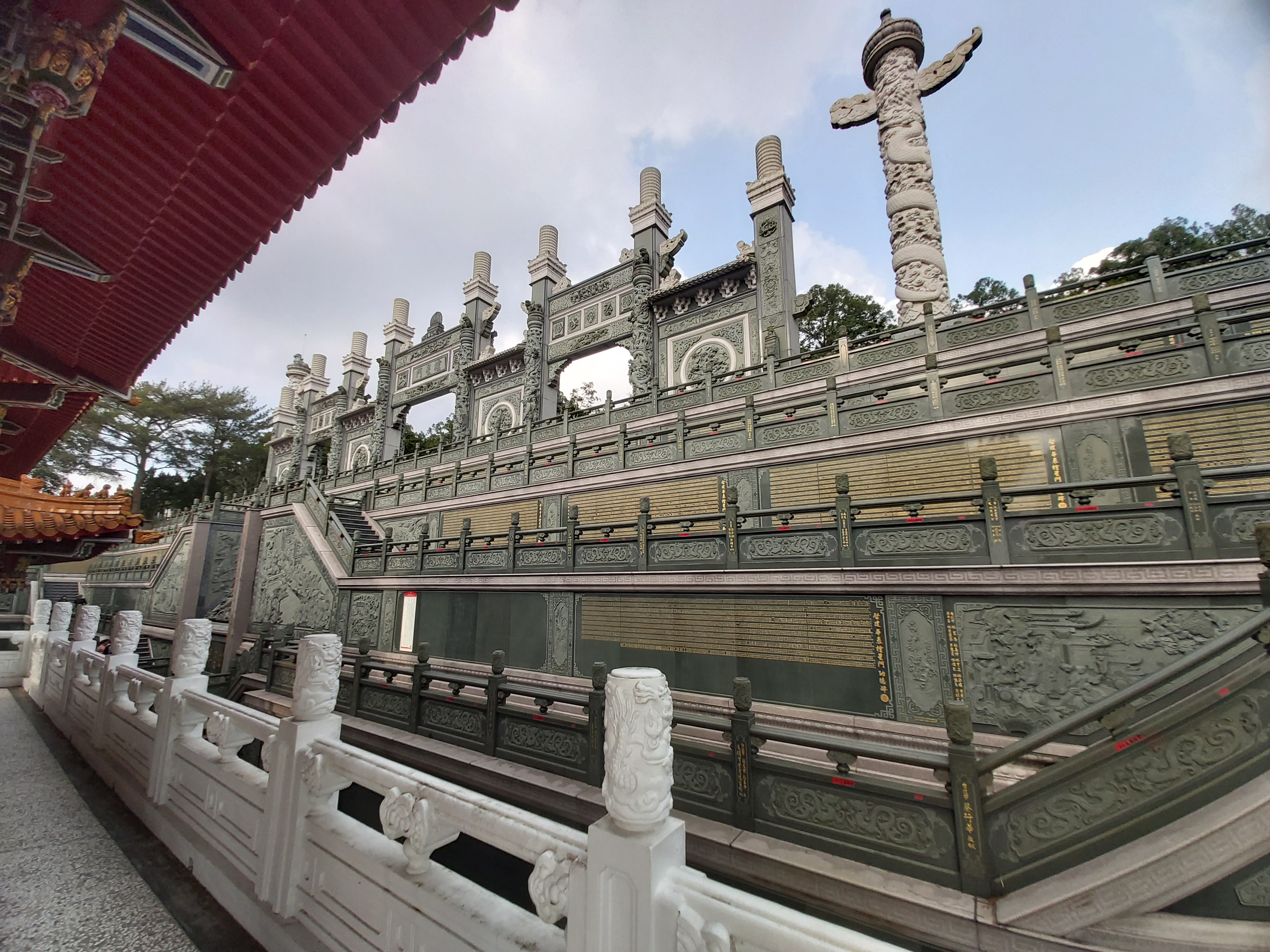
Lingxing Gate

== Transportation ==
The temple is accessible by bus from Taipei Railway Station, Taichung TRA station, or THSR Taichung Station.

== See also ==
- Martial temple
- Wen Wu temple
- Xuanzang Temple
- List of temples in Taiwan
- Religion in Taiwan

== Official website ==
- Official website (in Chinese)
