= Su Xuelin =

Chinese author and scholar

- 蘇雪林
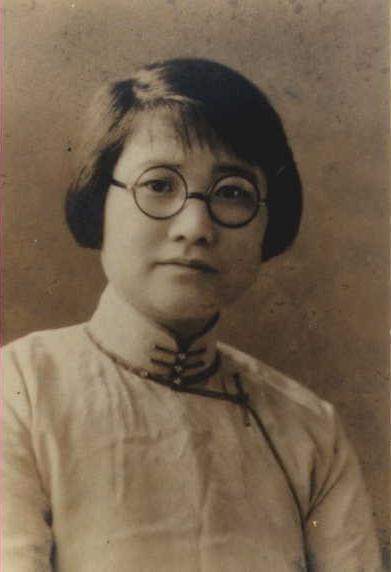
- Su Xuelin in 1933 in Wuhan
- Born: February 24, 1897; Rui'an, Zhejiang, China
- Died: April 21, 1999 (aged 102); Tainan, Taiwan
- Occupations: author, scholar
- Writing career
- Period: 1897-1999

Su Xuelin
- Traditional Chinese: 蘇雪林
- Simplified Chinese: 苏雪林
Transcriptions
Standard Mandarin
- Hanyu Pinyin: Sū Xuělín
- Wade–Giles: Su Hsüeh-lin

Su Xuelin or Su Hsüeh-lin (Chinese: 蘇雪林; 24 February 1897 – 21 April 1999) was a Chinese writer and scholar.

== Early life ==
Su Xuelin was born to a family of officials native to Anhui province in 1897. Her grandfather, Su Jinxin, served as a magistrate in several counties in Zhejiang province, where Su Xuelin was born. Her mother was surnamed Tu, but had no formal first name, instead going by the nickname To-Ni. Su's father held a minor official position, first under the Qing dynasty and then the Republic of China. Su had three brothers and two sisters.

== Education and career ==
Su studied in Anhui, and later Beijing under the supervision of Hu Shih. During the May Fourth Movement, she penned an essay Green Skies and a novel Thorny Heart which won critical acclaim. In 1922 she went to France and returned to China in 1925. Then she taught at Soochow University and Wuhan University.

Su was an opponent of Lu Xun, a contemporary Chinese writer, and wrote to Cai Yuanpei to dissuade him from serving as the chairman of the committee to prepare Lu's funeral after Lu died in 1936. This provoked anger from the leftists in China who vociferously castigated Su. In 1949, when the Chinese Communist Party overthrew the republic, she moved to Hong Kong, where she was offered a position as an editor and translator by the Catholic Church in Hong Kong. However, Su was not able to find materials for her research in Hong Kong, so she left for Europe a year later, still supported by the Catholic Church. After visiting Vatican City, she went to France. While there, she took courses at the Collège de France, where she was influenced by Édouard Paul Dhorme, Paul Demiéville, and Georges Dumézil. However, Su found that French sinology was irrelevant to her scholarship, and left France after only two years. Around the period she shifted her research concentration on ancient texts, such as those written by Qu Yuan and of Greek and Roman mythology.

From 1952 Su taught in Taiwan, at National Taiwan Normal University and National Cheng Kung University. She retired in 1973 and was awarded the first title of Honorary Professor at Cheng Kung University.

== Personal life ==
Su converted to Roman Catholicism in 1924. In her autobiography Fu Sheng Jiu SI, Su stated that she was a descendant of Su Zhe, a renowned poet of the Song dynasty.
