= Dongpo, Meishan =

Dongpo 东坡区
- District
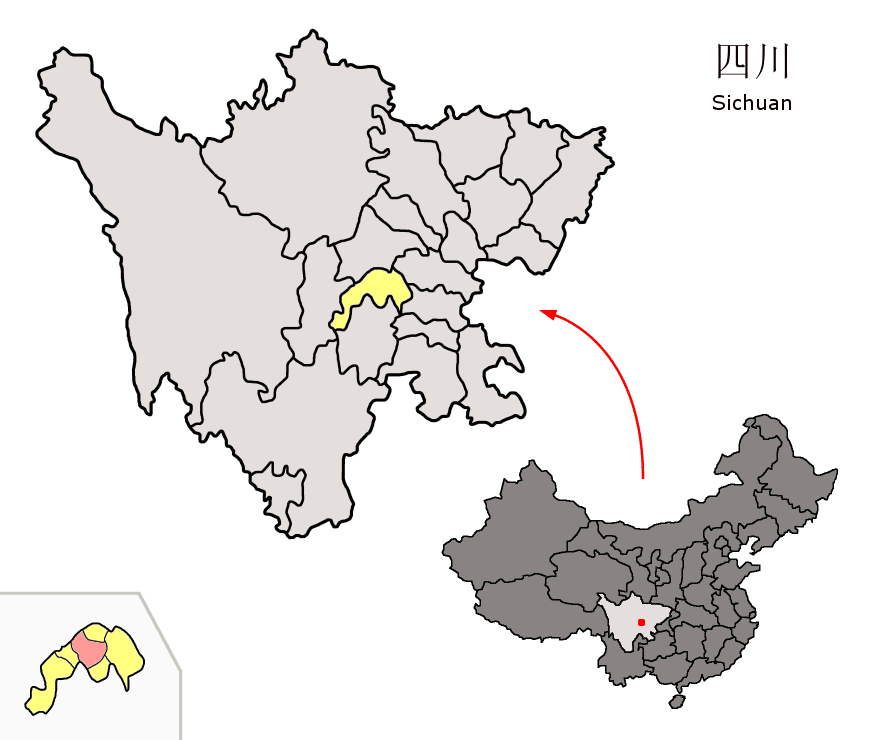

- Location in Sichuan
- Coordinates: 30.0412°N 103.828°E
- Country: China
- Province: Sichuan
- Prefecture-level city: Meishan
- District seat: Chongli Town

Area
  - Total: 1,331 km^{2} (514 sq mi)

Population (2020 census)
  - Total: 904,412
  - Density: 679.5/km^{2} (1,760/sq mi)
- Time zone: UTC+8 (China Standard)
- Website: www.dp.gov.cn

Dongpo District (simplified Chinese: 东坡区; traditional Chinese: 東坡區; pinyin: Dōngpō Qū) is a district of the city of Meishan, Sichuan Province, China. It is named after the Song Dynasty scholar and poet Su Dongpo, who was born there.

== Administrative divisions ==
Dongpo District administers 3 subdistricts and 13 towns:

- Tonghui Subdistrict (通惠街道)
- Dashiqiao Subdistrict (大石桥街道)
- Suci Subdistrict (苏祠街道)
- Taihe Town (太和镇)
- Shangyi Town (尚义镇)
- Duoyue Town (多悦镇)
- Qinjia Town (秦家镇)
- Wansheng Town (万胜镇)
- Simeng Town (思蒙镇)
- Xiuwen Town (修文镇)
- Songjiang Town (松江镇)
- Chongli Town (崇礼镇)
- Funiu Town (富牛镇)
- Yongshou Town (永寿镇)
- Sansu Town (三苏镇)
- Fuxing Town (复兴镇)
