= Wen and wu =

Concepts in Chinese philosophy

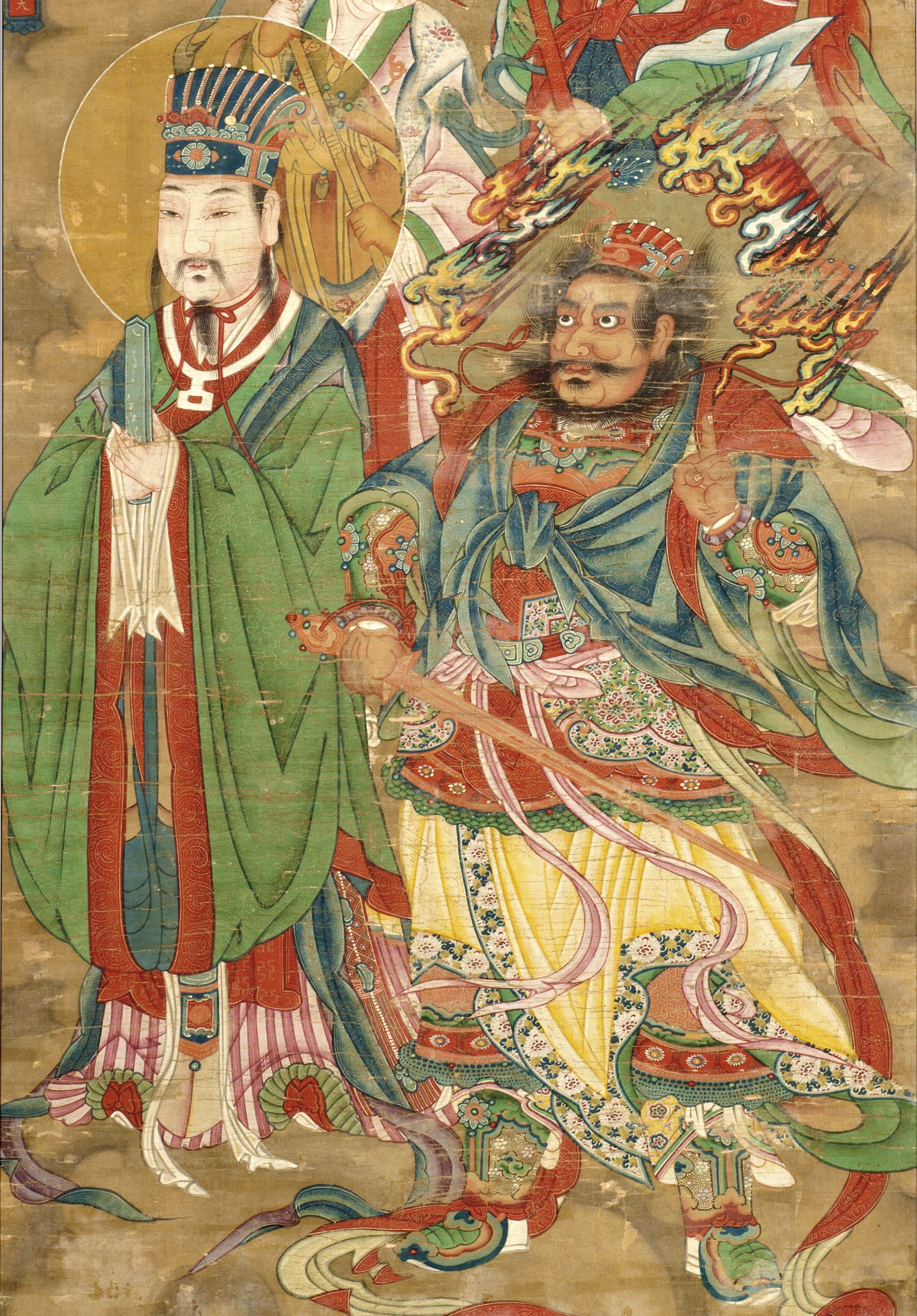
Shuilu ritual painting depicting a divine civil official and thunder god in military regalia.

Wén (Chinese: 文) and wǔ (Chinese: 武) are a conceptual pair in Chinese philosophy and political culture describing opposition and complementarity of civil and military realms of government. Differentiation between wen and wu was engaged in discussions on criminal punishment, administrative control, creation and reproduction of social order, education and moral transformation.

The concept was formed during the Spring and Autumn and Warring States periods, and best articulated in the 3rd or 2nd century BCE. However, until recently it was not much discussed by the Western scholars because of their inaccurate perception of the importance of Confucianism in the pre-imperial and early imperial era, and their understanding of Confucianism as pacifist in its nature. An example of the last is provided by John K. Fairbank: “Warfare was disesteemed in Confucianism... The resort to warfare (wu) was an admission of bankruptcy in the pursuit of wen [civility or culture]. Consequently, it should be a last resort... Herein lies the pacifist bias of the Chinese tradition... Expansion through wen... was natural and proper; whereas expansion by wu, brute force and conquest, was never to be condoned.”

== History of the terms ==
Attested in Shang dynasty oracle bones, the earliest uses were in the posthumous epithets of certain Shang ancestors, the first recorded – conveniently, for both – being Wen Wu Ding. The most common use case of wen in the epigraphic record is in appellations to dead ancestors, where it shared semantic space of general positive eulogy with precisely the words huáng (皇) and liè (烈). Any bases for why one was selected over another are not apparent.

The posthumous names of the Zhou dynasty (1046–256 BCE) founders, King Wen and King Wu, represent the two terms as standing in the "father-and-son" relationship. Wen and Wu became the most popular posthumous names of regional lords during the Zhou dynasty, but Wen in particular saw no usage until nearly the end of the Western Zhou, when central power was significantly weakened, suggesting the possibility of royal exclusivity akin to a ritual trademark.

The first archaeologically attested use of wen and wu as common terms outside of posthumous epithets or as synecdoche for the Zhou founders dates to the Spring and Autumn period, where a ruler of the state of Qin used them to describe some of his positive qualities while asserting his assidiousness in acting as a responsible lineage head. In the transmitted literature, the terms occur at the earliest strata of the earliest texts, the Shijing and the Shangshu, but the precise meaning of wen in particular is indeterminate from context.

Shuoyuan, compiled by Liu Xiang (77–6 BCE, Han dynasty), gives a classical example of the terms' balancing against each other:

King Cheng enfeoffed Bo Qin [the Duke of Zhou's son] as the Duke of Lu. Summoning him, he addressed him, saying: "Do you know the Way of acting as the ruler over the people? ... Should you possess wen but lack wu, you will have no means to awe those below. Should you possess wu but lack wen, the people will fear you but not draw close. If wen and wu are implemented together, then your awe-inspiring virtue will be achieved."

== See also ==
- Wen Wu temple
- Soil and grain
