= Su Xun =

Song dynasty writer (1009–1066)

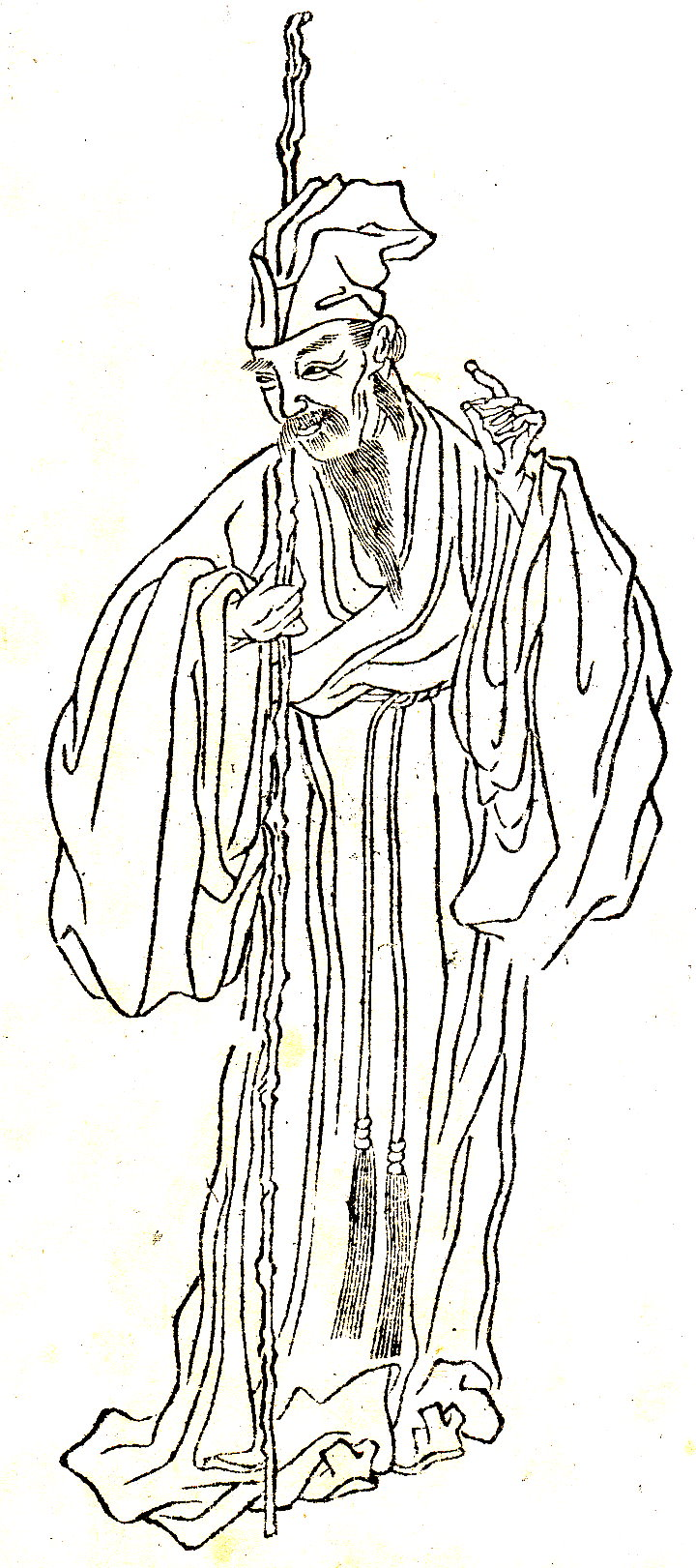

Su Xun (Chinese: 蘇洵; 22 May 1009 – 21 May 1066) was a scholar, essayist and philosopher during the Song dynasty, listed as one of the Eight Masters of the Tang and Song, along with his sons Su Shi and Su Zhe.

== Life and career ==
=== Early life and education ===
Su Xun was born to an affluent family at Meishan, Sichuan Province. He began to diligently study at the age of 27 towards the civil service examination, which was considered too late by public at that time. He attempted the examinations for the Jinshi and Maocai (Xiucai) qualifications several times but failed all. At age 37, he shifted away from examination style writings emphasizing on rhythm and rigid formality, and embarked on over a decade of intensive study of classical literature and philosophy from the pre-Qin era including the Confucius and Mencius texts. Through self-teaching, Su Xun acquired a thorough understanding of classic scholarly discourses as well as historical events. He became capable of in-depth philosophical and political argument through essay writing. During his learning years, he simultaneously coached and guided his two sons in their study of history, literature, and philosophy, who would later grow to significant literati in the Song Dynasty.

=== Career and accomplishments ===
In 1056, Su Xun, at age 47, accompanied by his sons Su Shi and Su Zhe, went to the capital Bianjing, to meet the Hanlin academician Ouyang Xiu. He presented twenty-two essays to Ouyang Xiu containing his recommendation and insights on political, economical and military reforms. Ouyang highly appreciated his literary style, comparing it to that of ancient Confucian philosopher Xunzi. His fame flourished as scholars and officials in the capital eagerly read and emulated his writings.

In 1057, both of his sons passed the imperial examination with high scores, causing a sensation in the capital. However, their joy was short-lived due to the passing of Su Xun's wife, Lady Cheng. The news brought profound grief to the family. In 1058, Emperor Renzong of Song summoned him for an examination, but Su Xun excused himself due to poor health conditions.

Unlike his sons Su Shi and Su Zhe, Su Xun remained under-accomplished in his political career, due to absence of official qualifications. Nonetheless, through diligent self-teaching, he has established himself as a master of prose writing and political philosopher. Zeng Gong remarked in his "Eulogy for Su Xun" (苏明允哀词）that Su Xun's prose balances grandeur with clarity, skillfully employs metaphors and analogies, and makes the abstract concept tangible, and distant ideas immediate. Contemporary scholar Wang Shuizhao compares Su Xun's writing style to that of Zhan Guo Ce for its abundance in rhetoric and persuasive discourse. Unlike the pre-Qin diplomats who often argued for the sake of argument, Su Xun’s political and historical commentaries were intended to analyze, critique, and address the challenges of his time and the empire. Su's diction was both concise and powerful; he was meticulous in his word selection and assertive in presenting his thoughts and arguments.

One of Su Xun's short essay "The naming of the two sons" (名二子说) was well known not only for its crisp language, but also for its foresight and wisdom. The essay was written when his elder son, Su Shi, was eleven, and his younger son, Su Zhe, was eight. Su Xun accurately identified and predicted the circumstances of his sons, weaving his wishes and advice into the names. By naming the elder "Shi" (轼) meaning the less noticeable railing of a chariot, he hoped that the talented and outspoken Su Shi would learn to restrain himself. Unfortunately, Su Shi did not fully heed his father’s counsel, and his conspicuous nature led him into a tumultuous career. By naming the younger one "Zhe" (辙), meaning ruts, the father captured the essence of Su Zhe's key traits - caution and low profile - which ensured him a stable career and a relatively peaceful life.
