= Su Zhe =

Chinese Song dynasty official and scholar

- 蘇轍
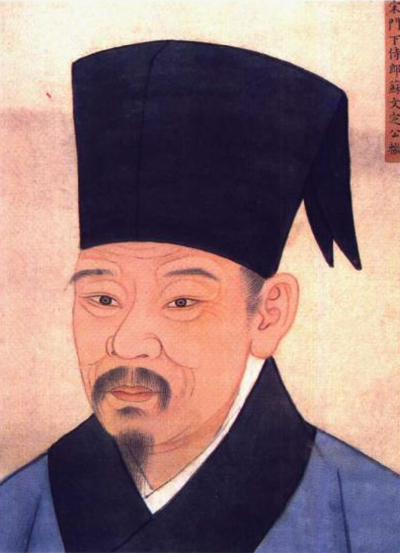

Personal details
- Born: 1039 Meishan, China
- Died: 1112 (aged 72–73)
- Parent: Su Xun (father)
- Relatives: Su Shi (brother)
- Occupation: Essayist, historian, poet, politician

Su Zhe (traditional Chinese: 蘇轍; simplified Chinese: 苏辙; 1039–1112), or Su Che, courtesy names Ziyou 子由 and Tongshu 同叔, was a Chinese essayist, historian, poet, and politician from Meishan, located in modern-day Sichuan Province, China.

Su was highly honored as a politician and essayist in the Song dynasty, together with his father Su Xun and his elder brother Su Shi. They were collectively recognized among "The Eight Great Men of Letters of the Tang and Song Dynasties". The Sansu temple, where the Su families resided, was rebuilt into the Sansu Museum in 1984, and has since become one of the most famous cultural attractions. Su Zhe left behind a substantial body of fine works. He died in 1112 at the age of 73.

== Life ==
Su Zhe was born on 20 February 1039 in Meishan, which now belongs to Sichuan Province. At the age of 18, he and his brother Su Shi passed the highest level civil service examination to attain the degree of jinshi, a prerequisite of high government office.

In 1070, Su Zhe wrote a letter to the emperor to point out that it was not wise to reform. And he also wrote to the chancellor Wang Anshi to criticize the new laws. Su Zhe's first remote trip of exile was to Junzhou, Shanxi Province. In 1079, his brother Su Shi wrote a poem just to criticise the chancellor Wang Anshi because he was often at odds with a political faction headed by Wang Anshi. However, his political opponents said that he was criticizing the emperor, so the government sent Su Shi to the prison and then had him exiled for political crimes (乌台诗案). Su Zhe respected his brother very much and the brothers had good relationship, so Su Zhe tried to save his brother from the prison and he hoped that he can use his official position in exchange for his brother's safety. But unfortunately, he was also involved in that case and was exiled to Junzhou.

Su Zhe settled in Yinchuan in 1104 and he enjoyed a peaceful life there without the stir of society. And then in 1112, he died. One of his descendants, Su Xuelin, was a famous essayist and novelist in modern China.

== Works ==
Su Zhe's works were heavily influenced by his brother, Su Shi, who was also a famous writer. Su Zhe's works were always reflecting Confucianism. He admired Mencius most but he also learned from many different people. Just like his father and his brother, Su Zhe could find out the main problem of that society and he would like to try to solve it from Predecessors' experience, which can reflect that Su Zhe was a patriotic writer.

"The most urgent thing nowadays is lack of money" (今世之患,莫急于無財) is what he wrote in 'Letter to emperor'. He wrote an article with the same name as his father's work 'On the Six Fallen States' (六 國 論. In his book' About Three Kingdoms', he compared Liu Bei with Liu Bang. And he thought that Liu Bei was lacking in wisdom and courage, and he didn't know he won for his lacking.

=== Prose essays ===
Su Zhe was good at writing political comments and historical essays. For example, he had written in book 'xinlun' (新论) ): "In today's society, good government does not necessarily lead to peace and chaos does not necessarily lead to lead to crisis. When the rules organizing things are inconsistently or incompletely applied, even if it doesn't end in a revolution there will be severe social problems."zh:苏辙 (當今天下之事, 治而不至于安, 亂而不至于危, 紀綱粗立而不舉, 無急變而有緩病.)

Concluding from all of his essays, the style of essay had always been changing. These changes followed his different period of life and we could divide it into four periods.

The essay before he worked on politics were penetrating like 'On the Six Fallen States' (六 國 論), vivid like 'About three Kingdoms' (三國論). When he became an official of local government, his essay gradually changed from making comments to expressing passions and not so cared about its structure. At that time, his passion was hidden and he could describe scenery and character vividly. When he went back to royal court, Su Zhe's essay was about some suggestions of political reform and his essay was made for its practical use from the point view of the expression). At his last period of life, his essay followed the main point idea of his reading and experience.

=== Qi ===
Su Zhe thought that works came from Qi, and we could not write works just by learning but we could also get Qi by developing. (文者, 气之所形.然文不可以学而能, 气可以养而致.) In his opinion, he considered Qi was the key point by which we could write great works. We could be close to it not only through the development inside but also as many experiences as possible. .

== Achievements ==
=== Achievements in politics ===
In 1057, when he was 17, Su Zhe and his brother Su Shi passed the civil service examinations to attain the degree of Jishi, a prerequisite for high government office.

In 1070, Su wrote a letter to the emperor saying that it was so ridiculous to change the law because it was immutable, which was aimed at criticizing Wang Anshi's reforms.

In 1072, Su was appointed as Tuiguan in Henan.

Throughout the following twenty years, Su experienced a really hard period in his position. During his demotion, Su Zhe traveled to Ruzhou, Yuanzhou, Huazhou, Leizhou and other places.

Finally in 1104, Su Zhe lived in a farm in Xuzhou and spent the last years enjoying the peaceful life there until he died in 1112.

=== Achievements in literature ===
Being an essayist, Su Zhe was especially skilled at Celun (策论), which led him had a special status in the Song dynasty. Compared with his brother Su Shi's talent, he was indeed weak in some aspects. However, according to what Su Shi had said about him, Su Zhe's accomplishments in essay did reach to a certain point that would never end. Except Celun, Su was also good at political comments and historical essays. For example, in his work"Letter To Emperor", he pointed out that the most important factor that caused the society in ferment was that people had been impoverished for such a long time (今世之患, 莫急于无财). Same as both of his father and his brother, all his historical essays were aimed at criticizing the social condition in order to attract the emperor's attention to build a better environment for further development.

Su Zhe excelled in the shi, ci and fu forms of poetry, and during his writing, he tried to catch up with his brother but only to achieve less satisfied result.

The two books of Su Zhe, "Chun Qiu Jie Ji" and "Shi Ji Zhuan" had made a significant innovation to the study of "The Book of Odes".
