= Martial temple =

Chinese temples centered on military figures or events

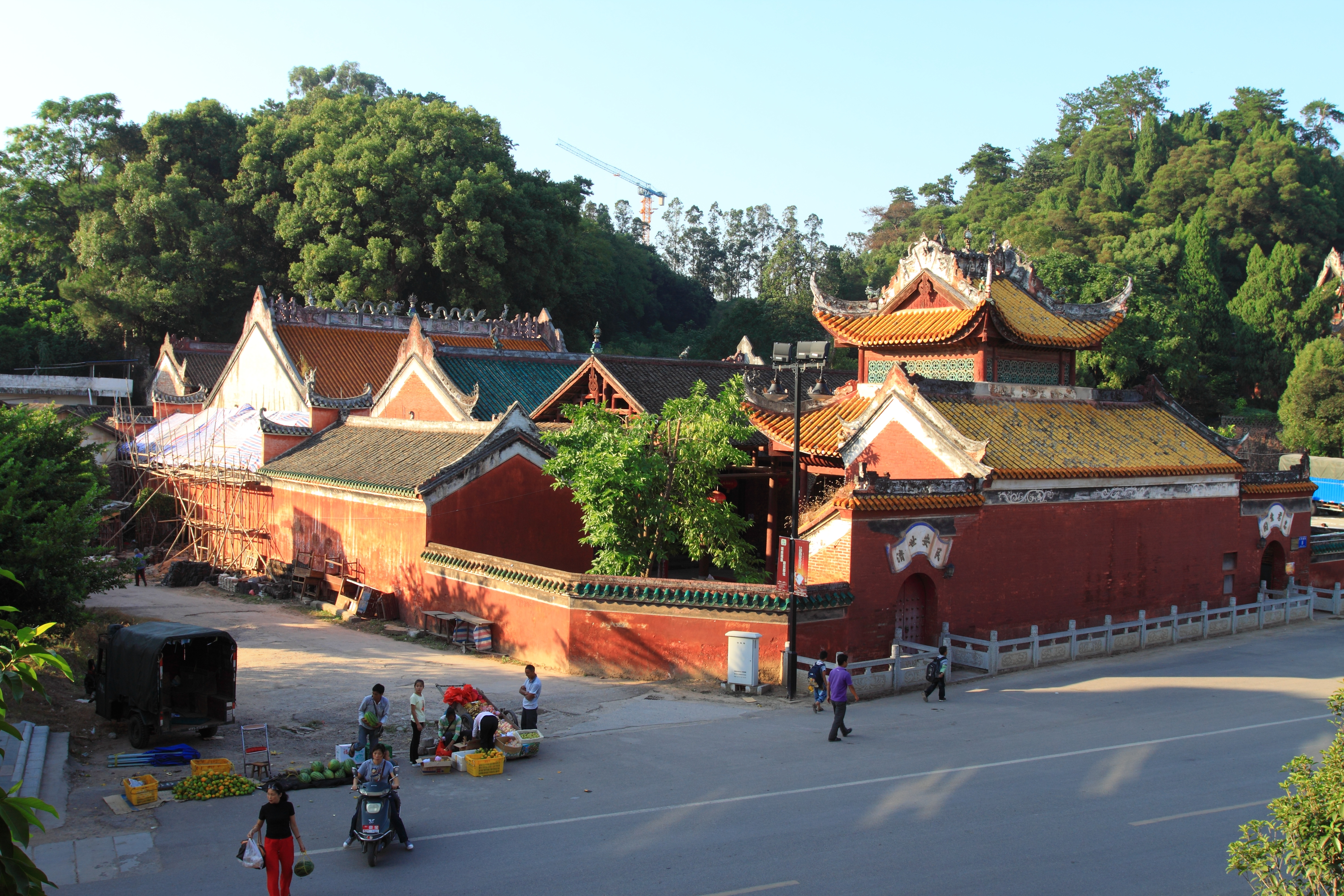
Gongcheng Wumiao

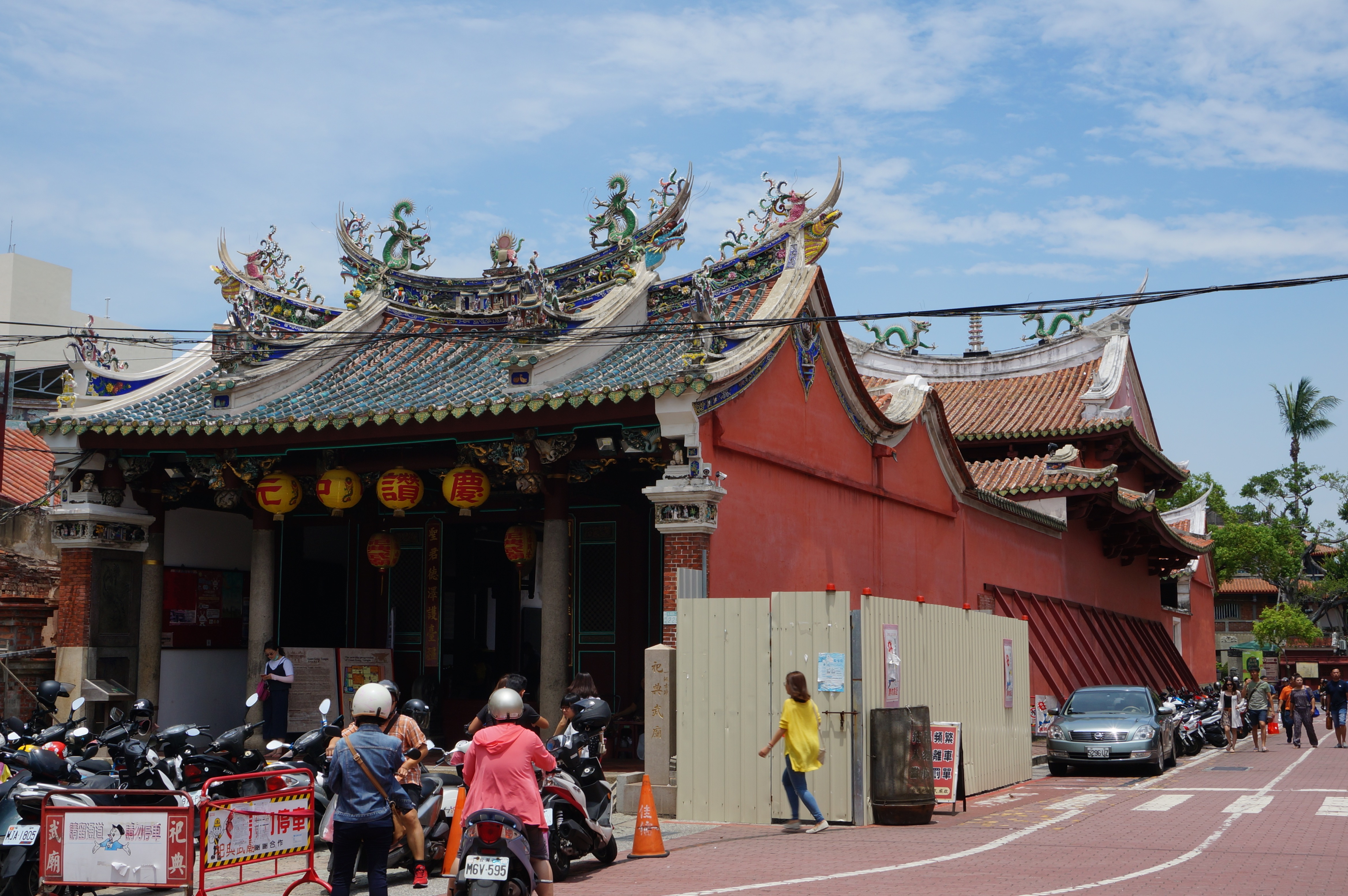
State Temple of the Martial God in Tainan, Taiwan

Martial temples (Chinese: 武庙; pinyin: wǔmiào), also translated as military temples or warrior temples, are Chinese temples dedicated to worshiping outstanding military leaders and strategists (excluding kings and emperors). They were often built by the governments as the counterpart of civil temples (wenmiao) or Temple of Confucius. Temples that worshiped both civil and military gods are called Wenwu temple (wenwumiao).

Martial temples originated from China in 731 AD, initially for worshiping 11 strategists, among whom Jiang Ziya was the dominant figure. The rest of the 10 strategists with comparatively inferior status were called Shizhe (十哲), which means "Ten Wise Men", among whom Zhang Liang had the highest status, only below Jiang Ziya. It was supposed to be worshipped in spring and autumn, and the formality would be similar to the worshiping of the Temple of Confucius.

The people being worshipped in the temple, however, changed in subsequent periods of history. In the Qing dynasty, Guan Yu (as Guandi or Wudi, the god of war) became the major god in the martial temples. Offerings may be made to Guandi on the 15th day or the second month and the 13th day of the fifth month of the lunar calendar. After the Republic of China established in 1912, the government promoted the joint worshiping of Guan Yu and Yue Fei, the latter was considered a national hero in defending Southern Song dynasty from the invasion of Jurchen Jin. 24 other strategists in history were also worshiped alongside Guan Yu and Yue Fei, but with lower status. After the People's Republic of China established in 1949, the communist government no longer officially promoted martial temples.

== See also ==
- State Temple of the Martial God
- Temple of Confucius
- Wen Wu temple
- Lord Guan temples in Hong Kong: Hip Tin Temples, Kwan Tai Temples, Man Mo Temples
