= Shangyi, Guangdong =

Shangyi 上义镇
- Town
- Location in Guangdong
- Coordinates: 23.2794°N 114.82466°E
- Country: People's Republic of China
- Province: Guangdong
- Prefecture-level city: Heyuan
- County: Zijin County
- Time zone: UTC+8 (China Standard)

Shangyi (Chinese: 上义; pinyin: Shàngyì) is a town under the administration of Zijin County, Heyuan, Guangdong, China. As of 2020, it administers one residential community and the following seven villages:

- Shangyi Village
- Guanghui Village (光辉村)
- Jidong Village (吉洞村)
- Zhaoyuan Village (招元村)
- Yexi Village (叶西村)
- Jiaotian Village (郊田村)
- Juanpeng Village (捲蓬村)
