= Meishan =

Meishan 眉山市
- Prefecture-level city
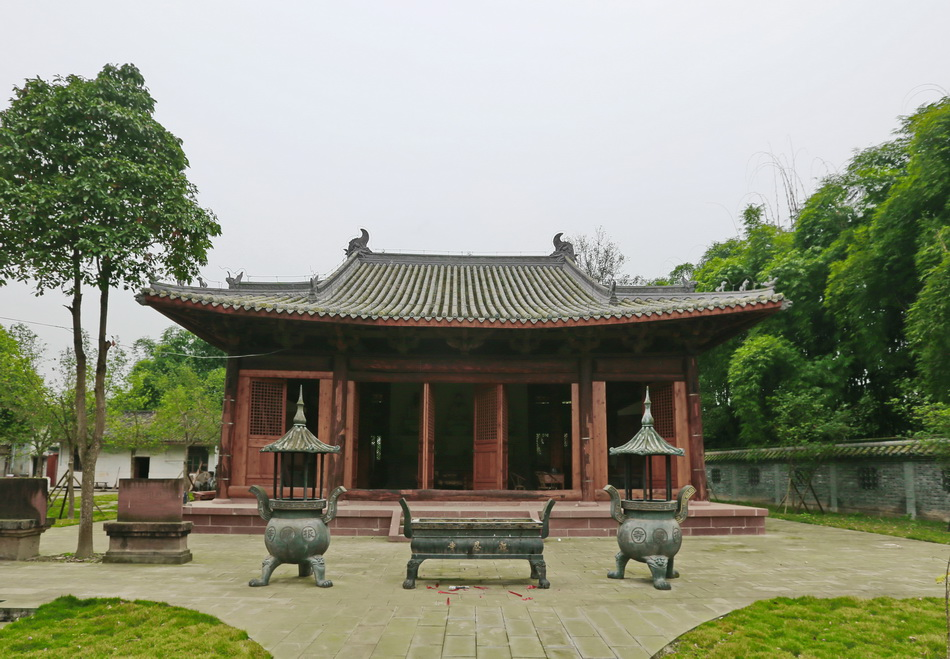
- Bao'en Temple, Meishan

- Location of Meishan in Sichuan

- Location of the city center in Sichuan Meishan (China)
- Coordinates (Meishan municipal government): 30°04′38″N 103°50′54″E
- Country: People's Republic of China
- Province: Sichuan
- Municipal seat: Dongpo District

Area
  - Prefecture-level city: 7,173.82 km^{2} (2,769.83 sq mi)
  - Urban: 1,796.1 km^{2} (693.5 sq mi)
  - Metro: 1,796.1 km^{2} (693.5 sq mi)

Population (2020 census)
  - Prefecture-level city: 2,955,219
  - Density: 411.945/km^{2} (1,066.93/sq mi)
  - Urban: 1,232,648
  - Urban density: 686.29/km^{2} (1,777.5/sq mi)
  - Metro: 1,232,648
  - Metro density: 686.29/km^{2} (1,777.5/sq mi)

GDP
  - Prefecture-level city: CN¥ 103.0 billion US$ 16.5 billion
  - Per capita: CN¥ 34,380; US$ 5,520
- Time zone: UTC+8 (China Standard)
- Postal code: 620000
- Area code: 028
- ISO 3166 code: CN-SC-14
- Website: www.ms.gov.cn

Meishan (Chinese: 眉山; Sichuanese Pinyin: Mi^{2}san^{1}; local pronunciation: [mi˨˩sã˥]; pinyin: Méishān; Wade–Giles: Mei-shan), formerly known as Meizhou (眉州) or Qingzhou (青州), is a prefecture-level city of Sichuan with 2,955,219 inhabitants as of the 2020 census, of whom 1,232,648 lived in the built-up (or metro) area made up of the two urban districts of Dongpo and Pengshan. Meishan is located in the southwest of Sichuan Basin.

== History ==
The history of Meishan – though it was not always known as such – can be traced back to the 4th century BC. In 316 BC, King Shenjing of Zhou established the county of Wuyang (武阳县) on what is now the Pengshan district of Meishan.

In the year 496, during the Southern Qi dynasty, Wuyang County, then under the commandery of Qianwei (犍为郡), was abolished. The region it occupied was used to establish Qitong Zuo Commandery (齐通左郡) and Qitong County (齐通县). The Qitong Zuo Commandery was renamed Qitong Commandery (齐通郡) in the year 548 during the Liang dynasty. In the same year, the prefecture of Qingzhou (青州) was established, which governed Qitong Commandery.

Following this, the prefecture of Qingzhou underwent a series of renames. It was firstly renamed Meizhou (眉州) in 553 during the Western Wei dynasty, then Qingzhou (again) and subsequently Jiazhou (嘉州) in 572 and 579 respectively during the Northern Zhou dynasty. Finally, during the Sui dynasty in 606, the prefecture was renamed Meizhou, with Tongyi County (通义县) as its capital. Later, Meizhou prefecture was abolished and replaced by Meishan Commandery (眉山郡), its capital Longyou (龙游), now located in the Shizhong District of Leshan City.

In the year 618 of the Tang dynasty, the Meishan Commandery was renamed Jiazhou. The next year, several counties split from Jiazhou, merging together to re-establish Meizhou Prefecture. Meizhou Prefecture now administered five counties: Danleng (丹棱县), Hongya (洪雅县), Qingshen (青神县), Nan'an (南安县) (now Jiajiang County) and its capital, Tongyi (通义县). Some decades later in 742, Meizhou Prefecture was abolished while Tongyi Commandery (通义郡) was established. This was reverted 16 years later in 758 – Tongyi Commandery was abolished, while Meizhou Prefecture was restored.

During the Song dynasty, in 976, Tongyi County, capital of Meizhou Prefecture, was renamed Meishan County (眉山县). During the Ming dynasty, in 1376, Meizhou Prefecture was downgraded to Meixian County (眉县). The next year, the counties of Pengshan and Danleng were merged into Meixian, while Qingshen County merged with neighbouring Jiazhou Prefecture. Three years later, Meixian was re-elected as Meizhou prefecture, directly under the jurisdiction of the Sichuan Provincial Administration Commissioner's Office. Meishan County remained under the jurisdiction of Meizhou Prefecture, with jurisdiction over three counties: Danleng, Pengshan, and Qingshen.

In 1912 under the Republic of China, Meishan County was restored while Meizhou Prefecture was abolished. In January 1950, the Meishan Special Zone was established, containing Meishan County along with 9 other counties. In March 1953, the Meishan Special Zone was removed, putting Meishan County under the jurisdiction of the Leshan Special Zone. On May 30, 1997, the Meishan Prefecture was established upon approval of the state council, containing 6 counties including Meishan County. On 10 June 2000, Meishan Prefecture was renamed Meishan City (眉山市) and Meishan County was renamed Dongpo District.

== Administrative subdivisions ==
It has 2 county-level district and 4 counties.

Map
Name	Hanzi	Hanyu Pinyin	Population (2010)	Area (km^{2})	Density (/km^{2})
Dongpo District	东坡区	Dōngpō Qū	840,909	1,331	632
Pengshan District	彭山区	Péngshān Qū	329,777	465	709
Renshou County	仁寿县	Rénshòu Xiàn	1,571,112	2,606	603
Hongya County	洪雅县	Hóngyǎ Xiàn	343,321	1,896	181
Danling County	丹棱县	Dānlíng Xiàn	163,032	449	363
Qingshen County	青神县	Qīngshén Xiàn	197,029	387	509

== Notable people ==
- Su Shi, Song dynasty writer and poet (1037–1101), was a native of Meishan. A historic temple commemorating him and his father and brother, also notable writers (the "three Su") is located in the city.
- Yuan Chiung-chiung, Taiwanese author whose family originated in the area
- Chen Wenqing, former Minister of State Security

== Climate ==
Climate data for Meishan, elevation 415 m (1,362 ft), (1991–2020 normals, extremes 1981–present)
Month	Jan	Feb	Mar	Apr	May	Jun	Jul	Aug	Sep	Oct	Nov	Dec	Year
Record high °C (°F)	19.4 (66.9)	24.1 (75.4)	32.1 (89.8)	36.4 (97.5)	37.7 (99.9)	38.1 (100.6)	39.9 (103.8)	41.6 (106.9)	36.6 (97.9)	32.4 (90.3)	26.1 (79.0)	19.0 (66.2)	41.6 (106.9)
Mean daily maximum °C (°F)	10.3 (50.5)	13.3 (55.9)	18.5 (65.3)	24.0 (75.2)	27.6 (81.7)	29.5 (85.1)	31.4 (88.5)	31.2 (88.2)	26.8 (80.2)	21.8 (71.2)	17.1 (62.8)	11.6 (52.9)	21.9 (71.5)
Daily mean °C (°F)	6.8 (44.2)	9.3 (48.7)	13.7 (56.7)	18.7 (65.7)	22.5 (72.5)	24.9 (76.8)	26.6 (79.9)	26.3 (79.3)	22.8 (73.0)	18.3 (64.9)	13.6 (56.5)	8.3 (46.9)	17.7 (63.8)
Mean daily minimum °C (°F)	4.4 (39.9)	6.5 (43.7)	10.3 (50.5)	14.7 (58.5)	18.7 (65.7)	21.5 (70.7)	23.3 (73.9)	22.9 (73.2)	20.2 (68.4)	16.1 (61.0)	11.2 (52.2)	6.0 (42.8)	14.7 (58.4)
Record low °C (°F)	−3.6 (25.5)	−1.7 (28.9)	−0.5 (31.1)	5.5 (41.9)	8.5 (47.3)	14.8 (58.6)	16.7 (62.1)	17.0 (62.6)	13.7 (56.7)	5.3 (41.5)	0.9 (33.6)	−3.2 (26.2)	−3.6 (25.5)
Average precipitation mm (inches)	10.9 (0.43)	15.6 (0.61)	29.1 (1.15)	56.1 (2.21)	90.9 (3.58)	137.2 (5.40)	212.2 (8.35)	255.1 (10.04)	126.8 (4.99)	49.9 (1.96)	17.2 (0.68)	9.3 (0.37)	1,010.3 (39.77)
Average precipitation days (≥ 0.1 mm)	8.3	8.9	11.3	13.0	14.8	15.2	16.0	15.0	15.3	14.6	8.4	7.4	148.2
Average snowy days	0.5	0.3	0	0	0	0	0	0	0	0	0	0.3	1.1
Average relative humidity (%)	83	79	75	74	72	78	81	81	83	83	82	83	80
Mean monthly sunshine hours	29.6	48.6	87.1	118.9	122.9	112.6	132.7	142.3	74.2	54.1	48.9	34.4	1,006.3
Percentage possible sunshine	9	15	23	31	29	27	31	35	20	15	16	11	22
Source: China Meteorological Administration all-time extreme temperature all-time January highall-time July high
