= Su Shi =

Chinese writer and politician (1037–1101)

- 蘇軾
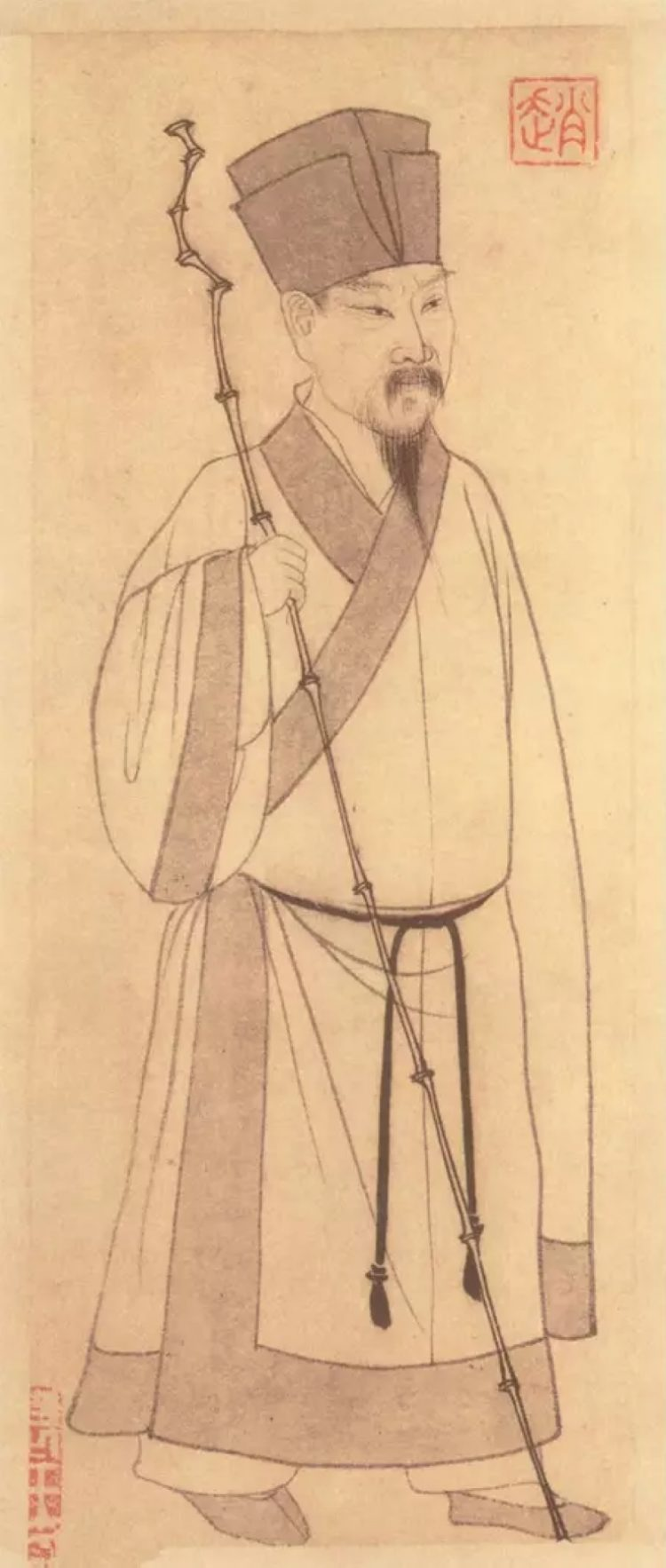
- Posthumous Yuan dynasty portrait of Su Shi by Zhao Mengfu

Minister of Rites
- In office 1092–1093

Minister of War
- In office 1092–1093

Personal details
- Born: 8 January 1037 Meizhou, Chengdu Fu Circuit, Song dynasty
- Died: 24 August 1101 (aged 64) Changzhou, Liangzhe Circuit, Song dynasty
- Relations: Su Zhe (brother)
- Parent: Su Xun (father)
- Notable works: Former and Latter Odes on the Red Cliffs (赤壁賦); The Cold Food Observance (寒食帖)

Chinese name
- Traditional Chinese: 蘇軾
- Simplified Chinese: 苏轼
Transcriptions
Standard Mandarin
- Hanyu Pinyin: Sū Shì
- Bopomofo: ㄙㄨ ㄕˋ
- Gwoyeu Romatzyh: Su Shyh
- Wade–Giles: Su^{1} Shih^{4}
- IPA: [sú ʂɻ̩̂]
Wu
- Suzhounese: Sou^{1} Seq^{7}
Yue: Cantonese
- Yale Romanization: Sōu Sīk
- Jyutping: Sou^{1} Sik^{1}
- IPA: [sɔw˥ sɪk̚˥]
Southern Min
- Hokkien POJ: So͘ Sek
- Tâi-lô: Soo Sik
Middle Chinese
- Middle Chinese: Su Śik

Su Shi (Chinese: 蘇軾; 8 January 1037 – 24 August 1101), courtesy name Zizhan (子瞻), art name Householder Dongpo (東坡居士), was a Chinese literatus, scholar-official, poet, writer, calligrapher, painter and gastronomist of the Song dynasty. Born into a prominent literary family in Meizhou, he was the son of Su Xun and brother of Su Zhe. Despite ambitions for high office, he became a repeated target in factional struggles between reformers and conservatives at the court, and he spent much of his career in exile, periods during which his literary output flourished.

A towering figure in Chinese literature and arts, Su left a prolific body of work that exerted enduring influence across the Sinosphere. His prose, ranging from philosophical to technical to culinary, earned him a place among the Eight Masters of the Tang and Song. His poetry is marked by vitality and boldness. In calligraphy he is counted among the Four Masters of Song Calligraphy. As a painter he was known for bamboo and weathered rocks, championing the capture of spirit over outward likeness.

== Early life and education ==
Su Shi was born in Meishan, near Mount Emei in Sichuan province. His given name Shi (軾) refers to the crossbar railing at the front of a chariot. His father Su Xun remarked that the railing, despite being an essential component in the carriage, appears low profile and unassuming. He hoped that the talented and outspoken Su Shi would learn self-restraint. Unfortunately, Su Shi did not fully heed his father’s counsel, and his conspicuous nature led him into a tumultuous career.

Su Shi's early education was conducted under a Daoist priest at a local village school. When he reached the age of 10, his education transitioned to homeschooling, initially guided by his mother, Lady Cheng, and subsequently by his father, Su Xun. Over the course of more than a decade, Su Xun dedicated himself to comprehensive studies of classical literature, philosophy, and historical texts, while providing coaching to his two adolescent sons as they prepared for the imperial examination.

Su Shi married at the age of 17. Su Shi and his younger brother Su Zhe maintained a close relationship since their childhood.

== Official career ==
=== Initial success and fame ===
In 1057, at the age of 19, Su Shi and his younger brother Su Zhe both passed the highest-level civil service examinations and attained the degree of jinshi, a prerequisite for high government office. His accomplishments at such a young age attracted the attention of Emperor Renzong and leading literary figure Ouyang Xiu, who became Su's patron thereafter. Ouyang had already been known as an admirer of Su Shi's father Su Xun, endorsing his literary style at the imperial court and stating that no other pleased him more. When the 1057 jinshi examinations were given, Ouyang Xiu unexpectedly required candidates to write in the ancient prose style when answering questions on the Confucian classics. The Su brothers gained high honors for what were deemed impeccable answers and achieved celebrity status, particularly due to Su Shi's exceptional performance in the subsequent 1061 decree examinations.

=== Provincial posts ===
Beginning in 1060 and throughout the following twenty years, Su Shi held a variety of government positions throughout China; most notably in Hangzhou, where he was responsible for constructing a pedestrian causeway across the West Lake that still bears the name Sudi (蘇堤, 'Su causeway'). He had served as a magistrate in the Mi Prefecture, which is located in modern-day Zhucheng County in Shandong. Later, when he was governor of Xuzhou, he wrote a memorial to the throne in 1078 complaining about the troubling economic conditions and potential for armed rebellion in Liguo Industrial Prefecture, where a large part of the Chinese iron industry was located.

=== Political exiles ===
Su Shi was often at odds with the political faction headed by Wang Anshi. Su Shi once wrote a poem criticizing Wang Anshi's reforms, especially the government monopoly imposed on the salt industry. The dominance of the reformist faction at court allowed the New Policy Group greater ability to have Su Shi exiled for political crimes. The claim was that Su Shi was criticizing the emperor, when in fact his poetry was aimed at criticizing Wang's reforms. Wang Anshi played no part in this action against Su, for he had retired from public life in 1076 and established a cordial relationship with Su Shi. Su Shi's first remote trip of exile (1080–1086) was to Huangzhou, Hubei. This post carried a nominal title, but no stipend, leaving Su in poverty. During this period, he began practicing Buddhist meditation. With help from a friend, Su built a small residence on a parcel of land in 1081. Su Shi lived at a farm called Dongpo ('Eastern Slope'), from which he took his literary pseudonym. While banished to Hubei province, he grew fond of the area he lived in; many of the poems considered his best were written in this period. His most famous piece of calligraphy, Han Shi Tie, was also written there. In 1086, Su Shi and all other banished statesmen were recalled to the capital due to the ascension of a new government. However, Su was banished a second time (1094–1100) to Huizhou and Danzhou, Hainan. In 1098 the Dongpo Academy in Hainan was built on the site of the residence that he lived in while in exile.

Although political bickering and opposition usually split ministers of court into rivaling groups, there were moments of non-partisanship and cooperation from both sides. For example, although the prominent scientist and statesman Shen Kuo (1031–1095) was one of Wang Anshi's most trusted associates and political allies, Shen nonetheless befriended Su Shi. Su Shi was aware that it was Shen Kuo who, as regional inspector of Zhejiang, presented Su Shi's poetry to the court sometime during 1073–1075 with concern that it expressed abusive and hateful sentiments against the Song court. It was these poetry pieces that Li Ding and Shu Dan later utilized in order to instigate a law case against Su Shi, although until that point Su Shi did not think much of Shen Kuo's actions in bringing the poetry to light.

=== The final years ===
In 1100, Su received a pardon and was posted to Chengdu, after a long period of political exile. However, he died in Changzhou, Jiangsu after his period of exile while en route to his new assignment in the year 1101. Su Shi was 64 years old. After his death he gained even greater popularity, as people sought to collect his calligraphy, depicted him in paintings, marked his visit to numerous places with stone inscriptions and built shrines in his honor. He was also depicted in artwork made posthumously, such as in Li Song's (1190–1225) painting of Su traveling in a boat, known as Su Dongpo at Red Cliff, after Su Song's poem written about the 3rd-century battle.

== Family ==
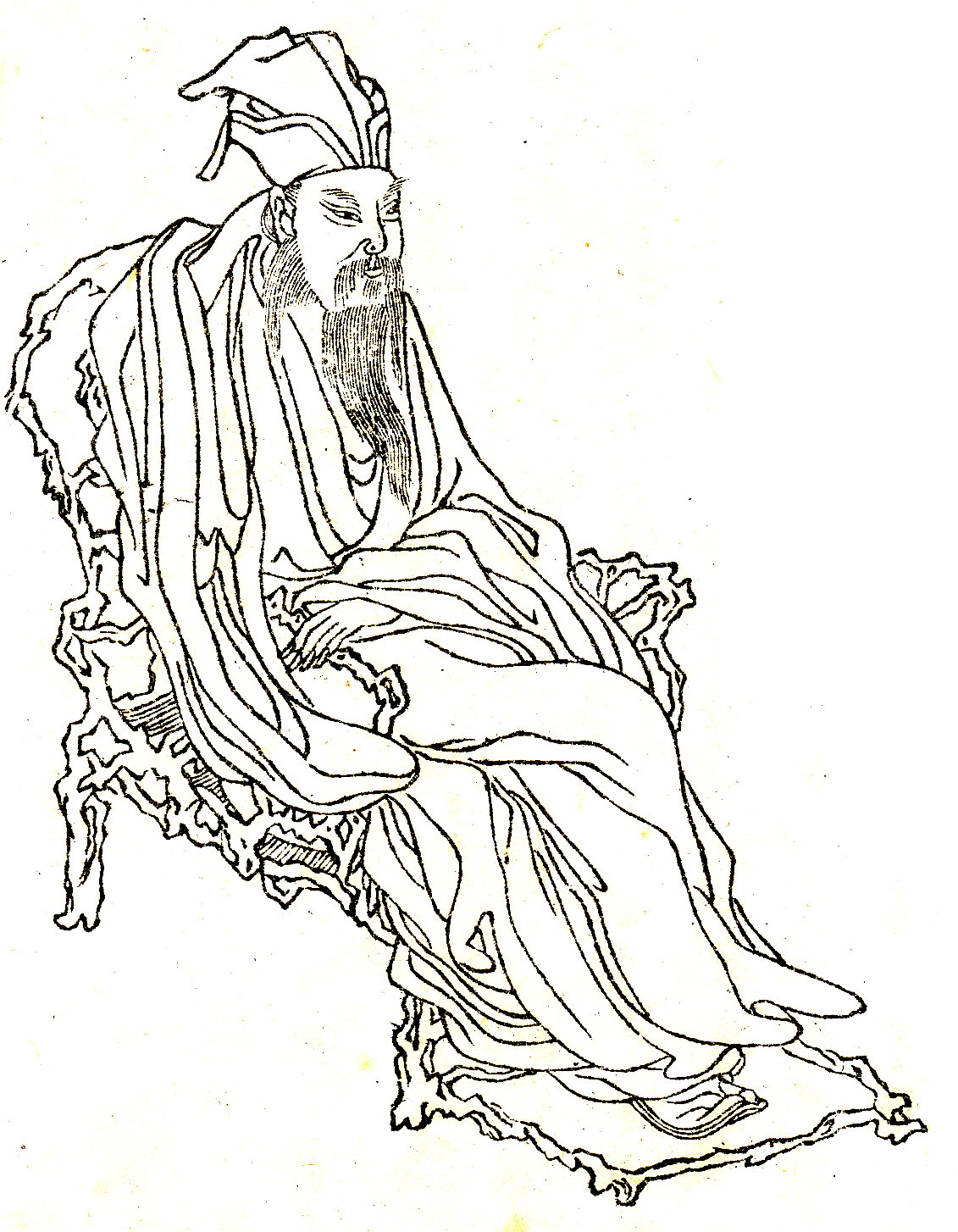
A depiction of Su Shi from 1743

Su Shi had three wives. His first wife was Wang Fu (1039–1065) from Sichuan, who was sixteen when they married. She died on the second day of the fifth month 13 years later, (Note: 14 June 1065 in the Gregorian calendar) after bearing him a son, Su Mai (蘇邁). Heartbroken, Su Shi wrote a memorial (亡妻王氏墓志銘), stating that Wang had not just been a virtuous wife, but had also frequently advised him regarding the integrity of his acquaintances during his time as an official.

Ten years after the death of his first wife, Su Shi composed a ci poem after dreaming of her while in Mi Prefecture. The poem, "To the tune ,"River Town" (江城子), remains one of the most famous poems Su Shi wrote.

In 1068, two years after Wang's death, Su Shi married her cousin Wang Runzhi (王閏之, 1048–1093), who was 11 years his junior. Wang Runzhi spent the next 25 years accompanying Su Shi through his ups and downs in officialdom and political exile. Su Shi praised Runzhi for being an understanding wife who treated his three sons equally (his eldest, Su Mai (苏迈; 蘇邁), was born by Wang Fu). Once, Su Shi was angry with his young son for not understanding his unhappiness during his political exile. Wang Runzhi chided Su Shi for his silliness, prompting Su Shi to write the domestic poem "Young Son" (小兒).

Wang Runzhi died in 1093, at forty-six, after bearing two sons, Su Dai (苏迨; 蘇迨) and Su Guo (苏过; 蘇過). Overwhelmed by grief, Su Shi expressed his wish to be buried with her in her memorial (祭亡妻同安郡君文).

Su's third wife, Wang Zhaoyun (王朝雲, 1062–1095) was a former Qiantang courtesan. Wang was about twelve when Su bought her at Hangzhou. Zhaoyun learned to read and write at Su's house. Of all the women in Su's life, Zhaoyun was probably the most famous, as she tried to "grow to her husband's spiritual level", and who seems to "understands him best". Su expressed his gratitude to Zhaoyun for her companionship to his exile in his old age, as well as her shared quest with the poet for immortal life via Buddhist and Taoist practice.

Su's friend, fellow poet Qin Guan wrote a poem, "A Gift for Dongpo's concubine Zhaoyun" (贈東坡妾朝雲), praising her beauty and lovely voice. Su Shi himself dedicated a number of his poems to Zhaoyun, including "To the Tune of 'Song of the South'"(南歌子), "Verses for Zhaoyun" (朝雲詩), "To the Tune of 'The Beauty Who Asks One To Stay'" (殢人嬌·贈朝雲), and "To the Tune of 'The Moon at Western Stream'" (西江月). Zhaoyun remained a faithful companion to Su Shi after Runzhi's death, and died of illness on 13 August 1095 (紹聖三年七月五日) at Huizhou. Zhaoyun bore Su Shi a son, Su Dun (蘇遁), on 15 November 1083, who died in infancy. After Zhaoyun's death, Su Shi never married again.

Being a government official in a family of officials, Su Shi was often separated from his loved ones depending on his posting. In 1078, he was serving as prefect of Suzhou. His beloved younger brother was able to join him for the mid-autumn festival, which inspired the poem "Mid-Autumn Moon" reflecting on the preciousness of time with family. It was written to be sung to the tune of "Yang Pass."

As evening clouds withdraw a clear cool air floods in

the jade wheel passes silently across the Silver River this life this night has rarely been kind

where will we see this moon next year

Su Shi had three sons who survived to adulthood: the eldest, Su Mai (蘇邁), who would also become a government official by 1084; the second, Su Dai (蘇迨); and the third, Su Guo (蘇過). When Su Shi died in 1101, his younger brother Su Zhe (蘇轍) buried him alongside his second wife Wang Runzhi according to his wishes.

== Work ==
=== Overview ===
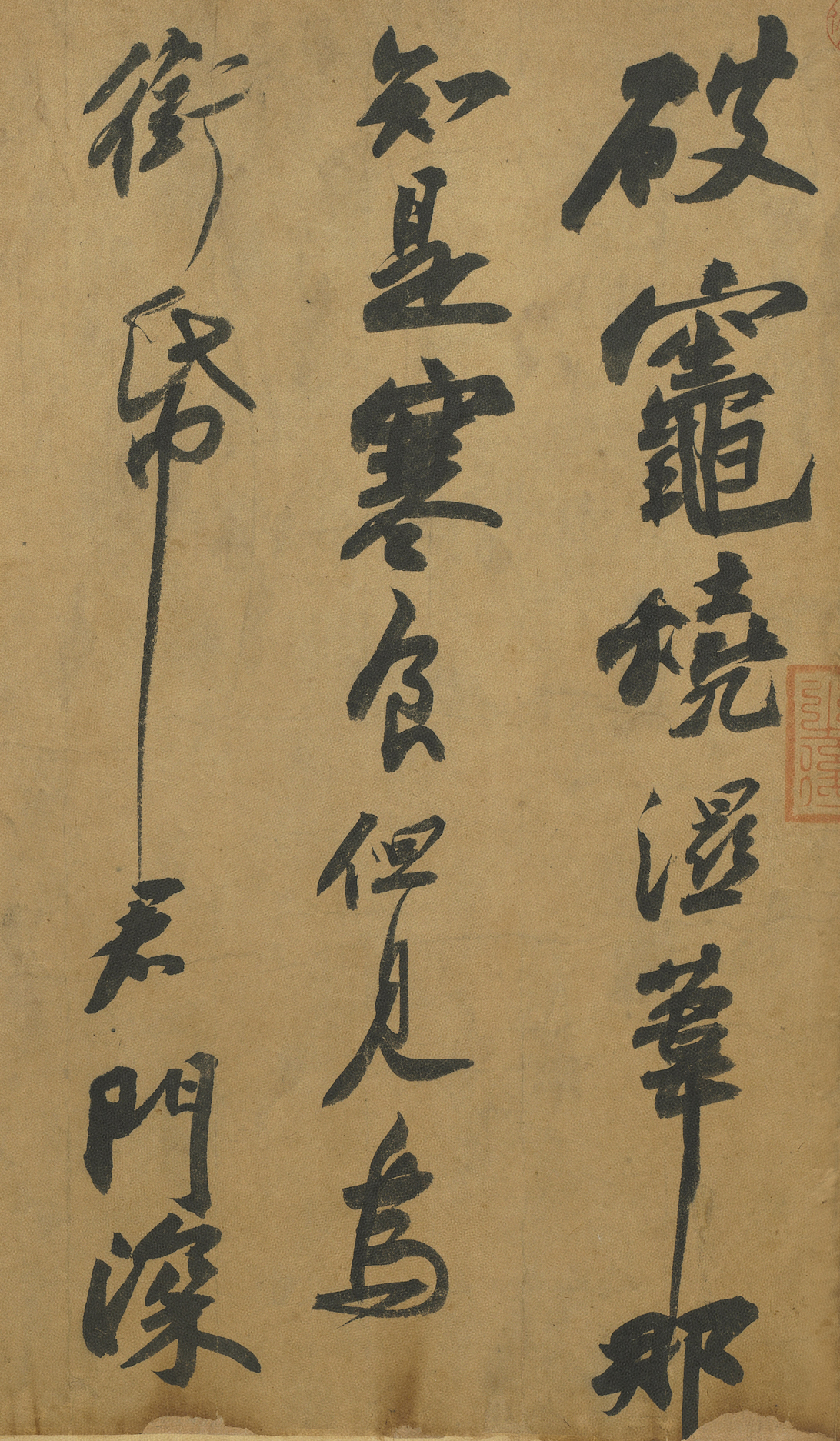
Calligraphy by Su Shi: A detail of The Cold Food Observance (寒食帖)

Approximately 2,700 poems and 800 letters penned by Su Shi have been preserved to date. His mastery spanned across various forms, including the shi, ci and fu styles of poetry, as well as prose, calligraphy, and painting. While a significant portion of his poetry is in the shi format, it is his 350 ci style poems that largely cemented his poetic legacy.

Su Shi's repertoire also includes a substantial body of essays, with many focusing on politics and governance. One of them being Liuhoulun (留侯論). He is recognized as one of the most esteemed essayists of the Tang and Song dynasties, earning him a place among the Eight Great Prose Masters of the Tang and Song.

In both his literary creations and visual artistry, Su Shi seamlessly blended elements of spontaneity, objectivity with detailed and vivid depictions of the natural world.

=== Poetry ===
Su is renowned as a pioneer of the háofàng (豪放) school in ci poetry, characterized by a spirit of boldness and a broader theme. Su expanded the ci genre's thematic range, infusing it with a variety of non-traditional topics, many of which were drawn from his own life experiences. His lyrics delved into deeper, more contemplative subjects like aging, mortality, and the intricacies of public service, resonating more profoundly with contemporary audiences. As an innovator of the háofàng style, he introduced elements typically associated with masculine activities, including hunting motifs, and intertwined Buddhist philosophical concepts and political references, traditionally reserved for more esteemed forms of poetry.

Some of his notable poetry works include the First and Second Chibifu (赤壁賦 The Red Cliffs, written during his first exile), Nian Nu Jiao: Chibi Huai Gu (念奴嬌·赤壁懷古 Remembering Chibi, to the tune of Nian Nu Jiao) and Shui diao ge tou (水調歌頭 Remembering Su Zhe on the Mid-Autumn Festival, 中秋節). The two former fu-style poems were inspired by the Battle of Chibi, a naval battle of the Three Kingdoms era that occurred in the year 208.

In one of his shi style poems, Su famously described the difficulty of conveying Mount Lu's beauty: "Why can't I tell the true shape of Mount Lu? Because I myself am in the mountain."

Su wrote multiple poems at Huangzhou amid political banishment; in fact, the Huangzhou exile was a most prolific period for the poet.

One of the examples is a playful and biting poem on the first bath of his new-born son by his third wife Zhaoyun.

On the Birth of a Son .洗兒戲作

人皆養子望聰明,
我被聰明誤一生;
惟願孩子愚且魯,
無災無難到公卿.

Translation:

Families when a child is born
Hope it will turn out intelligent,
I, through intelligence
Having wrecked my whole life;
Only hope that the baby will prove
Ignorant and stupid,
Then he'll be happy all his days
And grow into a cabinet minister.

"Immortal by the River" Returning at Night to Linggao" (臨江仙 · 夜歸臨皋) (written in 1082 CE):

夜飲東坡醒復醉,
歸來彷彿三更.
家童鼻息已雷鳴.
敲門都不應,
倚杖聽江聲.
長恨此身非我有,
何時忘卻營營.
夜闌風靜縠紋平.
小舟從此逝,
江海寄餘生.

Translation:

Drinking at night on the Eastern Slope, I sobered up and got drunk again,
When I arrived back home, it was about midnight.
The young servant was snoring like thunder,
not responding, no matter how hard I knocked.
Supported by a walking stick, I listened to the river.
I have long regretted that this body does not belong to me.
When can I stop pursuing fame and money?
The night comes to an end, the wind stops, and the waves in the ravine die down.
Let me drift away on a small boat from now on,
and entrust the rest of my life to rivers and seas.

Composed in 1082 CE, this song reflects the period when Su Shi faced demotion and relocation, now known as the Huangzhou district in Hubei Province. Despite enduring political adversity, Su Shi maintained an appreciation for the natural world. The lyrics convey his aspiration to abandon the chase for status, fame, and wealth, and instead embrace a life of seclusion.

''Settling Wind Waves (Ding feng-bo) (定風波)'':

莫聽穿林打葉聲,
何妨吟嘯且徐行.
竹杖芒鞋輕勝馬,
誰怕?
一簑湮雨任平生.

料峭春風吹酒醒,
微冷,
山頭斜照卻相迎.
回首向來蕭瑟處,
歸去,
也無風雨也無晴.

Translation:

Pay no heed to those sounds, piercing the woods, hitting leaves--
why should it stop me from whistling or chanting and walking slowly along?
With my bamboo cane and sandals of straw I move more free than on horse.
Who's afraid?
Let my life be spent with a raincoat in the misty rain.

A biting chill in the spring breeze blows me sober from wine,
A bit cold,
but the sunshine that sinks on the hilltop comes back to welcome me.
Turn your head to where you just were, where the winds were howling,
go back--
on the one hand, it's not a storm; on the other, not clear skies.

— translated by Stephen Owen

His popular politically charged poetry was often the reason for the wrath of Wang Anshi's supporters towards him, culminating with the Crow Terrace Poetry Trial of 1079. He also wrote poems on Buddhist topics, including a poem later extensively commented on by Eihei Dōgen, founder of the Japanese Sōtō school of Zen, in a chapter of his work Shōbōgenzō entitled The Sounds of Valley Streams, the Forms of Mountains.

The English translations of his poems include those by Stephen Owen, Burton Watson, and Arthur Waley.

=== Travel literature ===
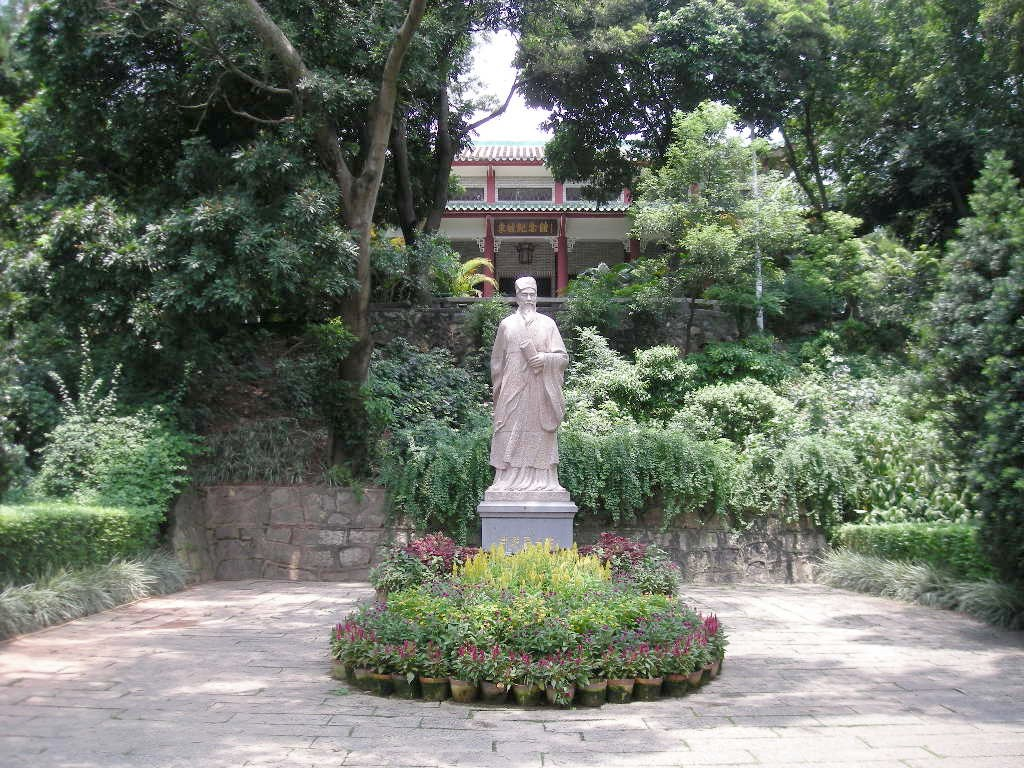
The Su Dongpo Memorial of Huizhou.

Su Shi also wrote of his travel experiences in 'daytrip essays', which belonged in part to the popular Song era literary category of 'travel record literature' (youji wenxue) that employed the use of narrative, diary, and prose styles of writing. Although other works in Chinese travel literature contained a wealth of cultural, geographical, topographical, and technical information, the central purpose of the daytrip essay was to use a setting and event in order to convey a philosophical or moral argument, which often employed persuasive writing. For example, Su Shi's daytrip essay known as Record of Stone Bell Mountain investigates and then judges whether or not ancient texts on 'stone bells' were factually accurate.

=== Iron industry ===
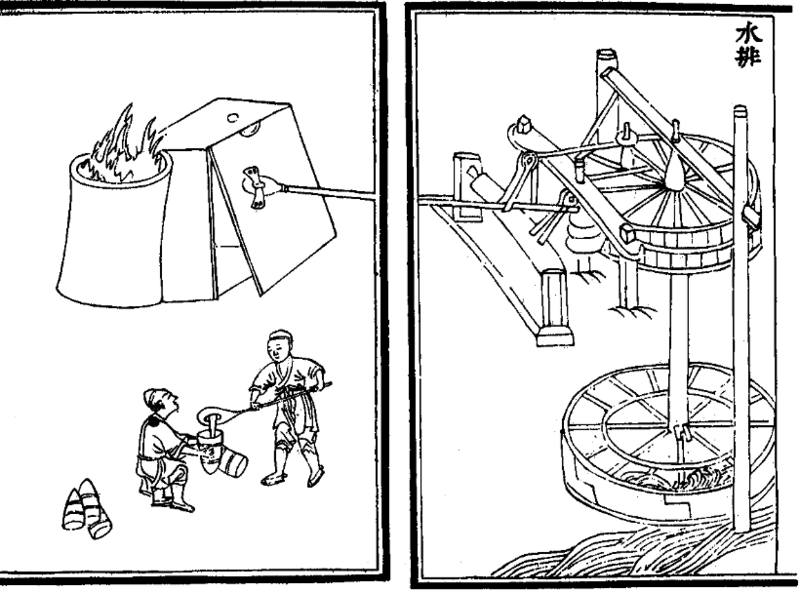
An illustration of a blast furnace smelting cast iron, with bellows operated by a waterwheel and mechanical device, from the Nong Shu, by Wang Zhen, 1313

While acting as Governor of Xuzhou in 1078, Su wrote a memorial to the imperial court about issues faced in the Liguo Industrial Prefecture was under his administration. In an interesting and revealing passage about the Chinese iron industry during the latter half of the 11th century, Su Shi wrote about the enormous size of the workforce employed in the iron industry, competing provinces that had rival iron manufacturers seeking favor from the central government, as well as the danger of rising local strongmen who had the capability of raiding the industry and threatening the government with effectively armed rebellion. It also becomes clear in reading the text that prefectural government officials in Su's time often had to negotiate with the central government in order to meet the demands of local conditions.

=== Technical issues of hydraulic engineering ===
During the ancient Han dynasty (202 BCE – 220 CE) of China, the sluice gate and canal lock of the flash lock had been known. By the 10th century the latter design was improved upon in China with the invention of the canal pound lock, allowing different adjusted levels of water along separated and gated segments of a canal. This innovation allowed for larger transport barges to pass safely without danger of wrecking upon the embankments, and was an innovation praised by those such as Shen Kuo (1031–1095). Shen also wrote in his Dream Pool Essays of the year 1088 that, if properly used, sluice gates positioned along irrigation canals were most effective in depositing silt for fertilization. Writing earlier in his Dongpo Zhilin of 1060, Su Shi came to a different conclusion, writing that the Chinese of a few centuries past had perfected this method and noted that it was ineffective in use by his own time.

Although Su Shi made no note of it in his writing, the root of this problem was merely the needs of agriculture and transportation conflicting with one another.

=== Gastronome ===
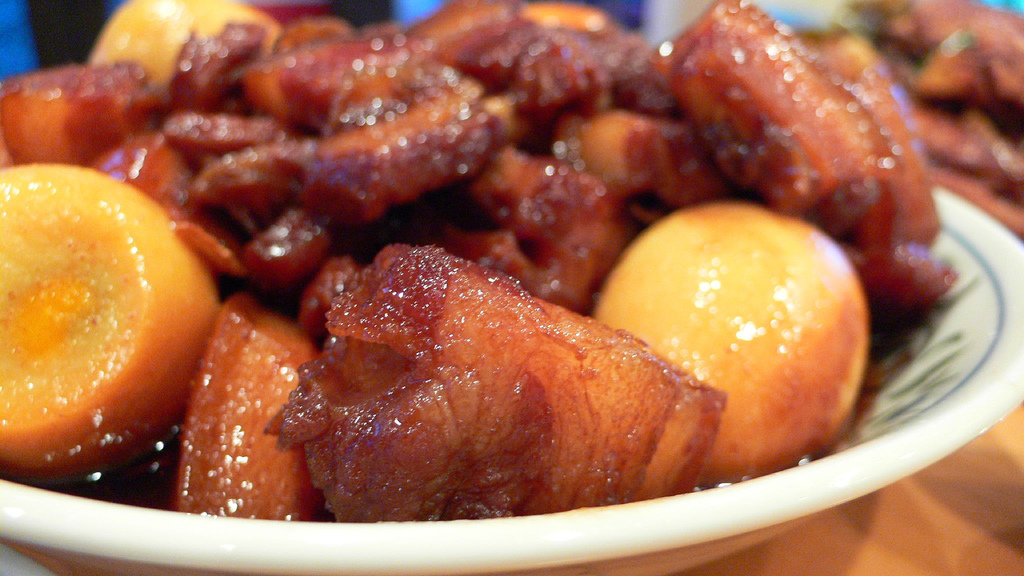
Dongpo pork

Su is called one of the four classical gastronomes. The other three are Ni Zan (1301–74), Xu Wei (1521–93), and Yuan Mei (1716–97). There is a legend, for which there is no evidence, that by accident he invented Dongpo pork, a famous dish in later centuries. Lin Hsiang Ju and Lin Tsuifeng in their scholarly Chinese Gastronomy give a recipe, "The Fragrance of Pork: Tungpo Pork", and remark that the "square of fat is named after Su Dongpo, the poet, for unknown reasons. Perhaps it is just because he would have liked it." A story runs that once Su Shi had decided to make stewed pork. Then an old friend visited him in the middle of the cooking and challenged him to a game of Chinese chess. Su Shi had totally forgotten the stew, which in the meantime had now become extremely thick-cooked, until its very fragrant smell reminded him of it. Some legends point to the contrary, however, where other villagers simply named the pork dish after him to honour his death, although no concrete evidence points to any conclusion.

Su, to explain his vegetarian inclinations, said that he never had been comfortable with killing animals for his dinner table, but had a craving for certain foods, such as clams, so he could not desist. When he was imprisoned his views changed: "Since my imprisonment I have not killed a single thing... having experienced such worry and danger myself, when I felt just like a fowl waiting in the kitchen, I can no longer bear to cause any living creature to suffer immeasurable fright and pain simply to please my palate."

== See also ==
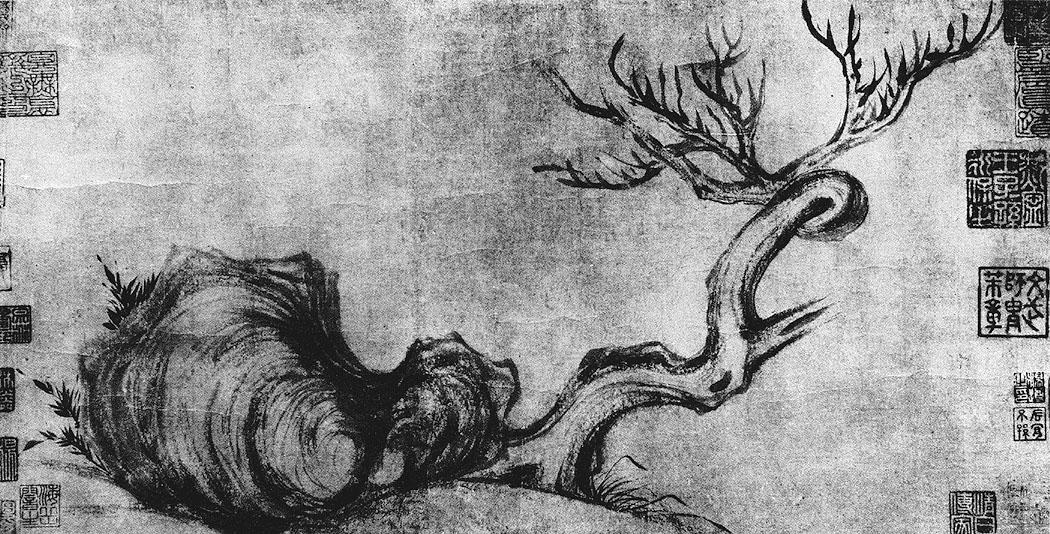
Wood and Rock

- Chinese literature
- Chinese poetry
- Classical Chinese poetry
- Culture of the Song Dynasty
- History of the Song Dynasty
- Song poetry
- Tao Yuanming
- Wang Shen

== Translations ==
- Watson, Burton (translator). Selected Poems of Su Tung-p'o. (English only). Copper Canyon Press, 1994.
- Xu Yuanchong (translator). Selected Poems of Su Shi. (Chinese with English translations). Hunan: Hunan People's Publishing House, 2007.
