= Pianwen =

Style of classical Chinese writing

Pianwen (traditional Chinese: 駢文; simplified Chinese: 骈文; pinyin: piánwén; lit. 'parallel writing') is a highly stylised prose style, prevalent throughout the history of Chinese literature. Its prominent features lie in its regular lines arranged in couplets; in its early history, these lines were mostly of either four or six characters, and so pianwen are also known as Four-Six Prose (四六文).

While the pianwen form was frequently utilised in official writings, or in describing scenery, its tight restrictions in metrical, tonal and thematic terms restricted its literary development. Subsequent movements, such as the Classical Prose Movement, were a response to these restrictions, but pianwen would continue to be written until the end of the Imperial Chinese era and the widespread use of vernacular Chinese in writing.

== Name ==
According to the Shuowen Jiezi, the word pian (駢), with a horse radical and the character for 'aligned, in line', originally referred to a two-horse carriage where the horses run alongside each other. This is analogous to the way pianwen couplets are aligned and parallel each other.

== Characteristics ==
The characteristics and restrictions on pianwen prose evolved throughout its long history, but its key feature is the predominance of couplets. The Chinese couplet form is more tightly restrained than in English; these restrictions include:

- Length: Couplets are almost invariably of the same length. In its early stages, lines of four or six characters were most prevalent, though five or seven, or even more characters also occurred. During the Southern dynasties period, though, four or six lines became the standard.
- Structure: The phrase structure within the couplets should match – verbs to verbs, nouns to nouns, and nouns of certain categories together with, or in contrast with, each other. The opening of the Tengwang Ge Xu, introducing the location of the pavilion, illustrates this:

豫章故郡，
洪都新府。
星分翼軫 ，
地接衡廬。

Translation:

Formerly Yuzhang Commandery,
Currently Hongdu Prefecture.
Among stars, it separates the Wings and Chariot Constellations,
On the ground, it abuts the Heng and Lu Mountains..."

- Tone: As tone became a feature of spoken Chinese during the period when pianwen became widespread, rules began to arise restricting couplets in this regard too, becoming more complex by the Tang dynasty.

At the same time, the use of uncommon words and allusions to literary or historical events was also emphasised.

== History ==
The use of couplets in prose writing, with each line matching in length and reinforcing a certain theme, has ancient roots in Chinese prose; examples can be seen in the Book of Documents, dating from the Zhou dynasty. Li Si's Jianzhuke Shu (Petition against the Expulsion of Guest-officers), from the Warring States period, also contained couplets.

However, the writing of essays composed almost entirely of such couplets first arose during the Han dynasty, and became widespread during the Wei–Jin period and the Northern and Southern dynasties. The pianwen form was especially suited to the descriptive themes common in this period, and during the Southern dynasties it became obligatory to write court documents in the pianwen form as well; this explicit official backing further spurred the development of pianwen prose as an art form.

A renowned pianwen essay is the Tengwang Ge Xu, written by the early Tang dynasty poet Wang Bo; by the mid-Tang, however, the Classical Prose Movement headed by Han Yu and Liu Zongyuan challenged the pianwen form, advocating a return to the freer, more direct and less restrained prose that prevailed in pre-imperial times. While this movement waned in the late Tang era, it was revived under writers like Ouyang Xiu, Zeng Gong and Su Shi, and eventually the pianwen form fell out of favour as a literary form from the mid-Song onwards, in favour of the revived "classical style". The preference for freer prose can be seen in the grouping of the Eight Great Prose Masters of the Tang and Song, all of whom were accomplished in the classical style rather than the pianwen form.

During the Qing dynasty, pianwen again experienced a resurgence, before falling into disuse as vernacular Chinese overtook Classical Chinese as the standard written form of the language. The characteristics of vernacular Chinese, where many words are formed from more than one character, make it almost impossible to write the strictly parallel couplets demanded by pianwen.

== See also ==
- Classical Prose Movement
- Chen Weisong
- Han Yu
- Tengwang Ge Xu
