= Mao Kun =

Chinese writer (1512–1601)

- 茅坤
- Born: 1512; Gui'an, Zhejiang
- Died: 1601 (aged 88–89)
- Education: jinshi degree (1538)

Chinese name
- Chinese: 茅坤
Transcriptions
Standard Mandarin
- Hanyu Pinyin: Máo Kūn

Mao Kun (Note: Mao Kun used the courtesy name Shunfu (順甫) and the art name Lumen (鹿門).) (1512–1601) was a Ming dynasty Chinese writer, collector, and government official.

== Biography ==
Mao Kun was from Gui'an County (present-day Wuxing, Zhejiang) in eastern Ming China. He spent his youth studying the Confucian classics and successfully passed the civil service examinations, eventually achieving the highest level—the palace examination—and earning the jinshi degree in 1538. He then embarked on his official career, starting as a magistrate in Qingyang and later in Dansi. He was later transferred to the Ministry of Rites as a secretary and also worked in the Bureau of Records of the Ministry of Personnel. He also served in various provinces, including as an assistant to the prefect of Guangping, assistant commander of the regional defense command in Guangxi, assistant provincial administrator of Henan, and vice commander of the regional defense command in Daming. Due to injuries sustained in battle, he retired from government service and focused on his literary pursuits.

He was part of a group of writers, including Tang Shunzhi, Wang Shenzhong, and Gui Youguang, who held the works of Tang and Song period authors in high regard, in contrast to the earlier and later Seven Masters of the Ming who praised poets from the High Tang era and earlier, as well as Han authors in prose. He compiled the anthology Tang–Song badajia wenchao (唐宋八大家文鈔; 'The Collected Essays of the Eight Masters of Tang and Song Dynasties'), which featured works by eight renowned Tang and Song writers: Han Yu, Liu Zongyuan, Ouyang Xiu, Su Shi, Su Xun, Su Zhe, Wang Anshi, and Zeng Gong. This anthology gained widespread popularity and was used as a source of texts by these authors in many schools. He also delved into literary theory, believing that writing was a manifestation of the Way (Dao). He believed that in order to find the Way, a writer should first study the works of more recent authors and then gradually move back to the masters of antiquity.

He was credited with creating the Mao Kun map, which was included in the military encyclopedia Wubei Zhi, compiled by his grandson Mao Yuanyi. The map, consisting of 40 sheets, depicts the maritime route from the mouth of the Yangtze River through Southeast Asia and the Indian Ocean to the Persian Gulf and Africa.
