= Kōraku-en =

Garden in Okayama, Japan

- 後楽園
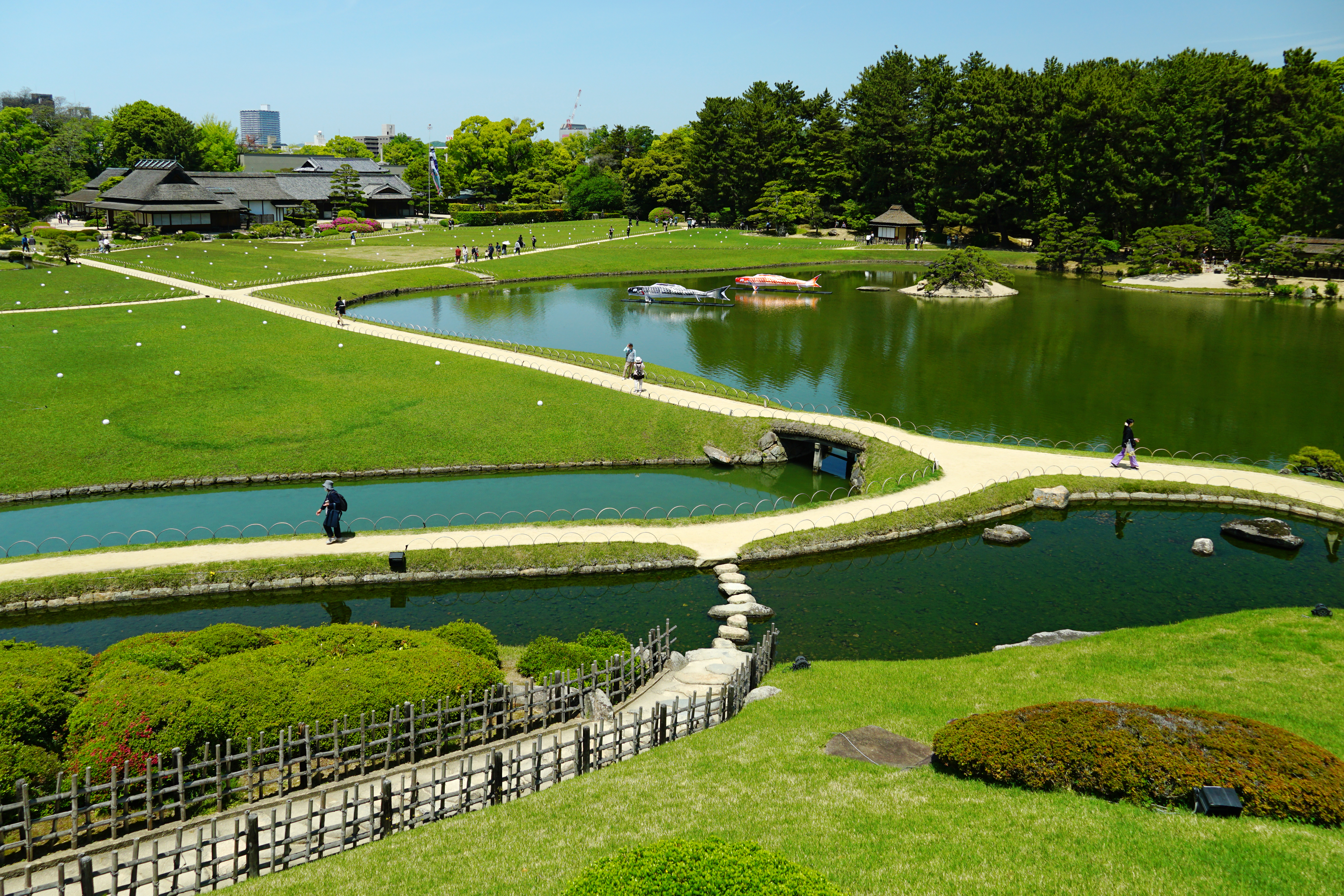
- View from Yuishinzan Hill

- Location within Japan Location within Okayama Prefecture
- Type: Urban park
- Location: Okayama, Okayama Prefecture, Japan
- Coordinates: 34°40′04″N 133°56′06″E
- Created: 1687

Kōraku-en (後楽園, Kōrakuen) is a Japanese garden located in Okayama, Okayama Prefecture. It is one of the Three Great Gardens of Japan, along with Kenroku-en and Kairaku-en. Korakuen was built in 1700 by Ikeda Tsunamasa, lord of Okayama. The garden reached its modern form in 1863.

Zhu Zhiyu, one of the greatest scholars of Confucianism in the Ming dynasty and Edo Japan, helped to redesign the garden.

== History ==
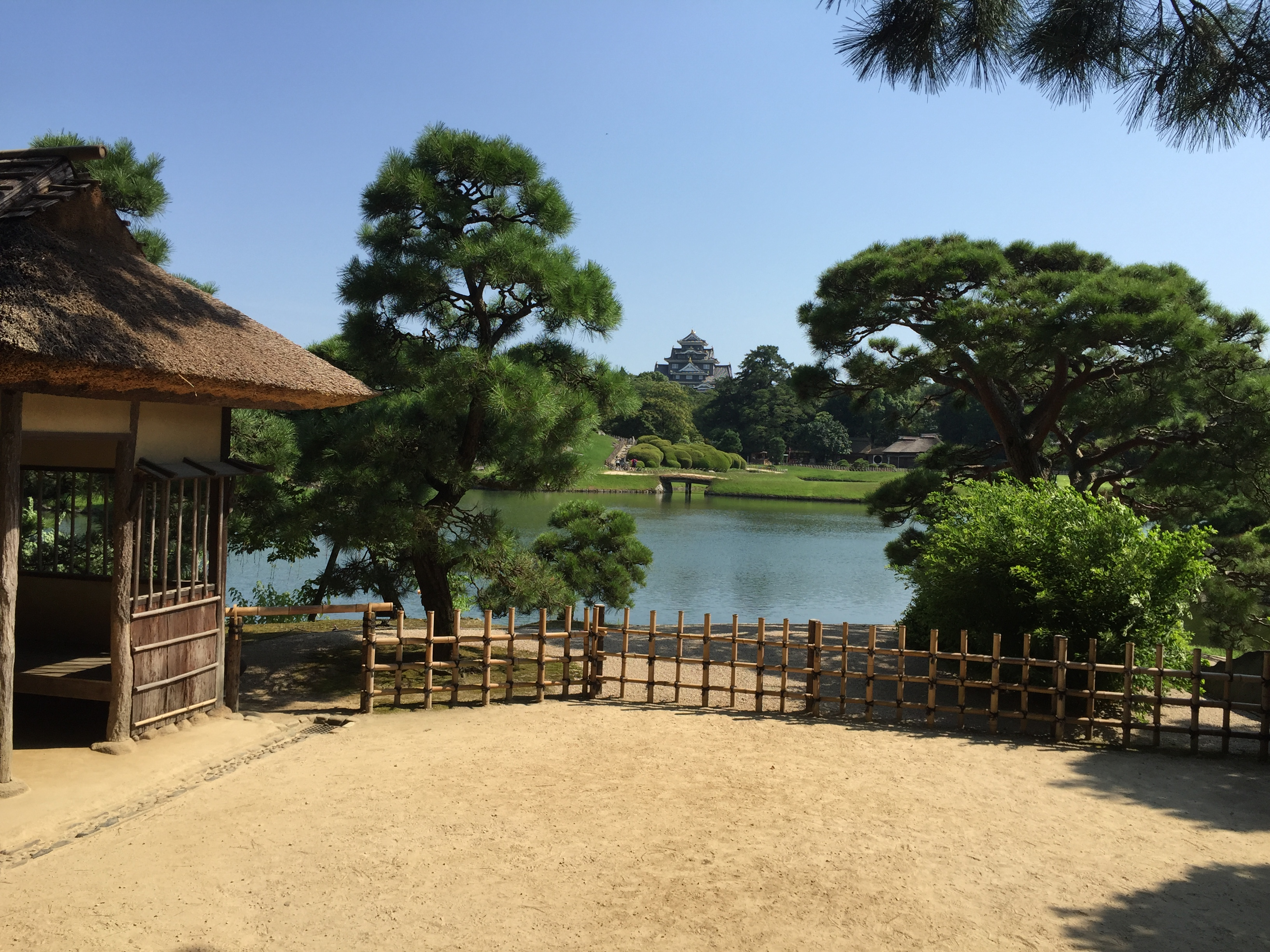
Castle, Koraku-en in Okayama

In 1687, the daimyō Ikeda Tsunamasa ordered Tsuda Nagatada to begin construction of the garden. It was completed in 1700 and has retained its original appearance to the present day, except for a few changes by various daimyōs. The garden was originally called Kōen (後園 "later garden") because it was built after Okayama Castle. However, since the garden was built in the spirit of senyukoraku (先憂後楽 "grieve earlier than others, enjoy later than others"), which was derived from a quote from Fan Zhongyan's Memorial to Yueyang Tower, the name was changed to Kōrakuen (後楽園) in 1871.

The Korakuen is one of the few daimyō gardens in the provinces where historical change can be observed, thanks to the many Edo period paintings and Ikeda family records and documents left behind. The garden was used as a place for entertaining important guests and also as a spa of sorts for daimyōs, although regular folk could visit on certain days.

In 1884, ownership was transferred to Okayama Prefecture and the garden was opened to the public. The garden suffered severe damage during the floods of 1934 and by bombing damage in 1945 during World War II. It has been restored based on Edo-period paintings and diagrams. In 1952, the Kōrakuen was designated as a "Special Scenic Location" under the Cultural Properties Protection Law and is managed as a historical cultural asset to be passed to future generations.

== Features of the Garden ==
The garden is located on the north bank of the Asahi River on an island between the river and a developed part of the city. The garden was designed in the Kaiyu ("scenic promenade") style which presents the visitor with a new view at every turn of the path which connects the lawns, ponds, hills, tea houses, and streams.

The garden covers a total area of approximately 133,000 square meters, with the grassed area covering approximately 18,500 square meters. The length of the stream which runs through the garden is 640 meters. It features a central pond called Sawa-no-ike (Marsh Pond), which contains three islands purported to replicate the scenery around Lake Biwa near Kyoto.

== Gallery ==
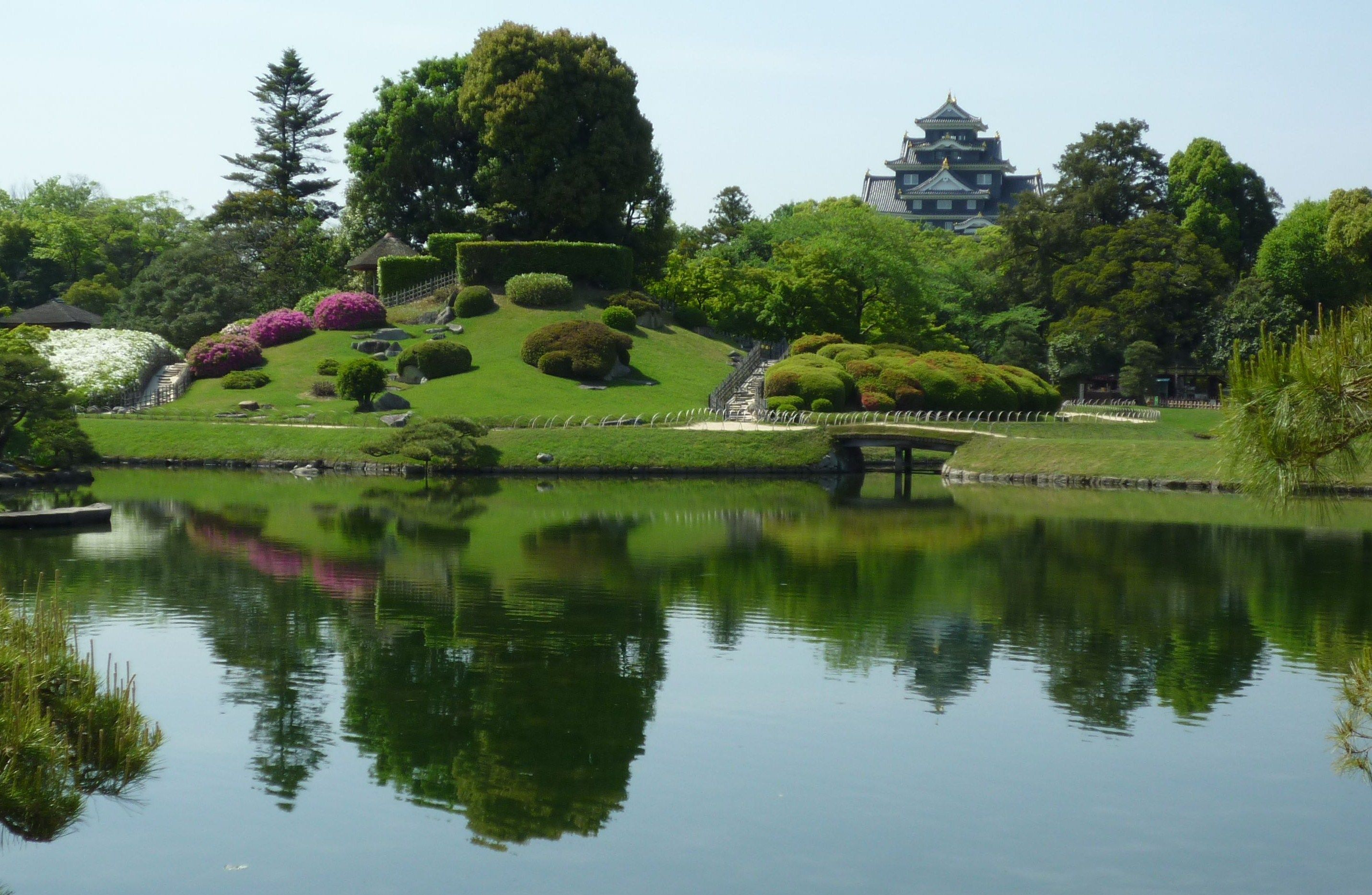
Kōraku-en and Okayama Castle

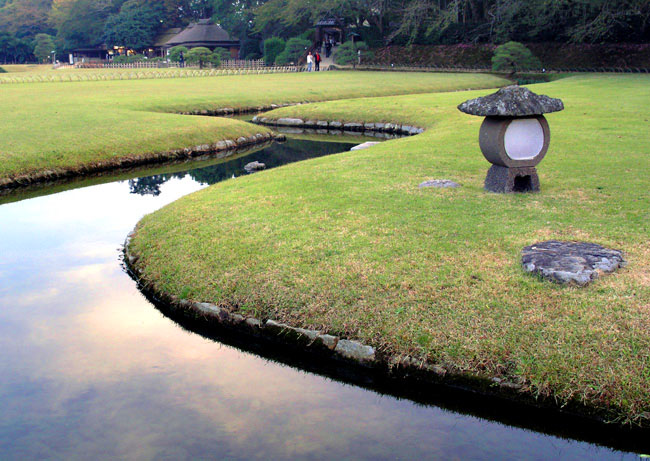
Kyokusui (曲水, Kyokusui)

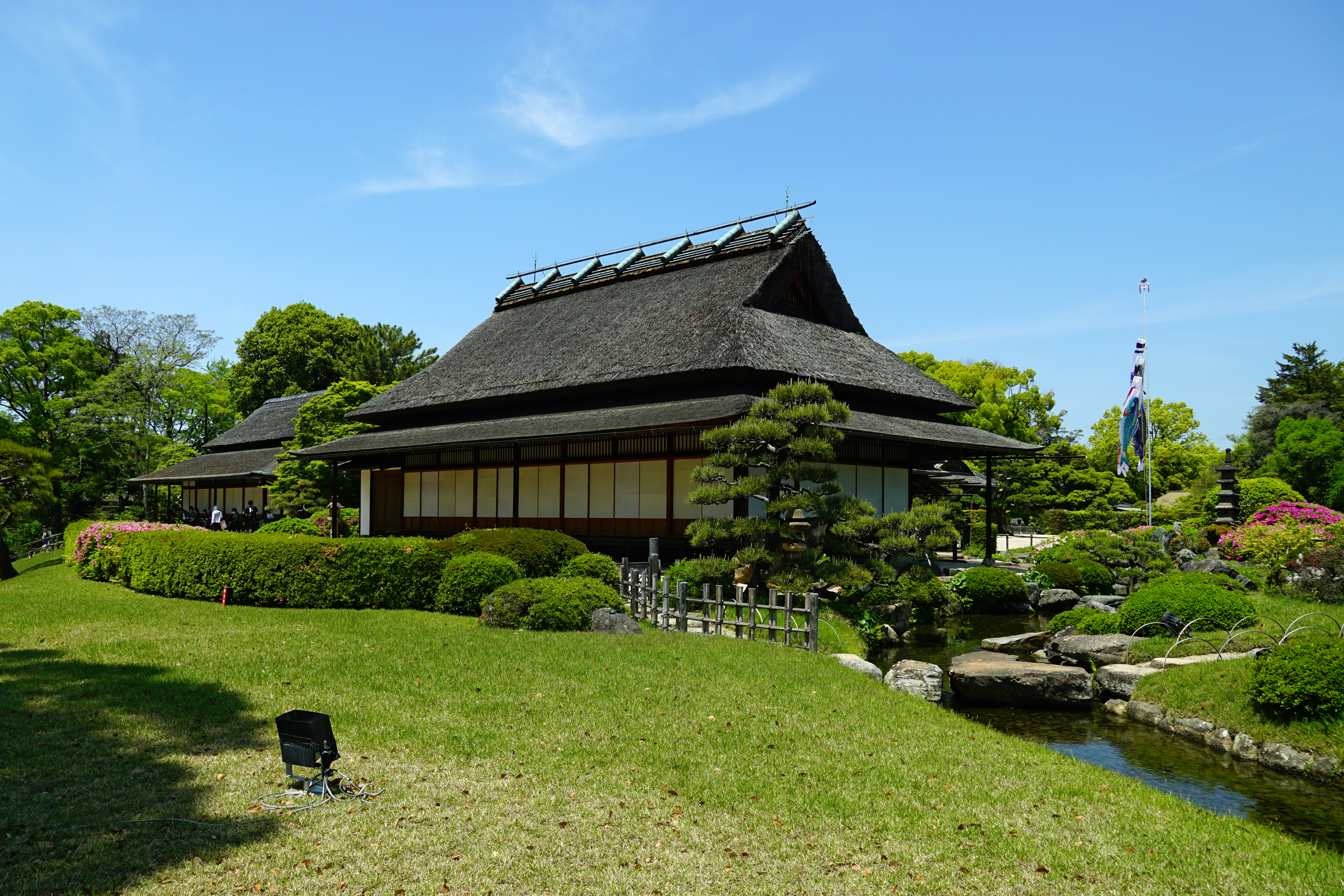
Enyo-tei House

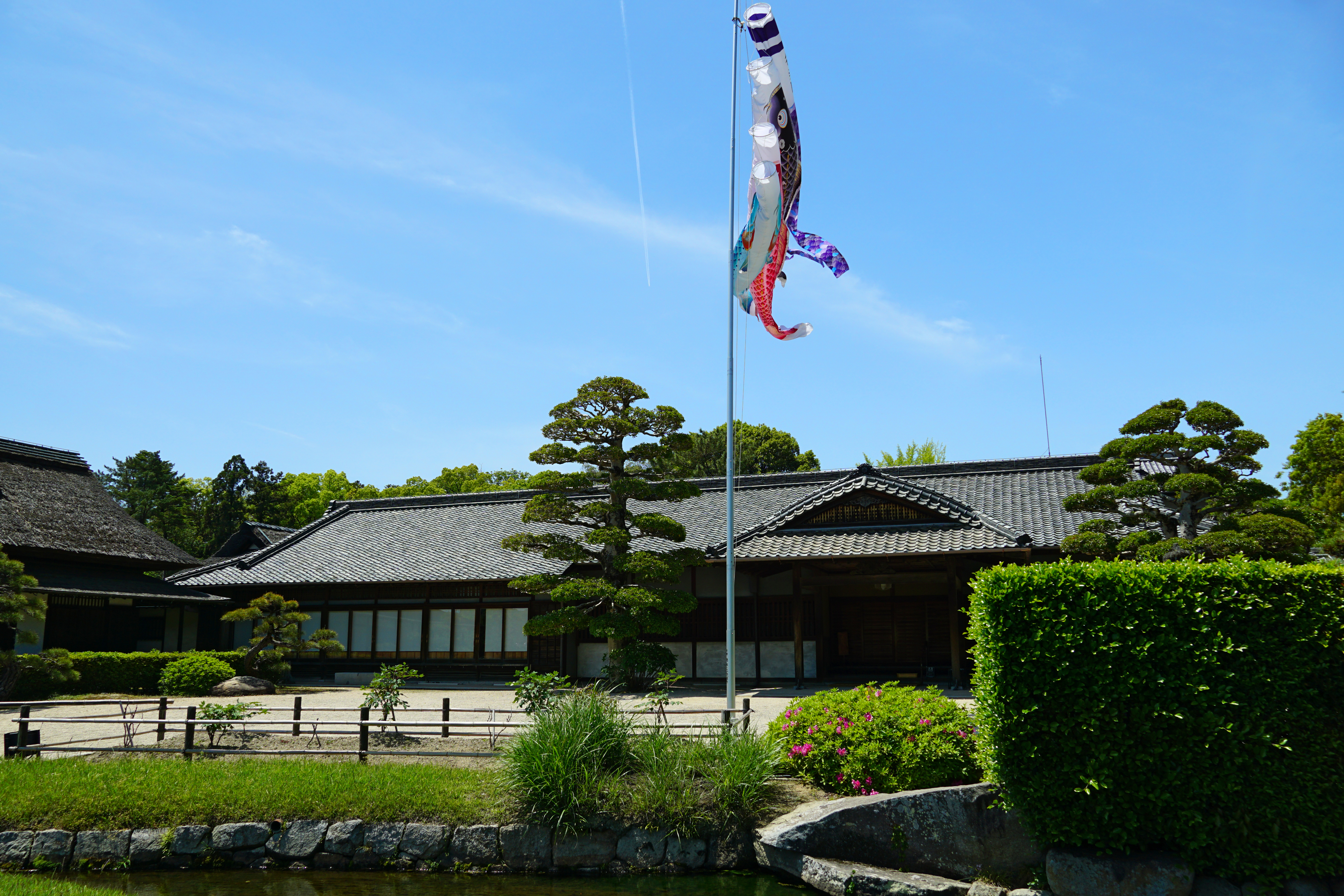
Kakumei-kan

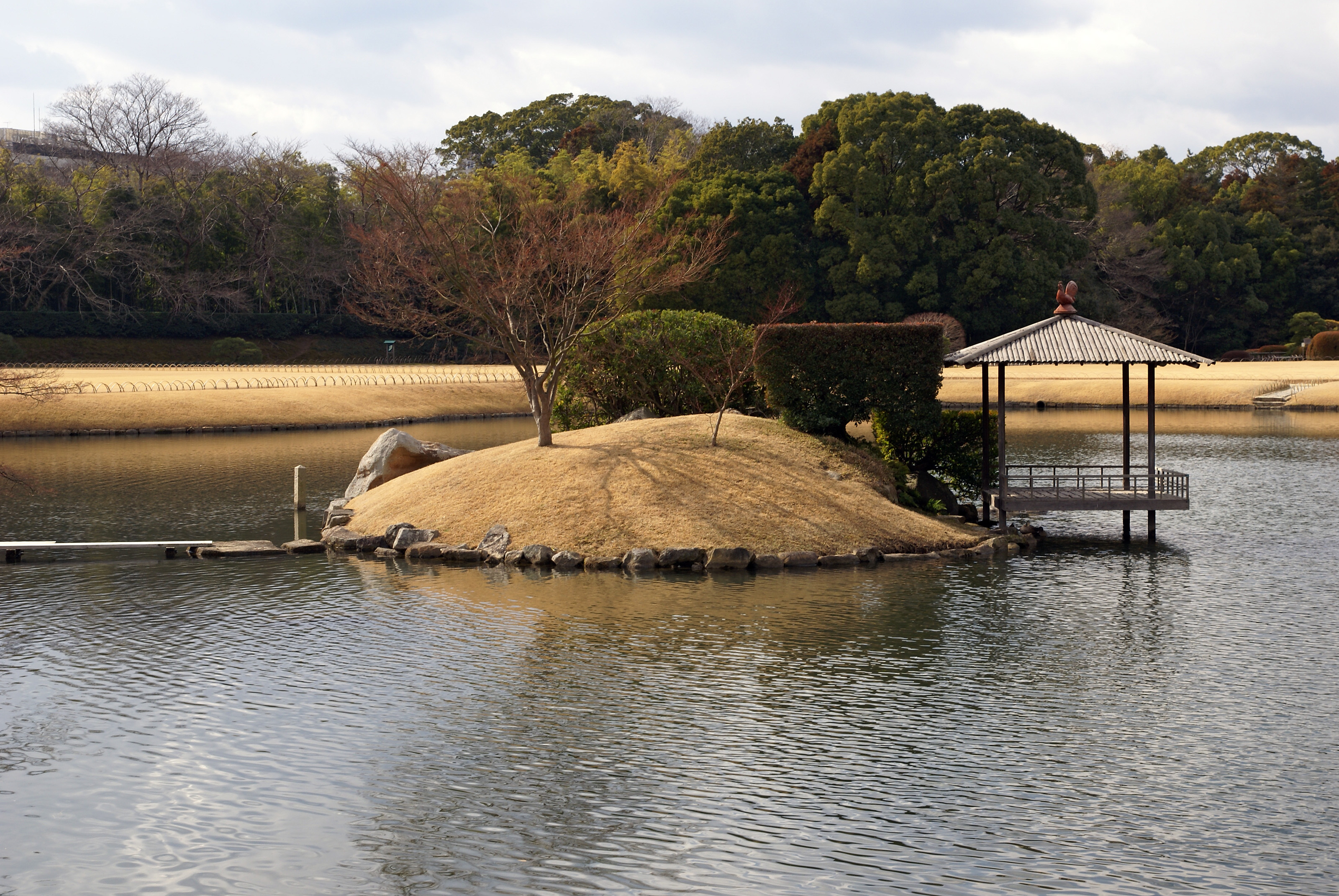
Mino-shima

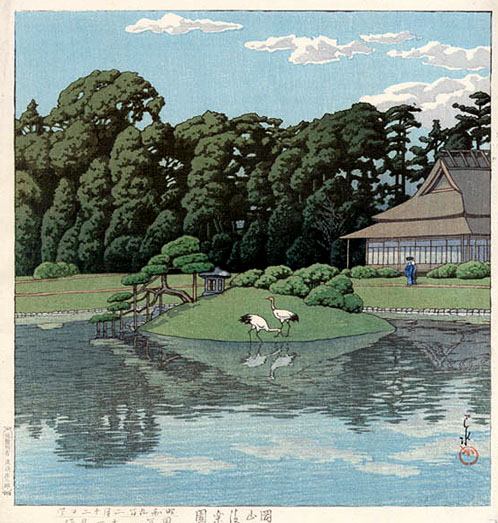
Korakuen Park, Okayamaby Kawase Hasui, 1934

== See also ==
- List of Special Places of Scenic Beauty, Special Historic Sites and Special Natural Monuments
- Tourism in Japan
- Inryoji Temple

== Bibliography ==
- Mansfield, Stephen (2011). Japan's Master Gardens - Lessons in Space and Environment (Hardback). Tokyo, Rutland, Singapore: Tuttle. ISBN 978-4-8053-1128-8.
