= Memorial to Yueyang Tower =

Northern Song text

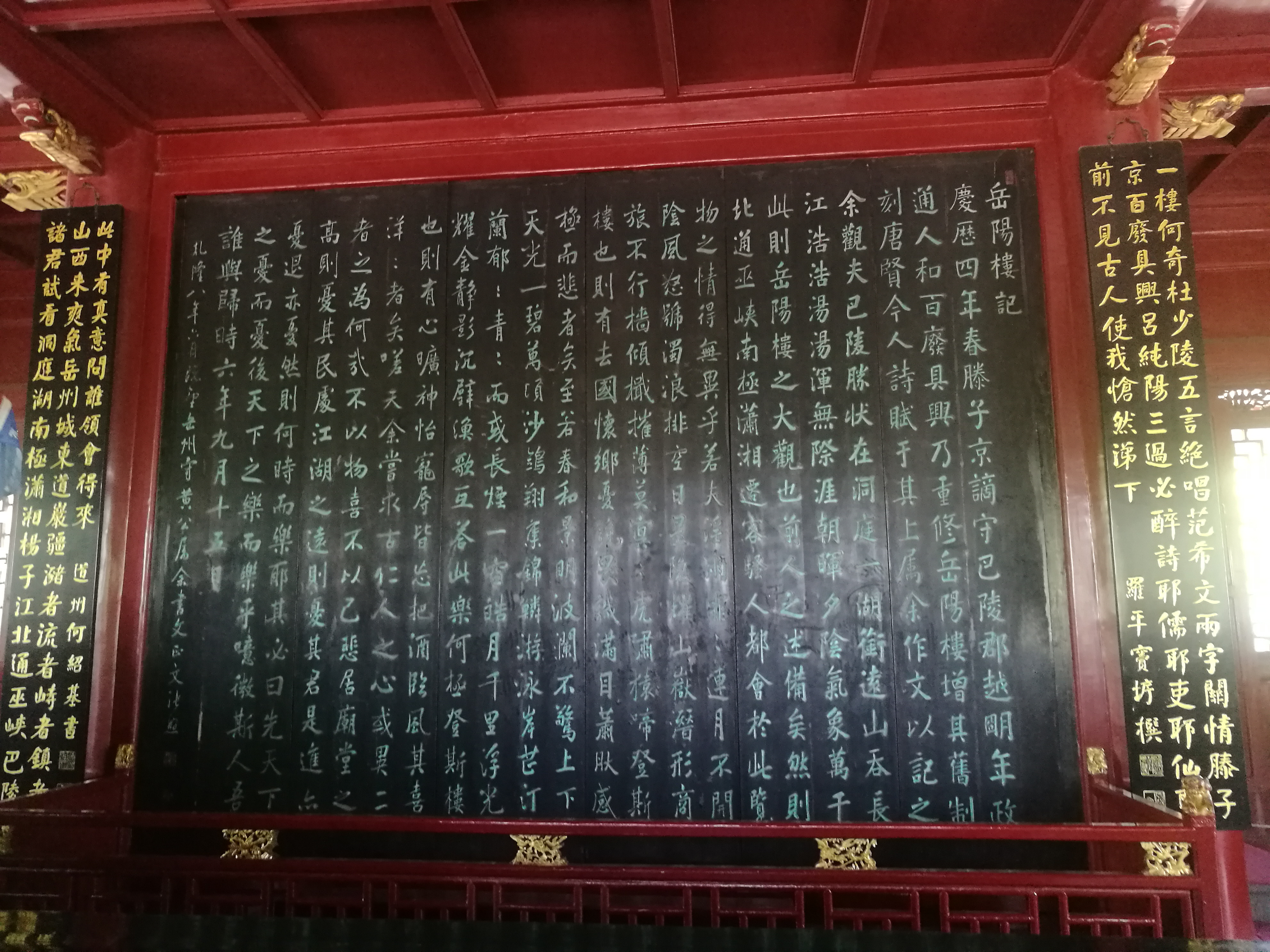
- A wooden screen of On Yueyang Tower, written by calligrapher Zhang Zhao
- Author: Fan Zhongyan
- Language: Classical Chinese
- Publication date: 17 October 1046
- Publication place: Northern Song Dynasty

Chinese name
- Traditional Chinese: 岳陽樓記
- Simplified Chinese: 岳阳楼记
- Literal meaning: "Yueyang Tower Record"
Transcriptions
Standard Mandarin
- Hanyu Pinyin: yuèyánglóu jì

Memorial to Yueyang Tower or On Yueyang Tower is a work of literary prose by Northern Song dynasty author and statesman Fan Zhongyan concerning the scenery as viewed from the titular Yueyang Tower, and the variable emotions it evokes in visitors. The work carries a political undertone, touching on topics of governance and civic duty important to Fan Zhongyan, then exiled after the failiure of the Qingli Reforms.

== History ==
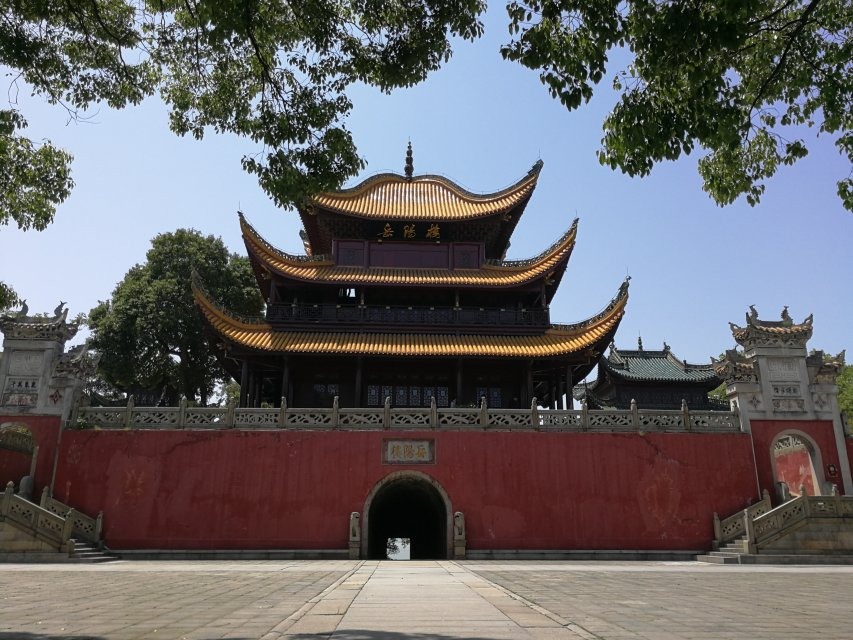
Yueyang Tower

Memorial to Yueyang Tower was commissioned by Teng Zongliang, a friend of Fan Zhongyan's, to commemorate the completion of his restoration efforts. Exiled from the capital to Bailing Prefecture for misappropriation of government funds, Teng Zongliang spent a three years (from 1044 to 1047) as the governor of the prefecture, whereupon he enacted monetary policies which allowed the prefecture to acquire sufficient funds to restore the tower.

Several poems from the Tang and Song Dynasties were also inscribed on the renovated tower at the time.

== Content ==
The work is 368 characters in length; the beginning and end speak of political matters, particularly those pertaining to the virtues of Teng Zongliang's governance, while the middle section remarks on the natural beauty of the area.

The beginning of the text concerns Teng Zijing's banishment from the capital after his misappropriation of government funds and his subsequent rectification of the governance of Bailing Prefecture (in modern day Yangzhou), and the restoration of the tower.

The second part extols the scenery of Dongting Lake; Fan Zhongyan remarks that visitors who come upon the tower during stormy days may be, should they be bitter or homesick, struck by melancholy, but that the same sight in pleasant spring weather may make visitors feel elation and delight.

The end of the text remarks, more abstractly, on the proper virtues of government officials, who should be concerned for the people and their sovereign over themselves. The famous saying "Be concerned before the world is, and be joyful after the world is joyful" (先天下之忧而忧，后天下之乐而乐) originated from Memorial to Yueyang Tower.

Ming Dynasty Calligraphy of On Louyang Tower by Chen Chun（Beijing Palace Museum）

== See also ==
- Zuiwengting Ji
- Eight Masters of the Tang and Song
- Classical Prose Movement
