= Eight Masters of the Tang and Song =

Prominent Chinese writers, 768 to 1086

The Eight Great Prose Masters of the Tang and Song (Chinese: 唐宋八大家; pinyin: Táng Sòng Bā Dàjiā) refers to a group of prominent prose writers during the Tang and Song dynasties. Nearly all of these masters were also accomplished in various aspects of politics and culture during their time. Two of the writers, Han Yu and Liu Zongyuan, were from the Tang dynasty, while the remaining six were from the Song dynasty.

== Background ==
Both the Tang and the Song dynasties were major periods for prose. The anthology Quan Tang Wen (全唐文) includes 20,025 prose works by 3,035 Tang dynasty prose authors, and the anthology Quan Song Wen (全宋文) includes over 170,000 prose works by over 9,000 Song dynasty prose authors.

The list of the "eight great writers" was first compiled in the Ming dynasty by Zhu You (1314—1376), an early Ming scholar who initially collected their essays. It was the late Ming scholar Mao Kun who coined the name in a compilation he curated, titled Selected Works of the Eight Great Prose Masters of the Tang and Song. The subsequent popularity of this book solidified their status as masters of Chinese prose.

During the Qing dynasty, Wei Yuan had eight volumes on the Eight Prose Masters (《纂评唐宋八大家文读本》).

== The eight ==
1. Han Yu (768–824)
2. Liu Zongyuan (773–819)
3. Ouyang Xiu (1007–1072)
4. Su Xun (1009–1066)
5. Su Shi (1037–1101)
6. Su Zhe (1039–1112)
7. Wang Anshi (1021–1086)
8. Zeng Gong (1019–1083)

Of the eight writers, the first two were from the Tang dynasty, and the other six from the Song. Three of them were from the same family: Su Xun (father), Su Shi (elder brother) and Su Zhe (younger brother).

In terms of prose, Han Yu and Liu Zongyuan were stylistic innovators. Responding against the florid and tightly restricted pianwen prose form, which had become de rigueur since the Han dynasty, they promoted and wrote essays in a more direct, colloquial style which harkened back to more ancient Chinese prose;as a result, this literary movement was known as the Classical Prose Movement. While the movement would wane in the late Tang, Ouyang Xiu became another proponent in the Song dynasty, revitalizing the prose genre that would predominate the literary scene until the late Qing.

One of the Song masters, Su Xun, once offered an interesting analogy regarding the styles of Han Yu and Ouyang Xiu. He compared Han Yu's prose to the Yangzi River—vast, powerful, and rich with sea monsters and dragons that remain partially concealed, evoking awe and fear. In contrast, Su likened Ouyang Xiu's writing to a meandering stream: fluid, ample, and intricate in form, yet clear in logic and easy in tone. Even at its most intense, Ouyang's prose remains unforced and graceful.

== The six Song masters ==
The six Song masters lived through the 11th and 12th centuries in the Northern Song dynasty and had close interactions with one another.

Ouyang Xiu, the leader of the classical prose movement, was Zeng Gong's teacher and most important patron. Su Xun, Su Shi, and Su Zhe, a family of scholars, were commonly known as the "Three Su." Ouyang Xiu offered his patronage and endorsement to the Three Su, magnified their reputation in the literary circle. Zeng Gong, Su Shi, and Su Zhe passed the imperial examination in 1056, when Ouyang Xiu supervised the exam and shifted the selection criteria in favour of candidates who excelled in classical style prose writing.

Ouyang Xiu initially designated his most accomplished student, Zeng Gong, as his literary successor. However, upon recognizing the exceptional talent of Su Shi, he ultimately passed the torch to him instead. Su Shi, along with his contemporaries Zeng Gong, Sima Guang, and Wang Anshi, elevated the classical prose movement to its peak.

On the political scene, Wang Anshi and Su Shi were once rivals in scholarly ideology and in policies, as Wang Anshi and his followers advanced reform initiatives at court. The outspoken Su Shi was hit hard by the political storm, resulting in years of exile and political persecution. However, after Wang Anshi withdrew from the center of political upheavals, he and Su Shi reconciled, restoring their friendship as scholars and writers.

== Bibliography ==
- Egan, Ronald (2010). "The Northern Song (1020–1126)". In Owen, Stephen (ed.). The Cambridge history of Chinese literature. Vol. 1. Cambridge: Cambridge university press. ISBN 9780521855587.
- Owen, Stephen (2010). "The cultural Tang (650–1020)". In Owen, Stephen (ed.). The Cambridge History of Chinese Literature. Vol. 1. Cambridge: Cambridge University Press. pp. 286–380. ISBN 9780521855587.
- Sun, Wang; Chang, Guowu, eds. (1996). 宋代文学史- 上 [History of Song Literature] (in Chinese). Vol. I. Beijing: Renminwenxue Chubanshe. ISBN 7-02-002118-2.
- Wang, Shuizhao (2000). 王水照自选集 - 曾巩的历史命运 [Self-Selected Anthology of Wang Shuizhao - An analysis of Zeng Gong's position in history] (in Chinese) (1st ed.). Shanghai, China: Shanghai jiaoyu chubanshe. pp. 506–513.
- Zhang, Xuezhong, ed. (2019). Tang Song Badajia Wen Guanzhi 唐宋八大家文观止 [Selected and Annotated works of the Eight Masters of the Tang and Song] (in Chinese). Xi'an: Shanxi renmin jiaoyu chubanshe. ISBN 978-7-5450-6404-9.
- Zhu, Gang; Wang, Shuizhao (2004). Su Shi Ping Zhuan 苏轼评传 [Su Shi, a Critical Biography] (in Chinese). Nanjing, China: Nanjing University Publishing House. ISBN 9787305041525.
