= Zeng Gong =

Chinese historian, poet, politician, and writer (1019–1083)

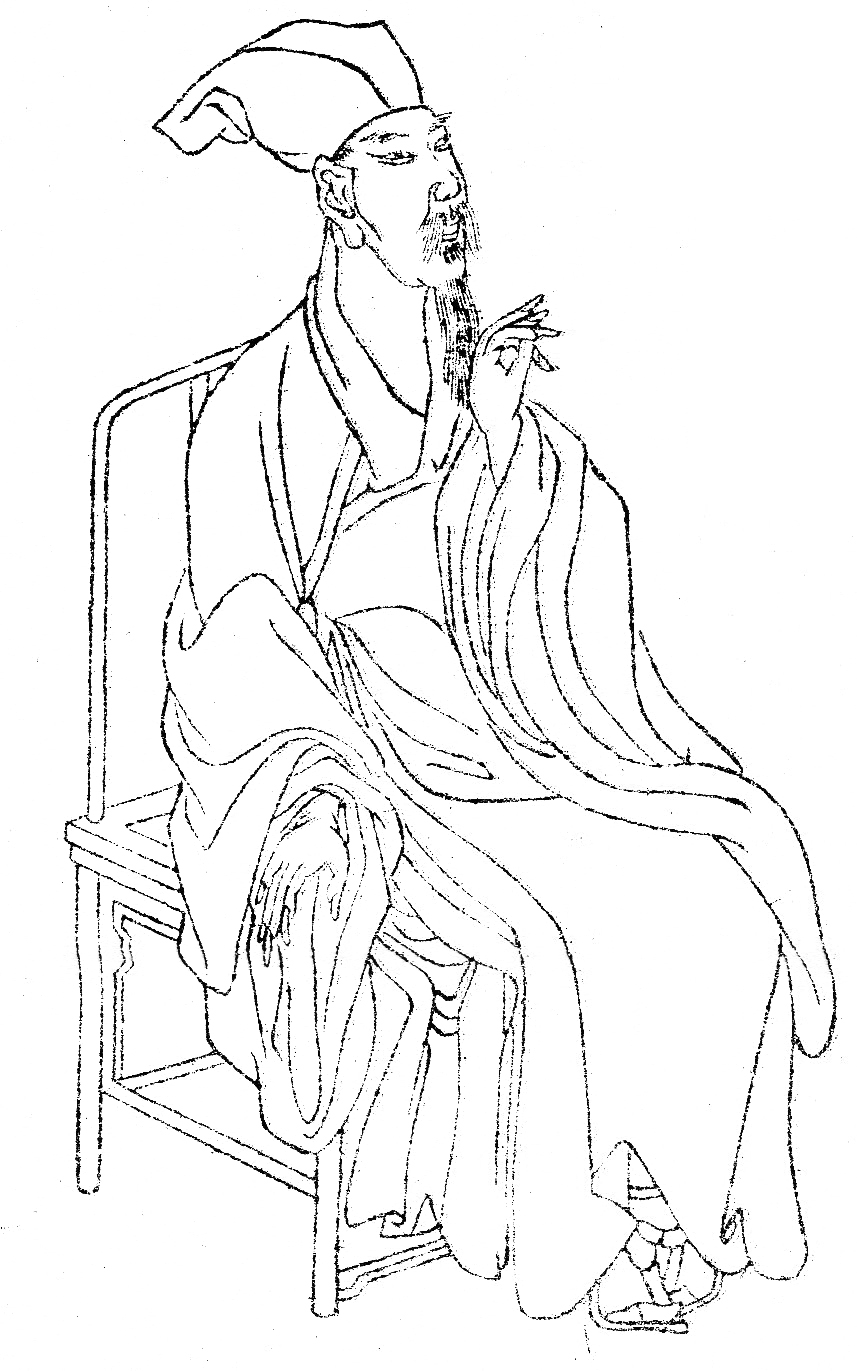
- Portrait of Zeng Gong from the Wanxiaotang Portraits (18th century)
- Born: 30 September 1019 (25th day of the 8th month, third year of Tianxi); Nanfeng, Jiangxi Province
- Died: 30 April 1083 (11th day of the 4th month, sixth year of Yuanfeng); Nanjing, Jiangsu Province
- Known for: Essayist, historian, poet, politician, writer

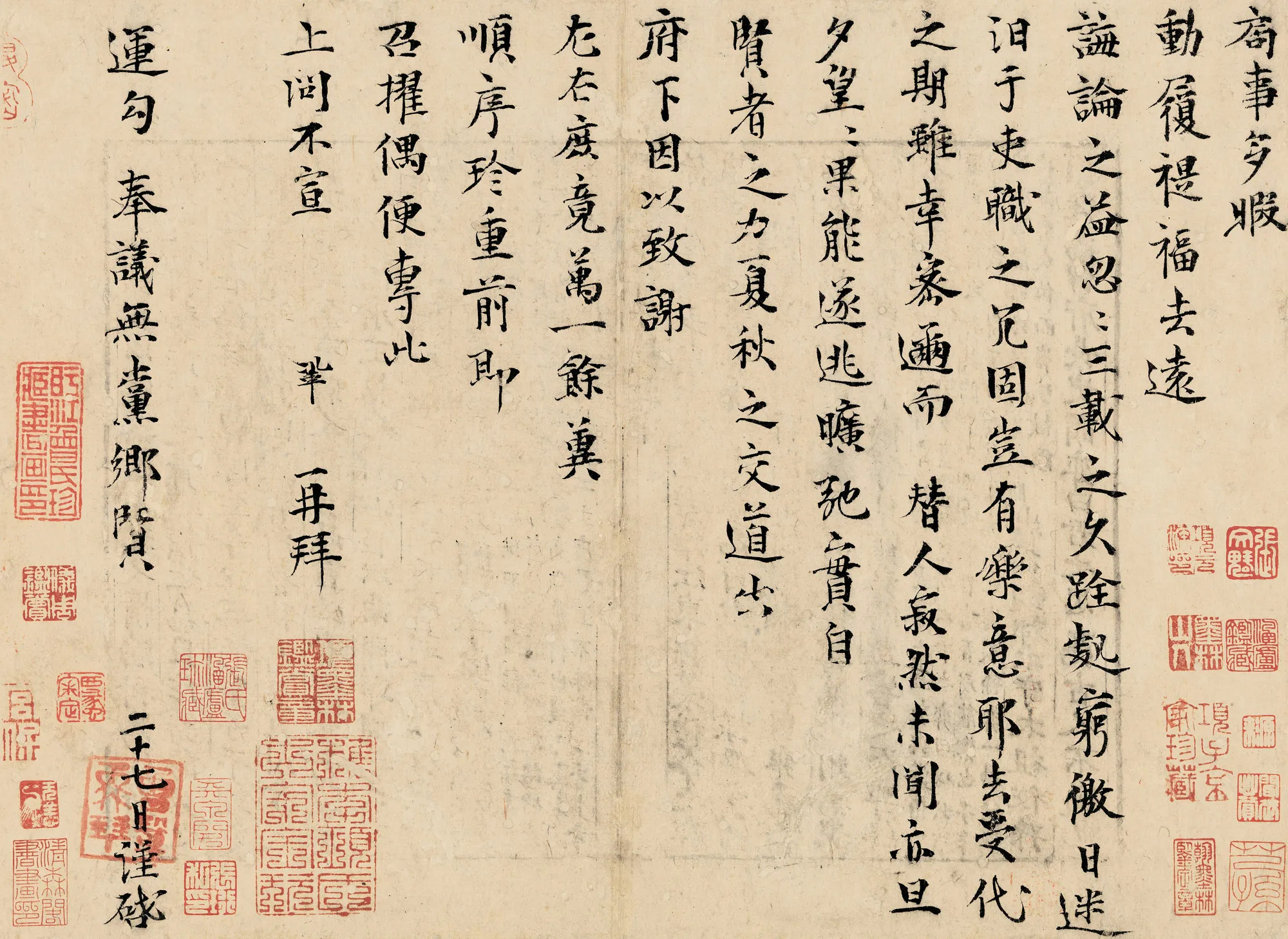
Letter to a friend written by Zeng Gong, which sold at auction in 2016 for more than US$30 million

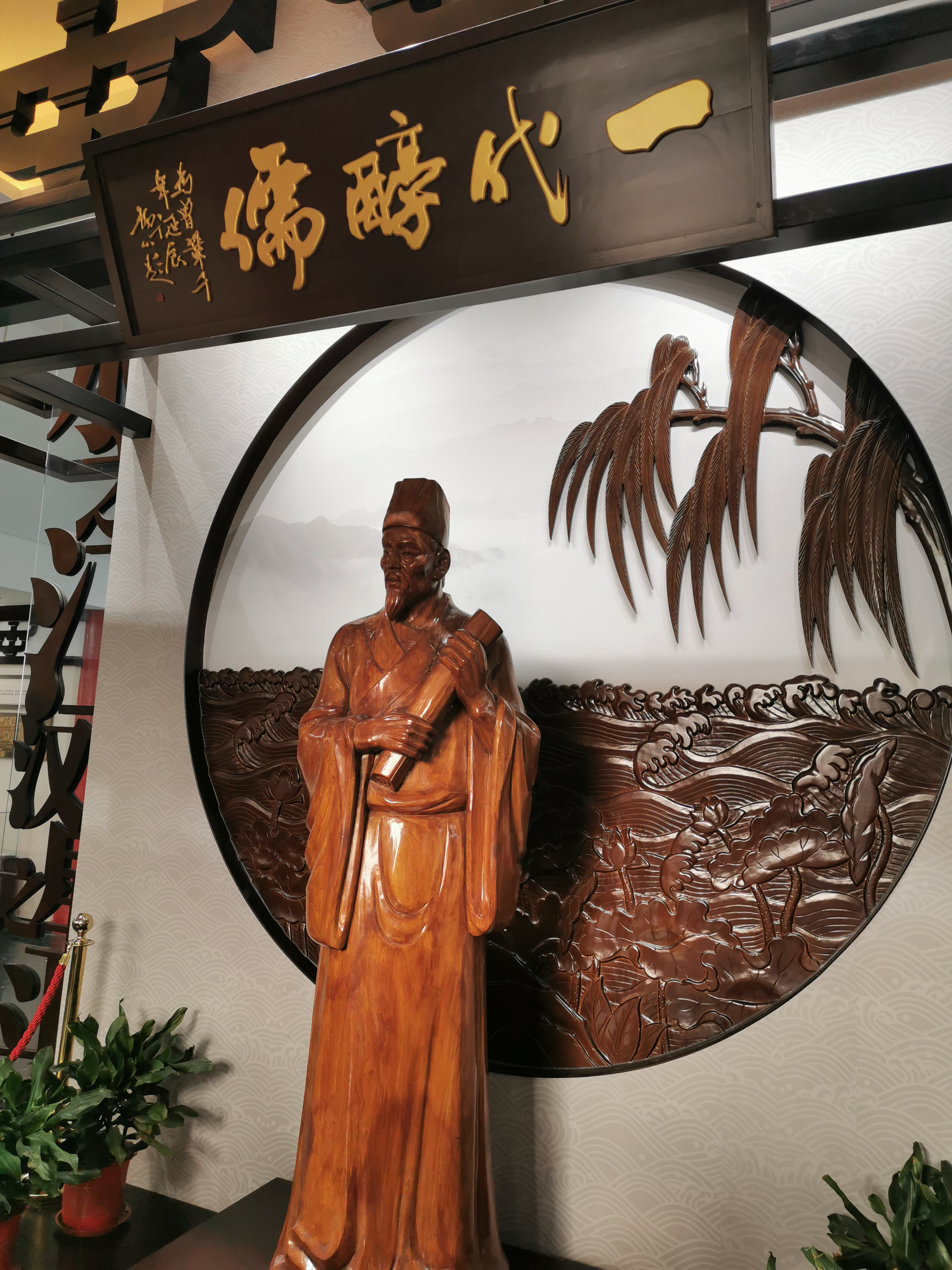
Statue of Zeng Gong in Daming Lake, Jinan

Zeng Gong (Chinese: 曾鞏; pinyin: Zēng Gǒng; 1019–1083), courtesy name Zigu (子固), was a Chinese essayist, historian, poet, and politician of the Song dynasty. He was a key supporter and writer in the Classical Prose Movement and is regarded by later scholars as one of the Eight Great Prose Masters of the Tang and Song. Zeng was the most notable protégé of Ouyang Xiu, the intellectual and literary leader in the Classic Prose Movement.

== Family and early life ==
Zeng Gong was born in Nanfeng, Jianchang (modern Fuzhou, Jiangxi) to a scholarly family. He was a quick learner, read extensively, and was capable of analytical writings at age of twelve. By adulthood, he was widely recognized by his contemporaries. Ouyang Xiu, one of the intellectual leaders of the era, marveled at his essays.

In 1037, at the age of eighteen, he moved to Yushan county (玉山縣, in modern Shangrao, Jiangxi) to accompany his father Zeng Yizhan (曾易占), who had been appointed magistrate there. Whilst in Yushan, he travelled extensively in its hinterlands and wrote a piece of travelogue titled You Xinzhou Yushan Xiaoyan Ji (遊信州玉山小岩記). The essay was divided into five sections. The first describes the geography of Yushan, followed by sections on the caves, rocks etc. Zeng's youthful descriptions show his vivid imagination and literary talent. In his twenties, Zeng Gong traveled throughout China, befriending the would be reformer Wang Anshi and later recommending him to Ouyang Xiu.

== Official career ==
In 1057, Zeng Gong achieved a degree in jinshi together with fellow candidates Su Shi and Su Zhe, and was appointed to a military post in the provinces. The next year, he was recalled to the capital and served in the Department of History - collecting and drafting documents. From 1069, he was appointed successively as the magistrate of Qizhou (齊州), Xiangzhou (襄州), Hongzhou, Fuzhou, Mingzhou (明州) and Bozhou.

Zeng turned out to be an efficient, capable, and diplomatic local governor. While in Yuezhou, he discovered an unjust taxation system, promptly abolished it, and organized famine relief efforts. In Qizhou, he cracked down on criminal activities, particularly organized gangs, robbery, and theft. He implemented harsh penalties and established neighborhood watches to combat crime. As a result, local security improved so significantly that residents no longer needed to lock their doors at night.

In 1080, en route to a fresh appointment in Cangzhou, Zeng was granted an audience with Emperor Shenzong. The emperor was suitably impressed and allowed Zeng to stay at the capital to work on a history of the Five Dynasties period. Zeng Gong was promoted to become Aide to the Master of Writings (中書舍人) in 1082. He died the following year in Jiangning. The new monarch Emperor Lizong granted him the posthumous appellation of "Wending" (文定).

== Works ==
Zeng Gong produced four hundred poems in his lifetime and a number of essays. His style of prose writing is mostly discursive rather than argumentative. Among Zeng Gong's collected works are fifty chapters of Yuanfeng Leigao (元豐類稿), forty chapters of the Xu Yuanfeng Leigao (續元豐類稿) and thirty chapters of the Longping Ji (隆平集). Same as his mentor Ouyang Xiu, Zeng believed that prose writing shall draw inspiration from the ancient sages, as preserved in the Six Classics. His prose was precisely structured, evenly paced, and characterized by crisp expression and clear thinking. Although his works may lack the innovations and vivid imagery found in the works of Han Yu, Liu Zongyuan, Ouyang Xiu, and Su Shi, He stood out for his refined techniques, accessible language, and steadfast adherence to Confucian principles. For this reason, Zeng was favored by the school of Neo-Confucianism and the Tongcheng School.

While Zeng's achievement in literature is often overshadowed by his mentor Ouyang Xiu and his younger fellow Su Shi, he was a highly esteemed figure in his own time and in later dynasties. Ouyang Xiu regarded Zeng as his most outstanding protégé among thousands. Wang Anshi remarked that Zeng's prose had no rival in his literary circles. Su Shi praised Zeng as Ouyang Xiu's most exceptional student. Zeng Gong's writing style and techniques were embraced by Zhu Xi in the southern Song dynasty, as well as prose maters of the Ming and Qing dynasties.

In May 2016 a calligraphy letter by Zeng sold for ¥207 million at an auction, setting a new price record for a Chinese calligraphy work.

== Bibliography ==
- Zhang, Longxi (2023). A History of Chinese Literature. London: Routledge. ISBN 978-1-003-16417-3.
- Zhang, Xuezhong, ed. (2019). 唐宋八大家文观止(Tang Song Badajia Wen Guanzhi) [Selected and Annotated works of the Eight Masters of the Tang and Song] (in Chinese). Xi'an: Shanxi renmin jiaoyu chubanshe. ISBN 978-7-5450-6404-9.
- Zhang, Yi (2003). Luo, Zongqiang; Chen, Hong (eds.). 中国古代文学发展史 - 中 (Zhongguo gu dai wen xue fa zhan shi) (1st ed.). Tianjin: Nan kai da xue chubanshe. ISBN 7-310-01915-6.
