= Chen Weisong =

Qing dynasty poet

字其年，号迦陵 Chen Weisong
- 陈维崧
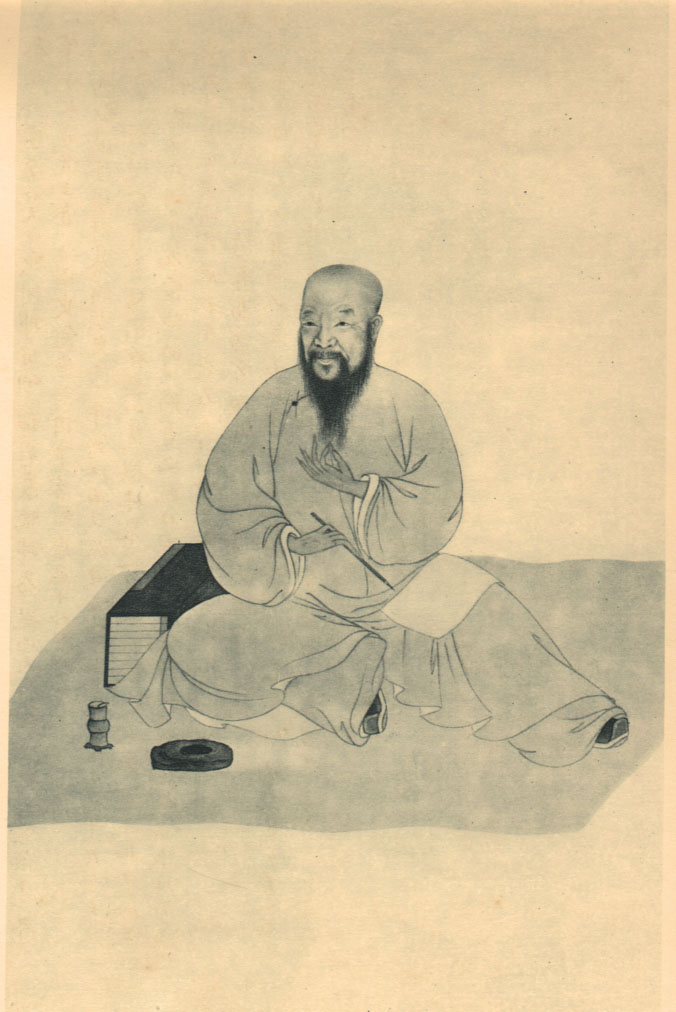
- Portrait from Qing dynasty (《清代學者象傳》)
- Born: 1626 January 7 Jiangsu
- Died: 1682 June 13
- Occupation: poet
- Years active: 1626-1682
- Era: Ming dynasty, Qing dynasty
- Known for: Pianwen, Ci
- Father: Chen Zhenhui

Chen Weisong (traditional Chinese: 陳維崧; simplified Chinese: 陈维崧), also called Chen Qinian (其年) or Chen Jialing (迦陵), lived 1626 January 7－1682 June 13, was the first of the great Ci and Pianwen poets during the Qing dynasty. He was the leader and founder of the Yangxian poetry school (阳羡词派).

== Life ==
Chen Weisong was born to Ming dynasty prince Chen Zhenhui (陈贞慧) in Yixing, Jiangsu. Chen's ancestor Chen Yuting (陈于廷) was a Ming dynasty royal court official (左都御史). Growing up, Chen had a long beard or ran, so he was sometimes called Chen Ran (traditional Chinese: 陳髯; simplified Chinese: 陈髯).

He grew up healthy with a talent in literature and writing. He ranked first in the Yangxian poetry test / competition and was friends with Wu Weiye, Maoxiang, Gong Dingzi, Jiang Chenying, Shao Changheng, Peng Sundi and others. Together with Wu Zhaoqian and Peng Shidu, he was praised by Wu Weiye as "Three Phoenix in Jiang Zuo" (江左三凤). Together with Wu Qi and Zhang Zaogong, they are called "three pianwen geniuses" (駢體三家/骈体三家；pianwen is a form of Chinese poem). When the Ming was replaced by the Qing, Chen took the Imperial examination (科舉/科举) to become a government bureaucrat, but then later changed his mind to pursue a life as a poet.

In November 1658, he visited Maoxiang, studied in Shencui Room in Shuihua Temple, and met Yunlang (Xu Ziyun).

In the spring 1662, he went to Yangzhou and alongside writers Wang Shizhen and Zhang Yangzhong helped repair the Xihong Bridge. In 1709, he participated in the "Erudite Great Poetry Competition" (博學宏辭科/博学宏辞科) and was awarded by the official Hanlin Academy (翰林院) for his works.

In 1682, Chen had a headache for more than 40 days and then died, aged 58. His friend Jiang Jingqi (traditional Chinese: 蔣景祁; simplified Chinese: 蒋景祁) mourned and wrote:

'This grief is hard to overcome. It is impossible to forget the tomb of this great hero. The spirit is now like frozen drum strings.'

== Poems ==
Chen was a prolific poet, writing around 460 poems and 1,629 songs on a variety of topics. He was the first great Ci poets during Qing dynasty and considered one of the greatest poets in Chinese history. His works include:

- 《湖海楼全集》五十卷、
- 《湖海楼诗集》八卷、
- 《陈迦陵文集》十六卷、(Chen Jialing compilation)
- 《陈迦陵词集》三十卷、
- 《陈检讨四六文集》二十卷、
- 《乌丝词》四卷、
- 《两晋南北史集珍》六卷等。
- 《今词选》cowritten with Pan Mei (潘眉)

It was said of Chen that:

“填词之富，古今无两” (The richness of Chen's poems is second to none from past to present).

According to Qian Zhonglian (zh:钱仲联), among 1944 Ci poems compiled over China's history, Chen Weisong's poems stand out as the richest. Today he is recognized as one of the first great Ci poets during the Ming-Qing Transition and one of the greatest poets in Chinese history.

== Friends and family ==
Even though Chen Weisong married and had children (sons and daughters) with wives and concubines, his deepest relationship was with boy-actor Yun Lang (traditional Chinese: 雲郎; simplified Chinese: 云郎), also known as Xu Ziyun (traditional Chinese: 徐紫雲; simplified Chinese: 徐紫云). The relationship was famous among their contemporaries, and is also of interest among modern scholars studying sexuality in late imperial China.

Chen wrote many poems with, and about, Yun Lang. For example, on Yun Lang's wedding day, which was arranged by Chen, he wrote:

"Six years we have shared life in this lonely world
I’ll never forget how,
Beside a pillow of red shrub flowers,
Your tears fell tenderly.
Your wedding completed,
May you live in conjugal bliss.
And please perform your best
At being a good husband.
Sorrowfully, my inner quilt as cold as iron,
I reach for the mahogany panpipe
With no hope of catching the light of daybreak through the windows.
Please don’t worry that I suffer this deep grief."

Despite the dejected spirit of the poem, there is no evidence that Chen's relationship with Yun underwent any change after the wedding; later poems and biographical accounts indicate that they kept their status as each other's primary partner until the younger man's death in 1675.

An artist by the name of Chen Hu also painted a portrait of Yun after a bath; the picture was so famous during the Qing dynasty, that a publication was released containing about 160 poems taking inspiration from the work and celebrating the young man and his relationship with Chen; the poems were composed by almost eighty literary celebrities and officials of the time, including Gong Dingzi, Song Wan, and You Tong.

== Sources ==
- Wu, Cuncun (2004). Homoerotic Sensibilities in Late Imperial China. RoutledgeCurzon. ISBN 0-203-69260-8.
- Volpp, Sophie (2002). "The Literary Circulation of Actors in Seventeenth-Century China". Journal of Asian Studies. 61 (3): 949–984. doi:10.2307/3096352. JSTOR 3096352.
- Hummel, Arthur W. Sr., ed. (1943). "Ch'ên Wei-sung" . Eminent Chinese of the Ch'ing Period. United States Government Printing Office.

== Reading ==
- 叶嘉莹：〈陈维崧词平议〉。
- 叶嘉莹：〈陈维崧词讲稿之一：从云间到阳羡词风的转变〉。
- 錢仲聯：〈論陳維崧的湖海樓詞〉
- 歐明俊 (2001):《豪放詞三百首》成都：巴蜀書社
- 学术论文内容来自 周绚隆. 论陈维崧以诗为词的创作特征及其意义． 《 CNKI;WanFang 》 ， 2004
- 周绚隆. 实用性原则的遵循与背叛—陈维崧题画词的文本解读． 《 首都师范大学学报(社会科学版) 》 ， 2000
- 周绚隆. 论迦陵词以文为词的倾向—兼评陈维崧革新词体的得失 On the Inclination of using Prose Skills to Write Ci in Jialing's． 《 VIP 》 ， 2002
- 刘明玉. 近25年来陈维崧词研究的回顾与展望——兼谈文体功能研究的重要意义． 《 CNKI;WanFang 》 ， 2007
- 梁鉴江. 诗史与词史——浅谈杜诗对陈维崧词的影响． 《 CNKI 》 ， 2001

== Portrait ==
- Portrait is from 《清代學者象傳》
