= Tengwang Ge Xu =

Chinese prose written in 675 by Wang Bo

- Traditional Chinese: 滕王閣序
- Simplified Chinese: 滕王阁序
- Literal meaning: Teng Prince's Pavilion Preface
Transcriptions
Standard Mandarin
- Hanyu Pinyin: Téngwáng Gé Xù
Yue: Cantonese
- Jyutping: Tang^{4} Wong^{4} Gok^{3} Zeoi^{6}

Alternative Chinese name
- Traditional Chinese: 秋日登洪府滕王閣餞別序
- Simplified Chinese: 秋日登洪府滕王阁饯别序
- Literal meaning: Autumn Day Ascend Hongzhou City's Teng Prince's Pavilion Farewell Feast Preface
Transcriptions
Standard Mandarin
- Hanyu Pinyin: Qiūrì Dēng Hóng Fǔ Téngwáng Gé Jiànbié Xù
Yue: Cantonese
- Jyutping: Cau^{1} Jat^{6} Dang^{1} Hung^{4} Fu^{2} Tang^{4} Wong^{4} Gok^{3} Zin^{3} Bit^{6} Zeoi^{6}

Tengwang Ge Xu (Chinese: 滕王閣序; pinyin: Téngwáng Gé Xù, Preface to the Prince Teng's Pavilion), full name Preface to a Farewell Feast Atop the Prince Teng's Pavilion in Autumn (Chinese: 秋日登洪府滕王閣餞別序; pinyin: Qiūrì Dēng Hóng Fǔ Téngwáng Gé Jiànbié Xù) or Preface to Poems on the Prince of Teng's Pavilion (Chinese: 滕王閣詩序; pinyin: Téngwáng Gé Shī Xù), is a masterpiece of parallel prose by Wang Bo of the Tang dynasty. Some of the lines in this preface are widely known among the Chinese readers, such as “The glowing clouds at sunset fly away with a lonely egret; The autumnal waters merge with the broad sky in one fading color.”

It is classified as pianwen (Chinese: 駢文; pinyin: Piánwén), which depends greatly on rhythm, somewhat like classical Chinese poetry, but does not have a restriction of how many characters should be in one sentence, and how many sentences in one paragraph. It is named after Pavilion of Prince Teng, a pavilion standing by the Gan River of Nanchang City, which was then called Hongzhou (Chinese: 洪州; pinyin: Hóngzhou) and is the capital of the current province of Jiangxi. It was first built in the early Tang dynasty.

Wang Bo was on his way to Jiaozhi County, in present-day northern Vietnam, visiting his father, and encountered a grand banquet held there. It is acknowledged that he actually finished the work at the banquet. The author expressed his sadness at being unable to make use of his talent. In fact, he was drowned in the South China Sea not long after he finished this classic before he reached Vietnam to see his father.

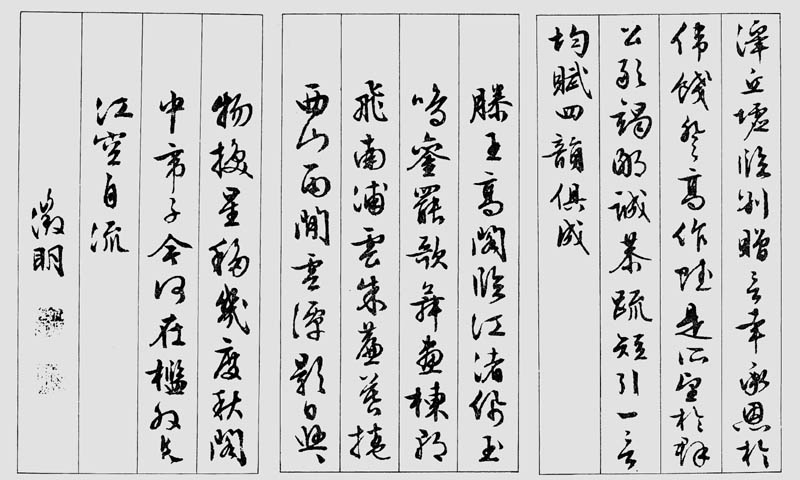
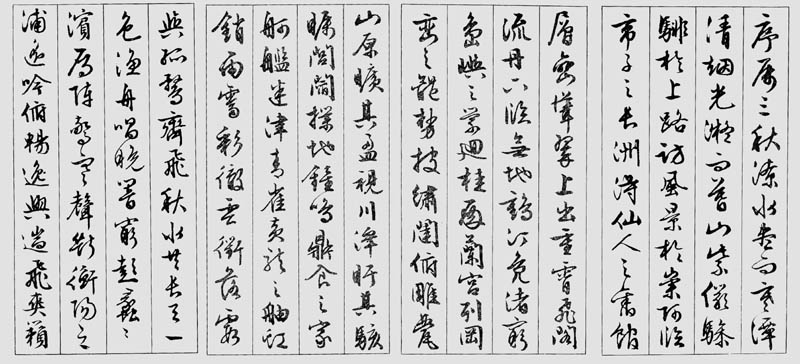
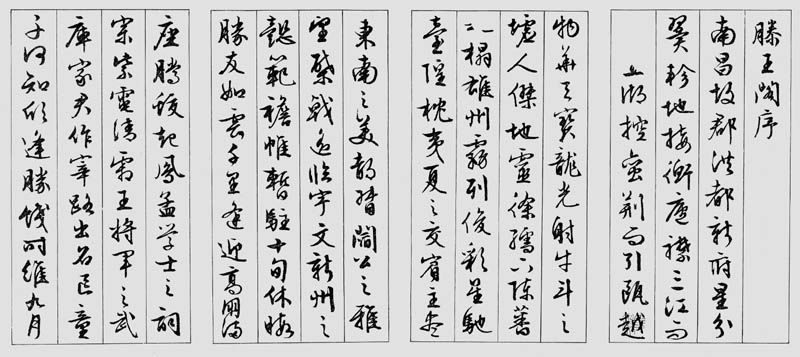
...
Wen Zhengming's calligraphy of Tengwang Ge Xu
