= Classical Prose Movement =

Literary movement in Tang and Song dynasty China

The Classical Prose Movement (Chinese: 古文運動; pinyin: gǔwén yùndòng), which emerged during Tang dynasty and the Song dynasty in China, advocated for clarity and precision in writing, as opposed to the florid pianwen (駢體文) or parallel prose style that had dominated since the Han dynasty. Parallel prose, characterized by rigid structure and use of rare words allusions to literary works or historical events, was criticized for prioritizing form over substance. The movement sought to revive the spirit of pre-Han prose, emphasizing effective communication and argumentation over rhetorical flourish.

The movement gained momentum in the ninth century under Han Yu and Liu Zongyuan, who championed prose as a vehicle for expressing Confucian ideals and addressing contemporary political and social issues. They promoted a writing style that was direct, expressive, and rooted in classical texts, while also incorporating elements of colloquial language for accessibility. Although the movement briefly declined in the late Tang, it was revitalized in the Song dynasty by reform-minded scholar-officials such as Fan Zhongyan, Ouyang Xiu, and Su Shi. Their efforts reinforced the role of classical prose in statecraft and Confucian education, influencing the civil service examinations and shaping literary traditions that persisted until the Qing dynasty.

The movement also had political and religious dimensions, as Confucian scholars tried to combat the influence of Taoism and Buddhism at the imperial court and among the commoners. Some reformers used classical prose as a tool to expose corruption and advocate for administrative improvements. The most distinguished writers of the Classical Prose Movement became known as the Eight Masters of the Tang and Song, whose works left a lasting impact on Chinese literary history.

== Tang Dynasty ==
Parallel prose initiated in the Pre-Qin era, flourished during the Southern and Northern dynasties, and reached its peak in the early Tang dynasty. However, the excessive elaboration of its rules, vocabulary, and allusions became a hindrance to effective communication. Therefore, classical prose in a less restrained format became high in demand.

Another motivation for writing style revolution was triggered by the social-political turmoil following the An Lushan Rebellion. Reform-minded literati-officials seek to repair and renew the empire that suffered multiple crises including a weak central government plagued by regional warlords, corrupt bureaucrats, poverty among the commoners, as well prevalent practice of Buddhism and Taoism, which they opposed as Confucian scholars, giving arguments from political economy in support. They believe that the tool of revival was the knowledge and practical application of classical Confucian ideology, with prose writing serving as the vehicle for the reformist message.

The first distinguished stylists of the movement were Han Yu and Liu Zongyuan of the ninth-century, who were not only accomplished writers but also eminent theorists, providing the foundation of the movement. Han Yu and Liu Zongyuan established several principles for prose writing. They believed that prose writing should serve as a vehicle for expressing ideas and arguments effectively, rather than merely showcasing rhetorical skill. Additionally, they encouraged writers to study the classics extensively, not only the Confucian classics but also literary texts from other philosophers and authors, to enrich their content and form. While they valued the study of classical works, they also emphasized the importance of innovation, advising against mechanical imitation of the classics. Furthermore, they believed that authors should cultivate their inner selves, allowing their writings to be infused with character and emotion.

Han Yu and Liu Zongyuan were prolific prose writers who collectively produced around 800 works spanning a wide range of genres, including political essays, letters, petitions, prefaces, biographies, eulogies, epitaphs, fables, travelogues, and novellas. Han Yu's prose works feature innovative vocabulary, concise and vivid expressions, sharp commentary, and compelling arguments. His writing is rich with emotion and personal characters, flowing like rushing rapids. Liu Zongyuan was best known for his landscape travelogues, in which he rediscovered natural scenery overlooked by the masses. Through his poetic lens, ordinary landscapes were reimagined and transformed by his expressive writing.

After the deaths of Han Yu and Liu Zongyuan, the Classical Prose Movement experienced a decline. Some of their students adopted archaic language that hindered comprehension, while others neglected the importance of crafting well-structured essays. By the late Tang dynasty, the reformist spirit had diminished among scholars, and pianwen (parallel prose) regained prominence as the predominant literary style.

Furthermore, the government only allowed the use of pianwen for official use, so those who want to be officials had to learn that style.

== Song dynasty ==
The theme was revisited by Song dynasty scholar official Fan Zhongyan, as part of the political and social reform initiatives he advocated for. The Confucian reformers held that prose writing, particularly writings required for civil service examinations, shall focus on statecraft and Confucian Classics, instead of euphonious composition. Fan's promotion of the "ancient style" served both political and ethical grounds, as he believed scholar officials with moral cultivation and administrative skills will improve government efficiency and commoner's lives. As such, the lettered class shall shift their focus from floridity to the substance of what they write.

Ouyang Xiu, a younger associate and avid follower of Fan Zhongyan, developed into a literary giant and leader in reviving the ancient style. Ouyang and his literary friends carried over the spirit of classical prose to poetry, and further to a larger effort to reform writing and learning in general, so that writing would be a vehicle for purpose and reflection, rather than a display of talent. Ouyang followed the Tang pioneers Han Yu and Liu Zongyuan for their "talents" and "natural flow" in prose writing, but skipped the "obscure" and "strange" elements contained in their prose work.

In his own unofficial writing practice of letters, prefaces, accounts, and grave inscriptions, Ouyang "cultivated a highly personal tone" and incorporated an extensive range of "subjects, moods, and themes". To "write naturally" was a piece of advice he offered to younger writers, and the principle he followed through in his prose creation.

As a policy maker, Ouyang was well known for his directives in the 1057 imperial examination, where candidates writing in the ancient prose style were selected over candidates using the euphuistic or Imperial Academy style. Several of the passing candidates would turn into prominent literary figures, including Su Shi, Su Xun, and Zeng Gong. Ouyang's advocacy and writing not only revitalized classic prose but also provided enduring momentum for the movement's continuation.

Ouyang, together with his literary friends and followers, built upon Tang's classic prose movement while incorporating the aesthetics and rhythms of pianwen. The three key functions of prose—argument, narration, and lyricism—were combined by Song dynasty prose writers, led by Ouyang Xiu and Su Shi. In this time, Song prose placed more value on the "concise" and "natural", and became more accessible to readers from a wider range of social backgrounds. The classic prose format established during the Song dynasty dominated the literary scene until the Qing dynasty.

== See also ==
- Chinese literature
- Eight Masters of the Tang and Song

== Bibliography ==
- Egan, Ronald (2010). "The Northern Song (1020–1126)". In Owen, Stephen (ed.). The Cambridge history of Chinese literature. Vol. 1. Cambridge: Cambridge university press. ISBN 9780521855587.
- Mo, Lifeng; Huang, Tianji; Yuan, Xingpei, eds. (1999). 中国文学史 第三卷 [History of Chinese Literature] (in Chinese). Vol. III. Beijing: Higher Education Press. ISBN 7-04-006387-5.
- Owen, Stephen (2010). "The Cultural Tang(650–1020)". In Owen, Stephen (ed.). The Cambridge history of Chinese literature. Vol. 1. Cambridge: Cambridge university press. ISBN 9780521855587.
- Yuan, Xingpei; Luo, Zongqiang, eds. (1999). 中国文学史 第二卷 [History of Chinese Literature] (in Chinese). Vol. II. Beijing: Higher Education Press. ISBN 7-04-006387-5.
- Zhang, Longxi (2023). A History of Chinese Literature. London: Routledge. ISBN 978-1-003-16417-3.
- Zhang, Yi (2003). Luo, Zongqiang; Chen, Hong (eds.). 中国古代文学发展史 - 中 (Zhongguo gu dai wen xue fa zhan shi) (1st ed.). Tianjin: Nan kai da xue chubanshe. ISBN 7-310-01915-6.
