= Jianzhuke Shu =

The Jianzhuke Shu (simplified Chinese: 谏逐客书; traditional Chinese: 諫逐客書; pinyin: Jiànzhúkè Shū; lit. 'Petition against the Expulsion of Guests') was a petition to Ying Zheng, King of Qin, written by Li Si in 243 BC. Written in response to an order to expel all officers serving in the State of Qin who were not born in Qin, it successfully persuaded Ying Zheng to rescind the expulsion order, and also began Li Si's career as a leading politician in Qin.

== Background ==
During the Warring States period, it was common practice for learned men whose careers might have been frustrated in their homelands to travel to other countries in search of service and patronage. Li Si himself was such an individual, having been born in the State of Chu but unable to progress in an official career there.

The initial policy of openness to outsiders changed in 244 BC, due to the controversy surrounding the Zhengguo Canal; the State of Han had dispatched Zheng Guo, a skilled engineer, to Qin on the pretext of helping them build an irrigation canal. Subsequently, however, it was discovered that this was really a scheme by Han to weaken Qin by diverting its resources towards canal construction. At the instigation of a clique of officials within the Qin court, suspicion soon became widened to include all guest officers from outside Qin, and Ying Zheng issued an order to expel all foreigners.

Li Si, himself a foreigner, was also caught up in the purge; his petition was composed while he was being expelled from Qin.

Ying Zheng finally accepted Li Si's suggestion and withdrew the order. Twenty years later, Ying Zheng unified ancient China and became the first Emperor of China, thus marking the establishment of the unified Qin dynasty.
