= Han Yu =

Ancient Chinese writer, essayist and poet (768–824)

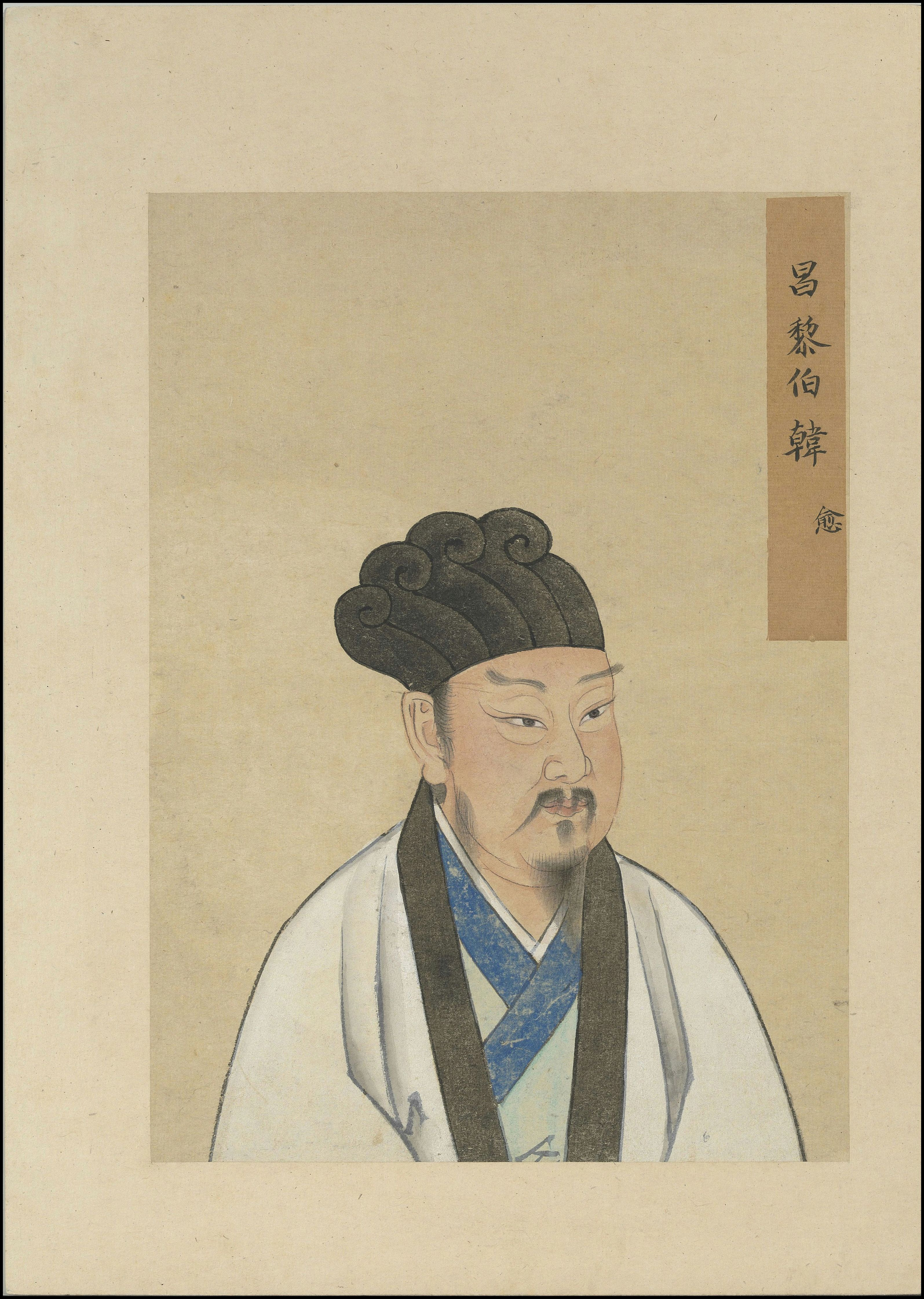
- Yuan dynasty portrait
- Born: 768; Heyang (now Mengzhou, Henan)
- Died: 824 (aged 55–56)
Names
- Family name: Hán 韓 Given name: Yù 愈 Courtesy name: Tuìzhī 退之
Posthumous name
- 韓文公
- Occupation: Essayist, philosopher, poet, politician

Han Yu
- Traditional Chinese: 韓愈
- Simplified Chinese: 韩愈
Transcriptions
Standard Mandarin
- Hanyu Pinyin: Hán Yù
- Gwoyeu Romatzyh: Harn Yuh
- Wade–Giles: Han^{2} Yü^{4}
- IPA: [xǎn ŷ]
Yue: Cantonese
- Yale Romanization: Hòhn Yuh
- Jyutping: Hon^{4} Jyu^{6}
- IPA: [hɔn˩ jy˨]
Southern Min
- Tâi-lô: Hân Jú

Han Yu (Chinese: 韓愈; 768 – 25 December 824), courtesy name Tuizhi (Chinese: 退之), and commonly known by his posthumous name Han Wengong (韓文公), was an essayist, Confucian scholar, poet, and government official during the Tang dynasty who significantly influenced the development of Neo-Confucianism. Described as "comparable in stature to Dante, Shakespeare or Goethe" for his influence on the Chinese literary tradition, Han Yu stood for strong central authority in politics and orthodoxy in cultural matters.

He is often considered to be among China's finest prose writers. Ming dynasty scholar Mao Kun (茅坤) ranked him first among the "Eight Great Prose Masters of the Tang and Song".

== Biography ==
Han Yu was born in 768, in Heyang (河陽, present day Mengzhou) in Henan to a family of noble lineage. His father worked as a minor official but died when Han Yu was two. He was then raised in the family of his older brother, Han Hui (韓會). He was a student of philosophical writings and Confucian thought. His family moved to Chang'an in 774 but was banished to Southern China in 777 because of its association with disgraced minister Yuan Zai. Han Hui died in 781 while serving as a prefect in Guangdong province. In 792, after four attempts, Han Yu passed the jinshi imperial examination. In 796, after failing to secure a position in the civil service at the capital, he went into the service of the provincial military governor of Bianzhou until 799, and then of the military governor of Xuzhou. He gained his first central government position in 802 on the recommendation of the military governor. However, he was soon exiled for several possible reasons: for failing to support the heir apparent's faction, his criticism of the misbehavior of the emperor's servants, or his request for reduction of taxes during a famine.

From 807 to 819 he held a series of government posts, first in Luoyang and then in Chang'an. During these years, he was a strong advocate of reimposing central control over separatist northeastern provinces. This period of service came to an end when he wrote his famous Memorial on Bone-relics of the Buddha (諫迎佛骨表) presented to Emperor Xianzong. The memorial is a strongly worded protest against Buddhist influence on the country. The Emperor, offended by Han Yu's criticism, ordered his execution. He was however saved by his friends at the court, and was thusly demoted and exiled to Chaozhou instead. After Han Yu offered a formal apology to the Emperor a few months later, he was transferred to a province nearer to the capital. Emperor Xianzong died within a year, and his successor Emperor Muzong brought Han Yu back to the capital where he worked in the War Office. He was then appointed to a high-ranking position after he successfully completed a mission to persuade a rebellious military commander to return to the fold.

Han Yu held a number of other distinguished government posts such as the rector of the Imperial university. At the age of fifty-six, Han Yu died in Chang'an on December 25, 824 and was buried on April 21, 825 in the ancestral cemetery at Heyang.

== Thoughts and beliefs ==
Although generally not considered a philosopher, Han Yu was an important Confucian intellectual who influenced later generations of Confucian thinkers and Confucian philosophy. He also sponsored many literary figures of the turn of the ninth century. He led a revolt against pianwen (駢文), a formal, richly ornamented literary style, advocating a return to a classical, simple, logical, and exact style. He felt that this classical style of writing—called guwen (古文), literally, "ancient writing"—would be appropriate for the restoration of Confucianism.

Han Yu promoted Confucianism but was also deeply opposed to Buddhism, a religion that was then popular at the Tang court. In 819, he sent a letter, "Memorial on Bone-relics of the Buddha", to the emperor in which he denounced "the elaborate preparations being made by the state to receive the Buddha's fingerbone, which he called 'a filthy object' and which he said should be 'handed over to the proper officials for destruction by water and fire to eradicate forever its origin'. Han Yu contrasted the Chinese civilization and barbarism where people were "like birds and wild beast or like the barbarians". He considered Buddhism to be of barbarian (夷狄) origin, therefore an unsuitable religion for the Chinese people.

Again from Han Yu's letter, "Memorial on Bone-relics of the Buddha":

"Your servant begs leave to say that Buddhism is no more than a cult of the barbarian peoples which spread to China. It did not exist here in ancient times. Now I hear that Your Majesty has ordered the community of monks to go to greet the finger bone of the Buddha [a relic from India], and that Your Majesty will ascend a tower to watch the procession as this relic is brought into the palace. [...] The Buddha was a man of the barbarians who did not speak Chinese and who wore clothes of a different fashion. The Buddha’s sayings contain nothing about our ancient kings and the Buddha’s manner of dress did not conform to our laws; he understood neither the duties that bind sovereign and subject, not the affections of father and son. If the Buddha were still alive today and came to our court, Your Majesty might condescend to receive him, but he would then be escorted to the borders of the nation, dismissed, and not allowed to delude the masses. How then, when he has long been dead, could the Buddha’s rotten bones, the foul and unlucky remains of his body, be rightly admitted to the palace? Confucius said: “Respect ghosts and spirits, but keep them at a distance!” Your servant is deeply ashamed and begs that this bone from the Buddha be given to the proper authorities to be cast into fire and water, that this evil be rooted out, and later generations spared this delusion."

Han Yu was also critical of Taoism, which he considered to be a harmful accretion to Chinese culture. He nevertheless made the distinction between Taoism, a homegrown religion, and Buddhism, a foreign faith. In "The Origin of Dao" (原道, Yuandao), he argued that the monasticism of both Buddhism and Taoism to be economically nonproductive, creating economic and social dislocation. He also criticized both of these beliefs for being unable to deal with social problems. He considered Confucianism to be distinct from these two beliefs in linking the private, moral life of the individual with the public welfare of the state. He emphasized Mencius's method of assuring public morality and social order, and his concept of the expression of Confucian spirituality through political action would later form the intellectual basis for neo-Confucianism. Han introduced the ideas of the succession of the Way (道統, daotong), as well as the concept of the "teacher" (師, shi) who embodies the Way as expressed in "Discourse on Teachers" (師說, Shishuo). Although Han Yu attacked Buddhism and Taoism, some of his ideas have Buddhist and/or Taoist roots; for example, the succession of the Way was inspired by the Buddhist idea of transmission of the dharma, while his concept of the "teacher" originated from the Buddhist and Taoist idea of religious mentor.

In his "Discourse on Teachers" (師說, Shishuo), Han Yu discussed the necessity and principles of learning from teachers, and criticized the phenomenon of "shame to learn from the teacher" in the society at that time. He stated that "a disciple need not be necessarily inferior to the teacher, [while] the teacher need not be necessarily more virtuous than the disciple. The only fact is that [one may] acquire Dao earlier or later [than the others], [and there may be] specific field that one specialized in."

== Literary works ==
=== Prose ===
Han Yu is often considered the greatest master of classical prose in the Tang. He was listed first among the "Eight Great Prose Masters of the Tang and Song" by Ming Dynasty scholar Mao Kun. Together with Liu Zongyuan he headed the Classical Prose Movement to return to the unornamented prose of the Han Dynasty. He considered the classical "old style prose" (古文, guwen) to be the kind of writing more suited to argumentation and the expression of ideas. Han Yu's guwen however was not an imitation of ancient prose, but a new style based on the ancient ideals of clarity, concision, and utility. Han Yu wrote in many modes, often with discursiveness and daring experimentation.

Among his most renowned essays are his polemics against Buddhism and Taoism and support for Confucianism, such as "Buddhism Memorial on Bone-relics of the Buddha" and "The Origin of Dao". Other notable works include "Text for the Crocodiles" (祭鱷魚文) in which he declares that crocodiles be formally banished from Chaozhou, and "Goodbye to Penury" (送窮文) that describes his failed attempt to rid himself of the ghost of poverty.

=== Poetry ===
Han Yu also wrote poetry. However, while Han Yu's essays are highly regarded, his poetry is not considered exceptional. According to A History of Chinese Literature by Herbert Giles, Han Yu "wrote a large quantity of verse, frequently playful, on an immense variety of subjects, and under his touch the commonplace was often transmuted into wit. Among other pieces there is one on his teeth, which seemed to drop out at regular intervals, so that he could calculate roughly what span of life remained to him. Altogether, his poetry cannot be classed with that of the highest order, unlike his prose writings".

A notable poem of Han Yu is "Losing Teeth" (落齒), where he ruminated on getting old by recounting how he lost his own teeth.

== Significance and assessment ==
Han Yu ranks among the most important personalities in the history of traditional Chinese culture. His works not only become classics in Chinese literature, but his writings redefined and changed the course of the tradition itself. He was a stylistic innovator in the many genres he wrote in, and was a major influence on the literary and intellectual life of his time as well as later dynasties. The writings of Han Yu were influential to Song Dynasty writers and poets, in particular Ouyang Xiu who popularized the use of guwen as advocated by Han Yu, a style that would stay as the model for Chinese prose until the revolution in Chinese literature of modern China. In an inscription for a shrine to Han Yu, Song Dynasty poet Su Shi praised Han Yu:

文起八代之衰，而道濟天下之溺；忠犯人主之怒，而勇奪三軍之帥。
His prose reversed the literary decline of eight dynasties, his teachings aided the misguided throughout the world, his loyalty led him to risk the wrath of his master, his courage surpassed the generals of three armies.

— Su Shi, Inscription on Stele for Han Yu's Temple in Chaozhou

All the major accounts of Han Yu's life agree that he had an open and forthright character, which manifested itself in his unswerving loyalty to his friends. According to Li Ao, Han Yu was a great conversationalist and an inspired teacher: "His teaching and his efforts to mold his students were unrelenting, fearing they would not be perfect. Yet he amused them with jokes and with the chanting of poems, so that they were enraptured with his teaching and forgot about returning home". The sense of humor that is so obvious in his writing was also important in his life. Herbert Giles judged that it was "due to his calm and dignified patriotism that the Chinese still keep his memory green".

Han Yu led a defense of Confucianism at a time when Confucian doctrine was in decline, and attacked both Buddhism and Taoism which were then the dominant belief systems. His writings would have a significant influence on Neo-Confucians of later eras, such as the Song dynasty scholars Cheng Yi and Zhu Xi. Although usually not considered a philosopher, he introduced a new intellectual direction for Confucianism as well as influential ideas to later Confucians. However, he was criticized by Song Confucians for being much more of a stylist than a moralist.

Most modern scholarship, although content to assign to Han Yu a secure place in the history of Chinese literature, has been embarrassed by the violence of his Confucian passions.

== Memorial ==
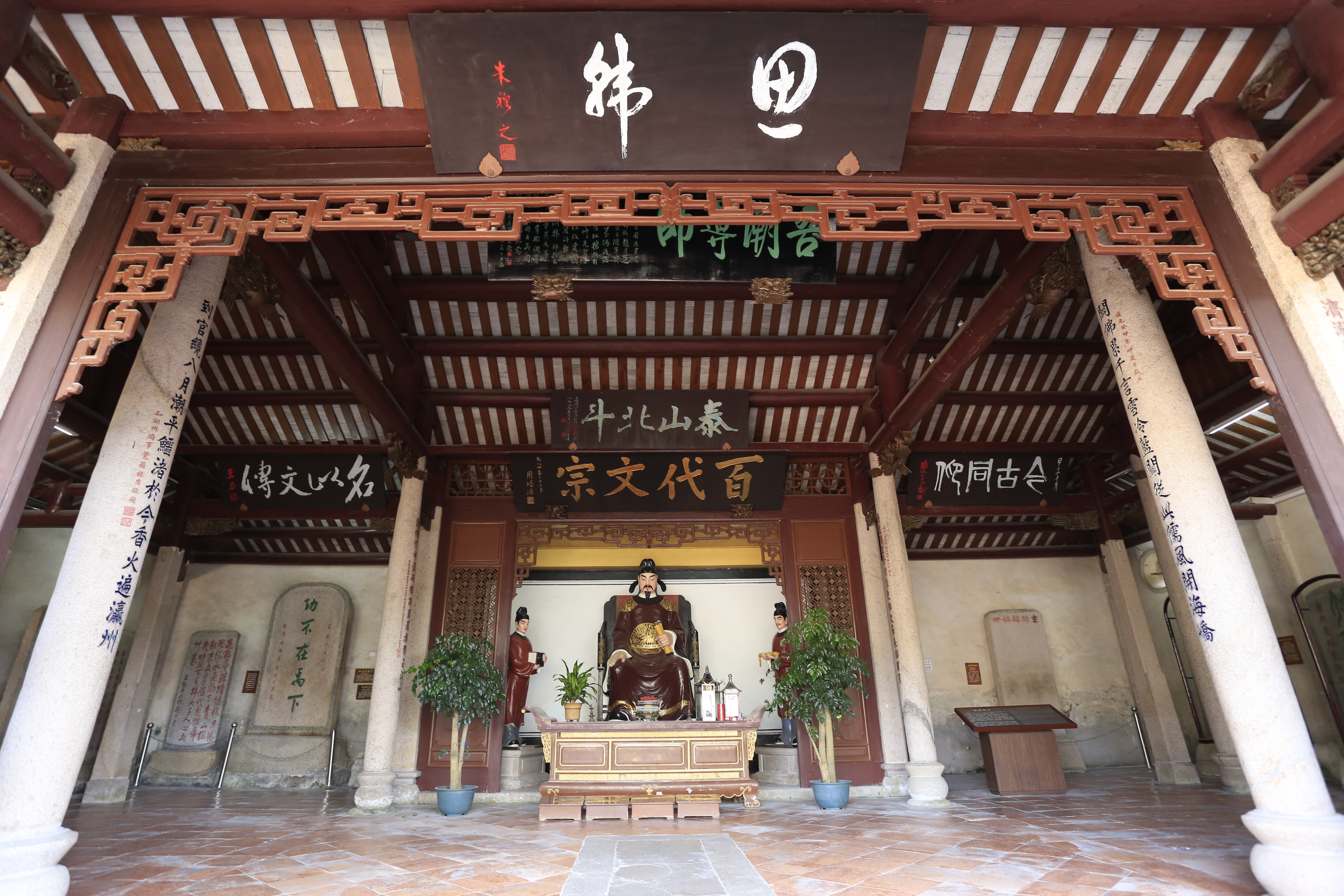
Han Yu's Temple in Chaozhou

In honor of Han's contribution to Chaoshan when he was exiled to Chaozhou, the Han River flowing through Chaozhou is named after him. Han Yu Temple (韓文公祠) in Chaozhou was established since the Song dynasty at the riverside of Mount Han, which also named after him. Due to his dealings with crocodiles in South China, the extinct gharial Hanyusuchus was named after him in 2022.

== Studies ==
Erwin von Zach wrote Han Yüs poetische Werke, a German language study. The Poetry of Meng Chiao and Han Yü, a book by Stephen Owen published by the Yale University Press, was the first substantial English-language study of Han Yu. It was published 13 years after Zach's book.

== Modern references ==
In an essay on Kafka, the Argentinian writer Jorge Luis Borges, in making the argument that "each writer creates his own precursors", placed Han Yu as one of the antecedents of Kafka due to some resemblance between them.

An extinct genus of crocodilian, Hanyusuchus, was named in 2022 after Han Yu in recognition of his essay "Text for the Crocodiles". The crocodilian mentioned in this essay is believed to belong to a newly identified species Hanyusuchus sinensis.

== Descendants ==
Han Yu's descendants held the title of "Wujing boshi" (五經博士; Wǔjīng bóshì).
