= Liu Zongyuan =

Chinese philosopher, poet, and politician (773–819)

Liu Zongyuan 柳宗元
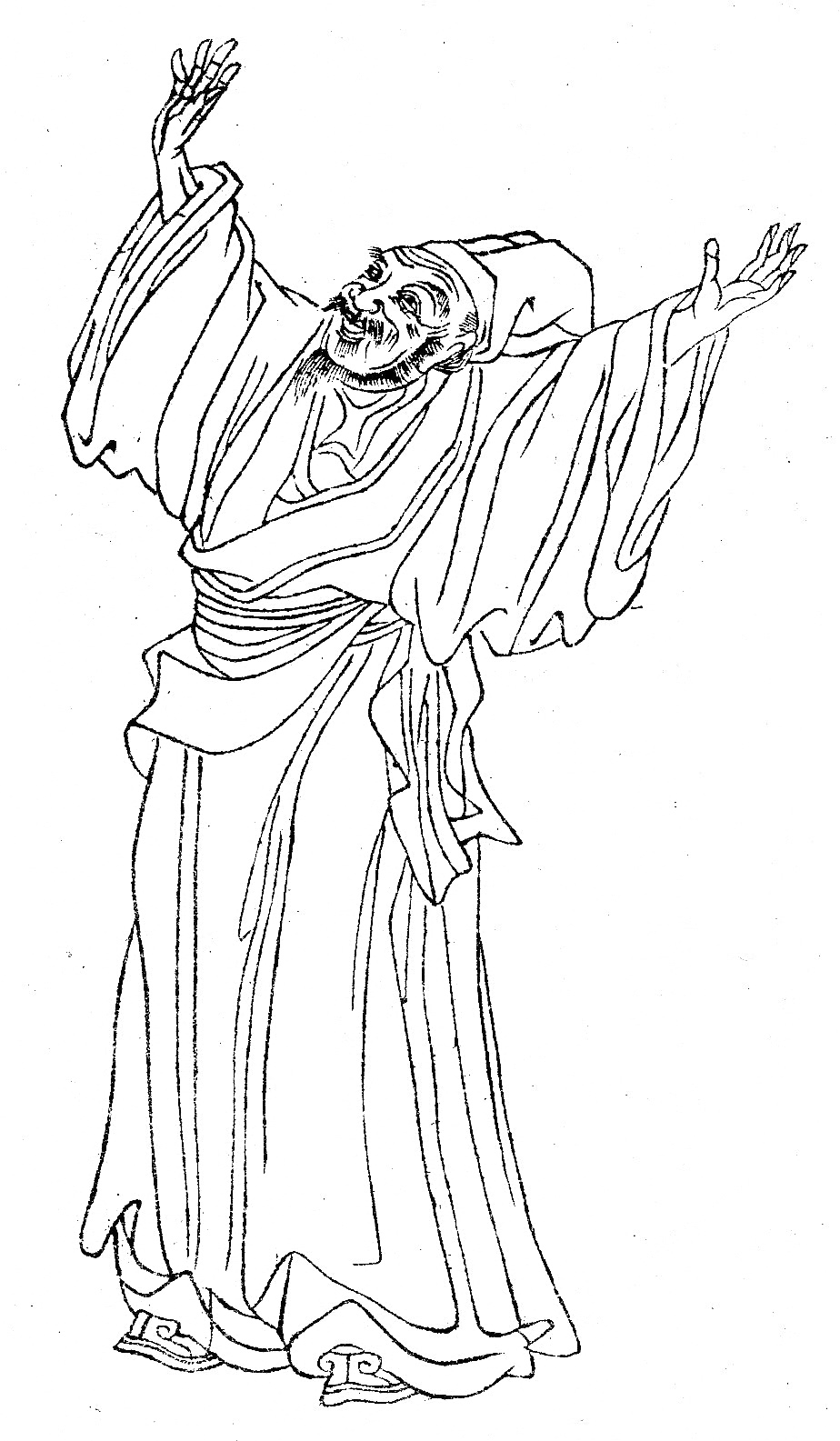
- Born: 773; Chang'an
- Died: November 28, 819 (aged 45–46); Liuzhou, Guangxi
- Occupations: Philosopher, poet, politician

Liu Zongyuan
- Chinese: 柳宗元
Transcriptions
Standard Mandarin
- Hanyu Pinyin: Liǔ Zōngyuán
- Wade–Giles: Liu^{3} Tsung^{1}-yüan^{2}
- IPA: [ljòʊ tsʊ́ŋ.ɥɛ̌n]
Wu
- Suzhounese: Leu^{1} Tson^{1}-gnioe^{1}
Yue: Cantonese
- Yale Romanization: Láuh Jōng-yùhn
- Jyutping: Lau^{5} Zung^{1}-jyun^{4}
- IPA: [lɐw˩˧ tsʊŋ.jyn˩]
Southern Min
- Tâi-lô: Liú Tsong-guân

Courtesy name
- Chinese: 子厚
Transcriptions
Standard Mandarin
- Hanyu Pinyin: Zǐhòu
- Wade–Giles: Tzu^{3}hou^{4}

Liu Zongyuan (Chinese: 柳宗元; pinyin: Liǔ Zōngyuán; 773 – 28 November 819), courtesy name Zihou (子厚), was a Chinese philosopher, prose writer, poet, and politician who lived during the Tang dynasty. Liu was born in Chang'an, to a family from present-day Yongji, Shanxi. Along with Han Yu, he was a leader of the Classical Prose Movement in Tang. He is traditionally recognized as one of the "Eight Great Prose Masters of the Tang and Song".

== Biography ==
Liu Zongyuan was born to a family of the "noble clans", which had nurtured social and political leaders for at least fifteen generations. He spent most of his youthful years amid the intellectual and official circles in the capital Chang-an, and received family schooling as early as three years old. By his twenties, he was well versed in ancient classics and histories. He obtained the Jinshi degree in 793 and entered official career in year 798.

Liu Zongyuan's civil service career was initially successful; however, in 805, he fell out of favour with the imperial government because of his association with a failed reformist movement. He was exiled first to Yongzhou, Hunan, and then to Liuzhou, Guangxi, where he eventually became the city governor. A park and temple in Liuzhou is dedicated to his memory. This abrupt turns of life transformed a rising political and intellectual star into a grieving and depressed minor official living in one of the least developed regions of China proper. Nevertheless, his exile allowed his literary career to flourish: he produced poems (including Tang Poetry), fables, reflective travelogues and essays synthesizing elements of Confucianism, Taoism and Buddhism.

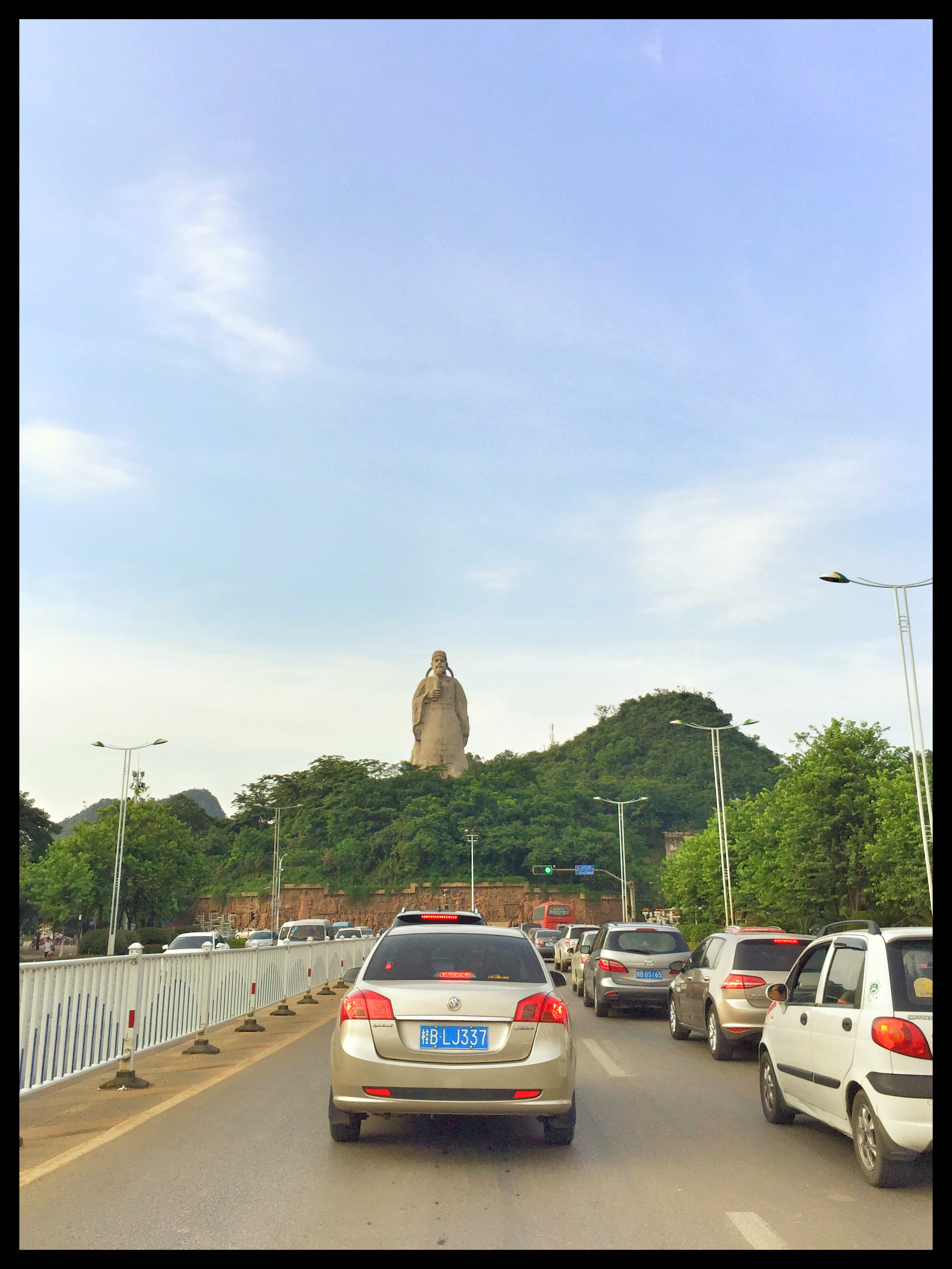
Statue of Liu Zongyuan

He died in 819.

== Works and ideas ==
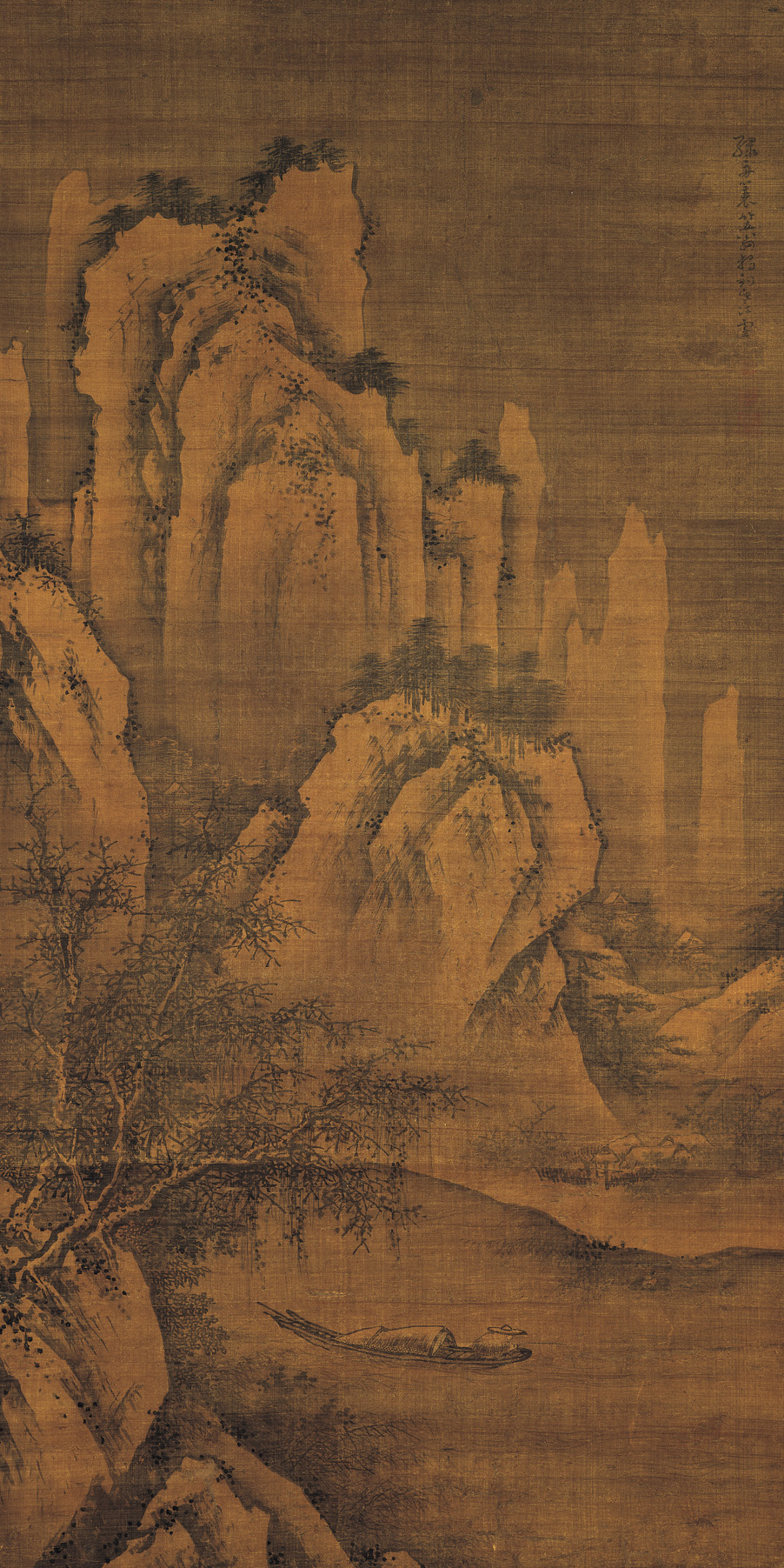
Landscape painting by Zhou Wenjing, the last two lines of Liu Zongyuan's poem "River Snow" written in the upper right corner ("孤舟蓑笠翁，獨釣寒江雪")

As a most distinguished Tang prose writer alongside Han Yu, Liu Zongyuan excelled in biography, travelogue, and fable.

During his exile years, he came to contact with the common people who fell victims to excessive government rules. His biographies thus shed light on these overlooked individuals such as the snake catcher, the tree planter, the carpenter, and the shepherd boy. One of his best-known biographies depicts a snake catcher who risked his life capturing highly venomous snakes in order to avoid paying heavy annual levies. Through these character portraits, Liu Zongyuan argued that government officials had a duty to improve the commoner's lives, as they were indeed the "servant" of the people. Liu further advocated for “the mandate of the people", asserting that the legitimacy of the emperor's authority comes from the support of the people. From a literary point of view, Liu's biographies were rich in story telling and exhibited features of the Chuanqi.

Liu's best-known travel pieces are the Eight Records of Excursions in Yongzhou (永州八記). These nature writings combined vivid descriptions of natural landscape with reflections of his inner emotions. Through themes of aloofness, tranquility, and elegance, he found solace and unity with nature.

Around 180 of his poems are extant, of which five were collected in the anthology Three Hundred Tang Poems. Some of his works celebrate his freedom from office, while others mourn his banishment. One of his most famous poems is "Jiangxue" (江雪), translated into English as "River Snow" or "Winter Snow". The poem has been an inspiration for many works of Chinese painting.

江雪

千山鳥飛絕
萬徑人蹤滅
孤舟蓑笠翁
獨釣寒江雪

River Snow

A thousand mountains, but no sign of birds in flight;
Ten thousand paths, but no trace of human tracks.
In a lone boat, an old man, in a rain hat and a straw raincoat,
Fishing alone, in the cold river snow.

== See also ==
- Classical Chinese poetry
- List of Three Hundred Tang Poems poets
- Tang poetry
- Classical Prose Movement
- Eight Masters of the Tang and Song

== Works cited ==
- Chen, Jo-shui (1992). Liu Tsung-yüan and Intellectual Change in T'ang China, 773–819. Cambridge: Cambridge university press. ISBN 9780521419642.
- Owen, Stephen (2010). "The Cultural Tang(650–1020)". In Owen, Stephen (ed.). The Cambridge history of Chinese literature. Vol. 1. Cambridge: Cambridge university press. ISBN 9780521855587.
- Ueki, Hisayuki; Uno, Naoto; Matsubara, Akira (1999). "Shijin to Shi no Shōgai (Ryū Sōgen)". In Matsuura, Tomohisa (ed.). Kanshi no Jiten 漢詩の事典 (in Japanese). Tokyo: Taishūkan Shoten. pp. 113–115. OCLC 41025662.
- Zhang, Xuezhong, ed. (2019). Tang Song Badajia Wen Guanzhi) 唐宋八大家文观止 [Selected and Annotated works of the Eight Masters of the Tang and Song] (in Chinese). Xi'an: Shanxi renmin jiaoyu chubanshe. ISBN 978-7-5450-6404-9.
- Zhang, Yi (2003). Luo, Zongqiang; Chen, Hong (eds.). Zhongguo gu dai wen xue fa zhan shi 中国古代文学发展史 - 中 (1st ed.). Tianjin: Nan kai da xue chubanshe. ISBN 7-310-01915-6.
